= Grand Anglo-Français Blanc et Noir =

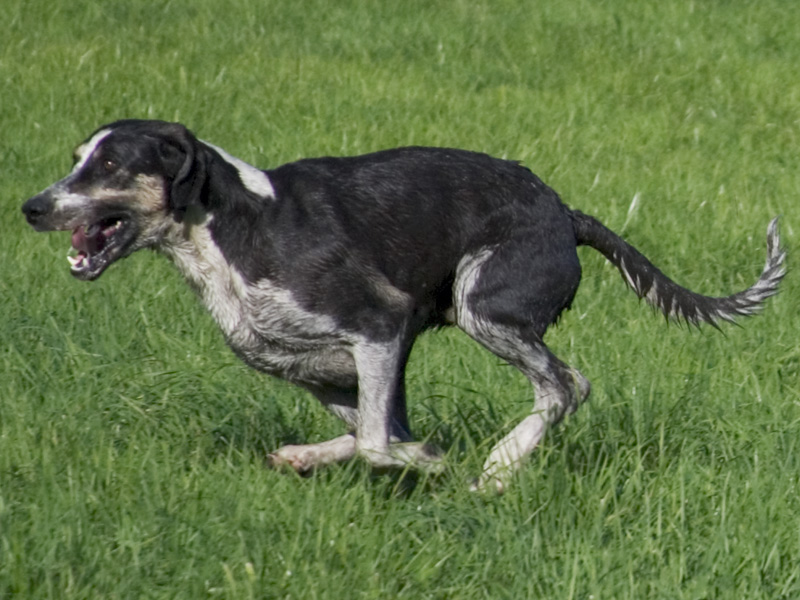
- Grand Anglo-Français Blanc et Noir (323)
- Other names: Grand Anglo-Francais Tricolore
- Origin: France
Kennel club standards
- Société Centrale Canine: standard
- Fédération Cynologique Internationale: standard

The Grand Anglo-Français Blanc et Noir (FCI No.323) translated into English as the Great Anglo-French White and Black Hound, is a breed of dog used in hunting as a scenthound, usually in packs. It is one of the Anglo-French hound breeds which were created by crossing French scenthounds with English (Anglo) Foxhounds.

== Appearance ==
A big, powerful hound in general appearance, with long legs, long drop ears, and a long tail. Their short, double coat is tricolour, black, white and tan. They stand 62–72 cm (24.4-28 ins) at the withers.

Coat colour is white with a black mantle and black markings, including black or blue ticking on the body and tan ticking on the lower legs. Frequently a tan marking is found on the base of the upper thigh, which is called the 'roe buck mark'. Faults are listed as deviations in appearance or structure that have an effect on the health and working ability of the dog, as well as the appearance, and indicate that the dog with such faults should not be bred. Some of the faults listed are aggression or shyness, lack of pigmentation, off-colour, excessive dewlap, and frail limbs.

== History and use ==
Grand Anglo-Français Blanc et Noir is descended from crosses between the old Saintongeois hound and Foxhounds, a type called the Bâtard Anglo-Saintongeois. The names of all the various Anglo-French hound breeds and varieties were all officially described with the term "Anglo-Français" in 1957. They are used as a pack dog to hunt large game such as roe deer, boar, or smaller animals such as fox. Although these are large dogs, "Grand" does not necessarily refer to the size of the dogs. "In most cases it is simply a label for a pack that is used for larger game".

Grand Anglo-Français Blanc et Noir is recognised in its country of origin by the Société Centrale Canine (French Kennel Club) and internationally by the Fédération Cynologique Internationale in Group 6, Scenthounds. In France it is bred and kept primarily as a hunting dog, not as a pet or showdog, and there are "twenty or more" working packs and around 2000 registered dogs as of 2009. The breed has been exported to North America, where it is recognised by the United Kennel Club in its Scenthound Group. It is also registered by minor kennel clubs and Internet dog registry businesses, and is promoted as a rare breed for those seeking a unique pet.

== Health and temperament ==
No unusual health problems or claims of extraordinary health have been documented for this breed. Temperament of individual dogs may vary, but in general dogs bred to be pack hunting dogs do not make good pets. The FCI breed standard describes them as "friendly, close to humans and easy to manage in the kennels".

== See also ==
- List of dog breeds
- Dog terminology
- Anglo-French hounds
