= Grand Anglo-Français Blanc et Orange =

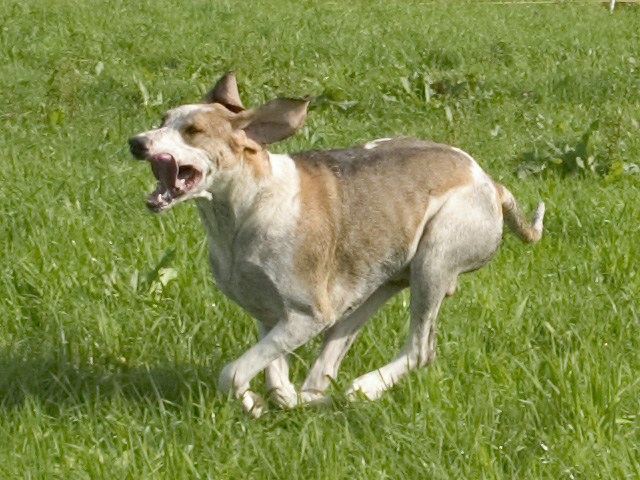
- Grand Anglo-Français Blanc et Orange
- Origin: France
Kennel club standards
- Société Centrale Canine: standard
- Fédération Cynologique Internationale: standard

The Grand Anglo-Français Blanc et Orange translated into English as the Great Anglo-French White and Orange Hound, is a breed of dog used in hunting as a scenthound, usually in packs. It is one of the Anglo-French hound breeds which were created by crossing French scenthounds with English (Anglo) foxhounds.

== Appearance ==
A big, powerful hound that shows the influence of the English Foxhound in general appearance. The breed has long legs, long drop ears, and a long tail. They stand 60–70 cm (24-28 ins) at the withers.

Coat colour is white with white-lemon or white-orange marks, the orange should not appear to be red. Faults are listed as deviations in appearance or structure that have an effect on the health and working ability of the dog, as well as the appearance, and indicate that the dog with such faults should not be bred. Some of the faults listed are aggression or shyness, butterfly nose, off-colour, excessive dewlap, and tail curved or deviated to the side.

== History and use ==
Grand Anglo-Français Blanc et Orange is descended from crosses between the Billy and Foxhounds in the late 1800s. The names of all the various Anglo-French hound breeds and varieties were all officially described with the term "Anglo-Français" in 1957. They are used as a pack dog to hunt large game such as roe deer, boar, or smaller animals such as fox. Although these are large dogs, "Grand" does not necessarily refer to the size of the dogs. "In most cases it is simply a label for a pack that is used for larger game".

Grand Anglo-Français Blanc et Orange is recognised in its country of origin by the Société Centrale Canine (French Kennel Club) and internationally by the Fédération Cynologique Internationale in Group 6, Scenthounds. It is bred and kept primarily as a hunting dog, not as a pet or showdog. The breed has been exported to North America, where it is recognised by the United Kennel Club in its Scenthound Group. It is also registered by minor kennel clubs and internet dog registry businesses, and is promoted as a rare breed for those seeking a unique pet.

== Health and temperament ==
No unusual health problems or claims of extraordinary health have been documented for this breed. Temperament of individual dogs may vary, but in general dogs bred to be pack hunting dogs do not make good pets.

== See also ==
- List of dog breeds
- Dog terminology
- Anglo-French hounds
