= Français =

Français is the French-language word for something of, from, or related to France, the French language and French people.

Français or Française may also refer to:

== Surname ==
- Antoine Français de Nantes (1756-1836), French civil servant, writer and politician
- François Français (1768-1810), French artilleryman and mathematician
- François-Louis Français (1814-1897), French landscape painter
- Jacques Français (luthier) (1923-2004), French luthier
- Jacques Frédéric Français (1775-1833), French captain in the engineering corps, brother of François Français
- Olivier Français (born 1955), Swiss politician

== Places ==
- The Comédie-Française (1680-), a Parisian theatre (also known as Le Français)
- Mount Français, a mountain located in Antarctica

== Arts and entertainment ==
- Français (album), a 2000 album by Michel Sardou
- Française (film), a 2008 French-Moroccan film by Souad El-Bouhati

== Ships ==
- Français (1903), schooner barque, ship of the first French overwintering in Antarctica
- Le Français (tall ship), 1948, three-masted barque, formerly known as the Kaskelot

== Newspapers ==
- Le Français (1868 newspaper), a 19th century French newspaper
- Le Français (1898 newspaper) (1898-1902), a 19th century French-language Martinican newspaper
- La Française (journal), French weekly newspaper (1906–1940) focused on women's suffrage

== Other uses ==
- Français (dog)
  - Chien Français Blanc et Noir, breed of hound originating in France
  - Chien Français Blanc et Orange, breed of hound originating in France
  - Chien Français Tricolore, breed of hound originating in France
- La Française (cycling team), French professional cycling team that existed from 1901 to 1955
- La Française Group, French asset manager created in 1975
- Le Français (pistol) (1913-1969), French pistol

== See also ==
- French (disambiguation)
- Lafrançaise, a commune in the Occitanie region, southern France
