= Poitevin (dog breed) =

Breed of hound

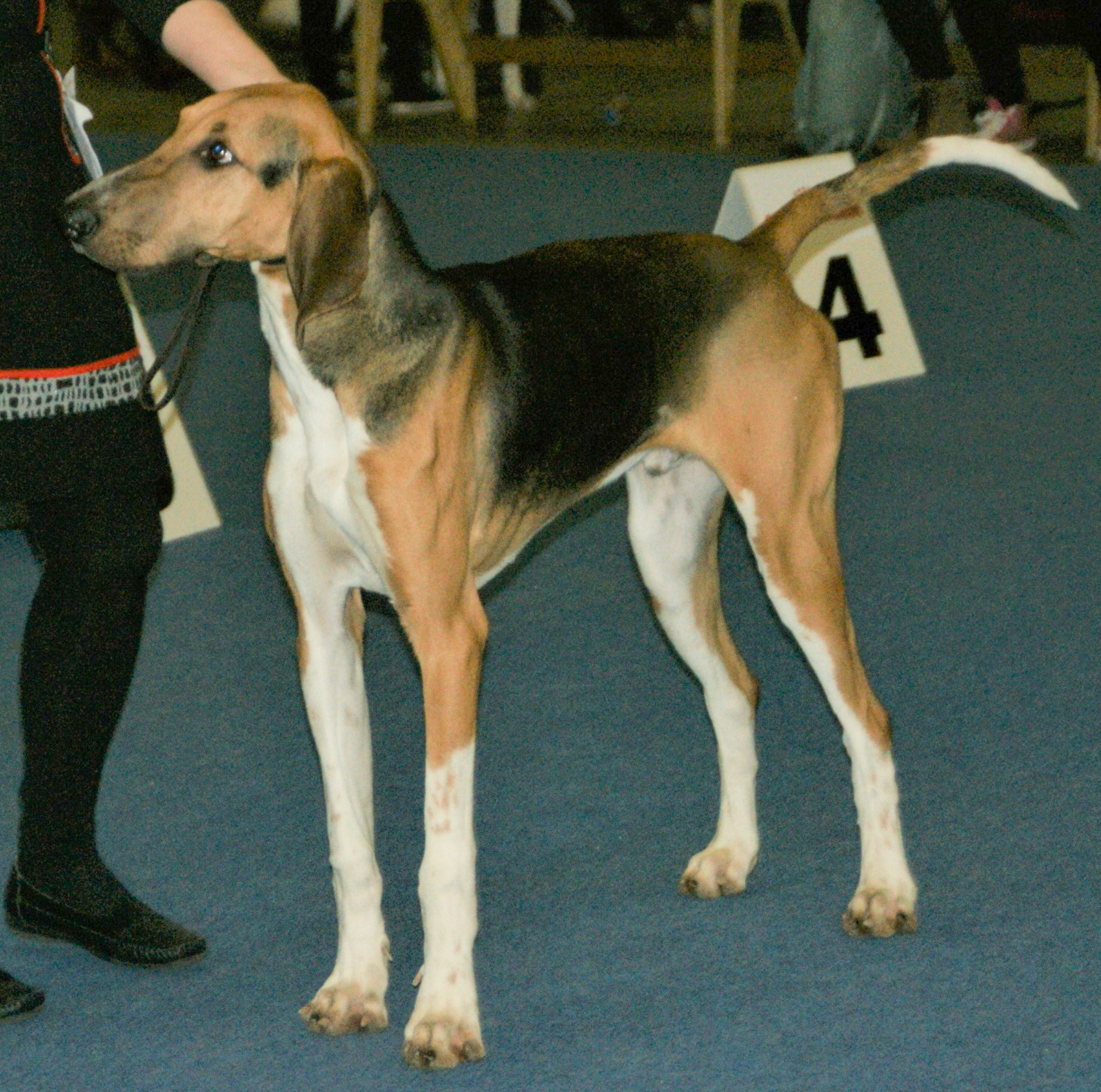
- Other names: Chien du Haut-Poitou
- Common nicknames: Haut-Poitou
- Origin: France
Traits
- Height: 60–72 cm (24–28 in)
- Weight: 20.5–30.5 kg (45–67 lb)
- Coat: Short
- Colour: Tricolour with black saddle
Kennel club standards
- Société Centrale Canine: standard
- Fédération Cynologique Internationale: standard

The Poitevin, also known as the Chien de Haut-Poitou, is a breed of French scenthound from the province of Poitou, this predominantly pack hound was created in the 17th century to hunt wolves.

== Characteristics ==
The Poitevin is a refined, athletic hound with sighthound features. In appearance it looks like a mixture of a foxhound and a greyhound. The Poitevin typically stands 60 to 72 centimetres (24 to 28 in) at the withers and weighs 20.5 to 30.5 kilograms (45 to 67 lb). They have a flat, gently sloping skull; a long, narrow tapering muzzle; a slender, well-muscled neck; long, straight, heavily boned legs and a long tail. The Poitevin's short coat is usually tricolour; all other breeds of tricolour hounds are sometimes described as having Poitevin heritage.

The Poitevin is renowned for its speed, stamina, scenting abilities and melodious voice whilst hunting. Packs have been known to reach speeds of 56 kilometres per hour (35 mph) and to hunt for up to seven hours. In his book La Vénerie, Pierre de Cossé Brissac, 12th Duke of Brissac said of the Poitevin "He is able to chase the quarry more than 7 hours. Because of his speed, the Poitevin's nickname is 'Greyhound among the French hounds'."

While not shy, the Poitevin is known to be more aloof than many other hound breeds and does not adapt well when not kept in a pack environment.

== History ==
Poitevins descend from 12 English Staghounds that were gifted to the Dauphin of France in 1692. Some of the offspring of these hounds were given to François de Larrye, Marquis of Haut-Poitou, who crossed them with local hounds. The offspring of this crossbreeding resulted in strong, athletic tricoloured hounds that the Marquis used to hunt wolf, the first examples of the breed. In addition to the Larrye pack, two other packs of Poitevins were bred, both named after their owners, the Montemboeuf and Céris. These two packs were distinguished from the Larrye hounds in being bicoloured (orange and white), and both were considered inferior to the Larrye hounds.

During the French Revolution, the fortunes of Poitevin suffered greatly. The then-Marquis de Larrye was beheaded in 1793 during the Reign of Terror, and the Larrye pack was dispersed and the breed almost disappeared. After the Revolution, two brothers, Emile and Arthur de la Besage of Montmorillon who lived in Poitou, sought to revive the breed. They collected whatever remaining Poitevins they could, including two from the Larrye pack, and reestablished a pack. In 1842, disaster struck the de la Besage hounds, with an outbreak of rabies in the kennels nearly destroying the pack. The breed was revived by the importation of English Foxhounds, a carefully considered crossbreeding program was implemented, and within three generations the Foxhound influence was barely perceptible within the pack.

The breed suffered greatly during the First and Second World Wars, and at the end of the Second World War further outcrossings to English Foxhounds were necessary to reconstitute the breed.

== Modern use ==
Whilst the Poitevin was originally created to hunt the wolf, several packs are still maintained in France but today are used to hunt boar and deer in the traditions of the 'Grande Vénérie'. The Poitevin was central to the development of the two most popular of France's packhound breeds, the Grand Anglo-Français Tricolore and Chien Français Tricolore, as well as the Anglo-Français de Petite Vénerie.

== See also ==
- List of dog breeds
