= Grand Bleu de Gascogne =

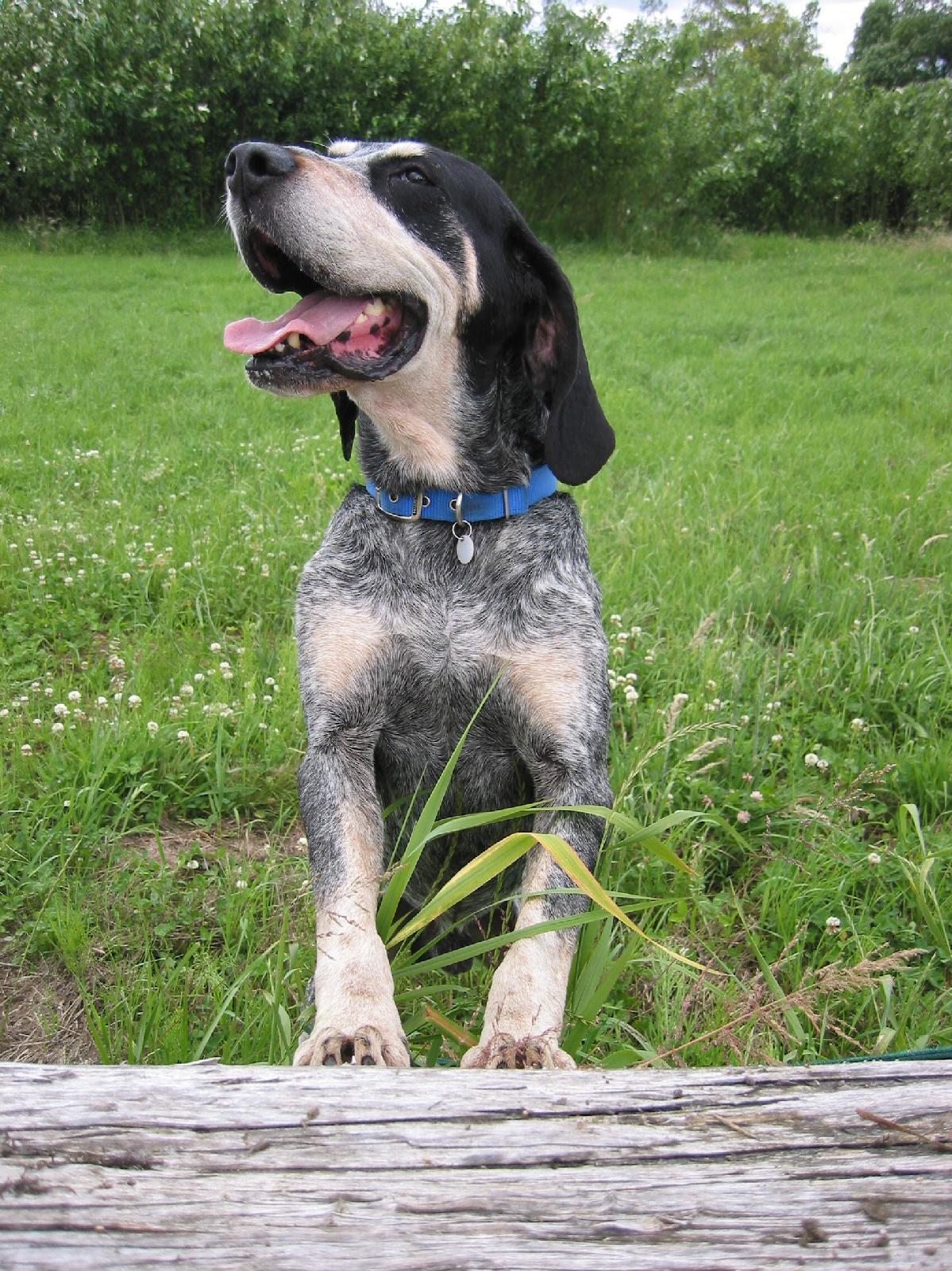
- Grand Bleu de Gascogne
- Origin: France
Traits
Height	Males	65–72 cm (26–28 in)
	Females	62–68 cm (24–27 in)
- Coat: Short and thick
- Colour: Mottled black and white
Kennel club standards
- Société Centrale Canine: standard
- Fédération Cynologique Internationale: standard

The Grand Bleu de Gascogne (French pronunciation: [ɡʁɑ̃ blø də ɡaskɔɲ]) is a breed of hounds of the scenthound type, originating in France and used for hunting in packs. Today's breed is the descendant of a very old type of large hunting dog, and is an important breed in the ancestry of many other hounds.

== Description ==
The Grand Bleu de Gascogne is an imposing large dog, a typical hunting pack hound of the oldest type, with a lean and muscular body, long legs, slightly domed head, long drop ears, and drooping lips. Size is 65 to 72 cm (26 to 28 in) at the withers, females slightly smaller. Dogs of this breed should show an attitude of calm strength and nobility.

The colour of the coat is white mottled with black, giving a slate blue overall appearance. There are black patches on either side of the head, with a white area on top of the head which has in it a small black oval. Tan "eyebrow" marks are over each eye. Faults are deviations in appearance that have an effect on the health and working ability of the dog, as well as an absence of expected features of colour, structure, and size, indicating that a dog with such faults should not be bred. Faults include aggression or fearfulness, anatomical malformation, and lack of type.

Although these are large dogs, weighing 80-120 lbs, "Grand" does not necessarily refer to the size of the dogs; in most cases it is simply a label for a pack that is used for larger game. Today. the breed is used in hunting boar, deer, and other game.

=== Health and temperament ===
No unusual health problems or claims of extraordinary health have been documented for this breed. Temperament of individual dogs may vary.

== History and use ==
The Grand Bleu de Gascogne ancestors were contemporaries with the St Hubert Hound and English Southern Hound, Comte de Foix kept a pack in the 14th century and Henry IV of France kept a pack in the late 16th and early 17th centuries.

The Grand Bleu de Gascogne has a long history in the US, the first dogs were bred there in the 18th century; more Grand Bleus are now in the US than France. General Lafayette presented a pack of seven Grands Bleus to George Washington in 1785, who compared their melodious voices to the bells of Moscow.

The Grand Bleu de Gascogne is noted for its focus on the hunt, as well as a good nose and distinctive, sonorous, deep howl, the breed is "instinctively a pack hound". In the past, it was used to hunt deer, wolves, and boar; in the field it is considered a rather slow and ponderous worker and today is predominantly used to hunt hares.

The Grand Bleu de Gascogne has had a significant influence on the development of several breeds of scent hounds. After the French Revolution, it was used to revitalise the old Saintongeois, creating the Gascon Saintongeois, and the Bluetick Coonhound is considered a direct descendant of the Grand Bleu. The Grand Bleu de Gascogne was used by Sir John Buchanan-Jardine in the development of the Dumfriesshire Hound; in Britain, any native hounds with blue marbled coats are still referred to as 'Frenchies' after this breed.

== See also ==
- List of dog breeds
- Anglo French and French Hounds
- Dog terminology
- Petit Bleu de Gascogne
- Griffon Bleu de Gascogne
- Basset Bleu de Gascogne
