= Anglo-Français de Petite Vénerie =

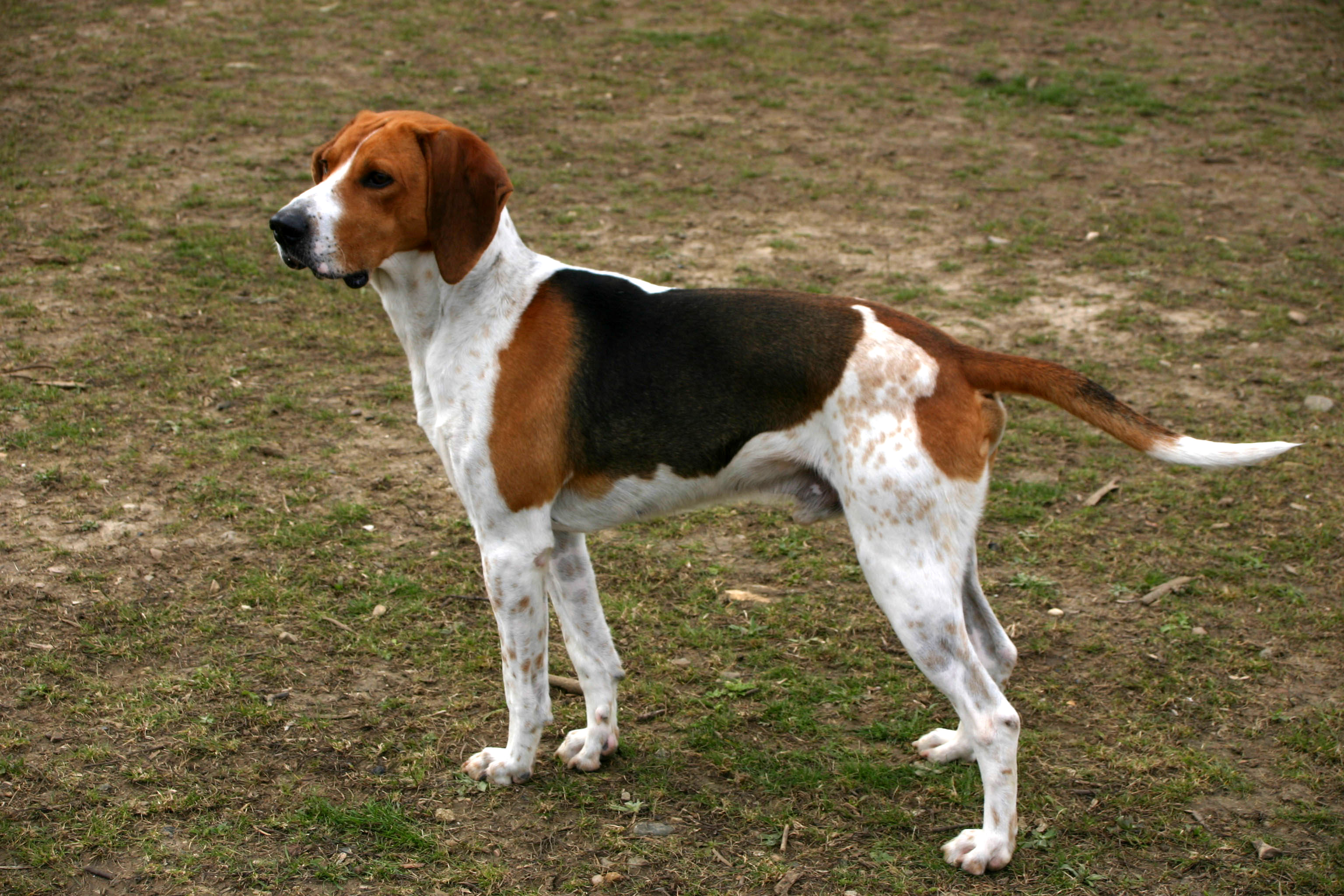
- An Anglo-Français de Petite Vénerie
- Origin: France
Traits
- Height: 48–56 cm (19–22 in)
- Coat: short, dense and smooth
- Colour: white, black and bright tan; white, black and pale tan; white and orange.
Kennel club standards
- Société Centrale Canine: standard
- Fédération Cynologique Internationale: standard

The Anglo-Français de Petite Vénerie is a medium-sized breed of dog used in hunting as a scenthound, usually in packs. It is one of the Anglo-French hound breeds which were created by crossing French scenthounds with English foxhounds. The name Petite Vénerie does not mean that dogs of the breed are petite or small, but rather that it is used to hunt small game.

== History and use ==
The Anglo-Français de Petite Vénerie was created from crosses of older Anglo-French hounds with Harrier (Beagle) and Poitevin, and also with the Petit Gascon-Saintongeois and the Petit bleu de Gascogne. The French hunting hounds have a very long history, with named local types being recorded in the 16th century. Unlike the larger hounds, the Anglo-Français de Petite Vénerie was not intended for hunting large game. It was primarily used in the Chasse-à-Tir, where the pack (or sometimes an individual dog) circles the game animal and chases it back towards the waiting hunter. Before 1978 the breed was called the Petit Anglo-Français, as it is the smallest of the Anglo-French hounds.

The breed is recognised in its country of origin by the Société Centrale Canine (French Kennel Club) and internationally in 1983 by the Fédération Cynologique Internationale in Group 6, Scenthounds. In France it is bred and kept primarily as a hunting dog, not as a pet or showdog. The breed has been exported to North America, where it is recognised by the United Kennel Club in its Scenthound Group.

== Health and temperament ==
Because these are active hunting dogs that are normally kept in packs in rural areas, they may not be suitable for city or family living. There are no documented breed-specific health problems, but like all drop-eared breeds, the area under the ear is prone to developing infections.

== See also ==
- List of dog breeds
- Dog terminology
- Hunting dog
- Anglo-French hounds
