= Griffon Bleu de Gascogne =

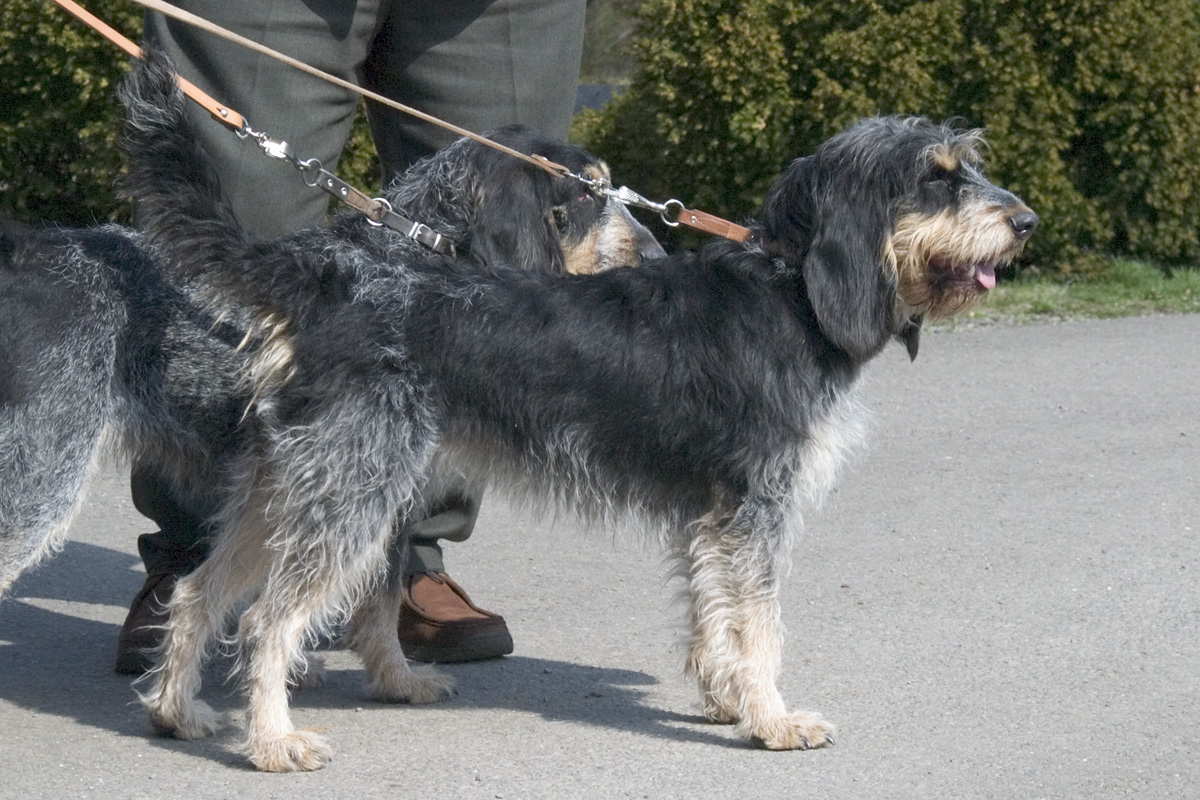
- Griffon Bleu de Gascogne
- Origin: France
Kennel club standards
- Société Centrale Canine: standard
- Fédération Cynologique Internationale: standard

The Griffon Bleu de Gascogne is a breed of dog of the scenthound type, originating in France, and is a versatile hunting dog, used on small and large game, in packs or individually. The Griffon Bleu de Gascogne has a speckled, rough coat.

== Appearance ==
The Griffon Bleu de Gascogne is a medium-large dog, 48 to 57 cm (18.9-22.4 ins) at the withers, with a distinctive rough (shaggy) blue speckled coat, drop ears that are not as long as those on other hounds, and a tail carried up and in a slight curve.

The colour of the Griffon Bleu de Gascogne's coat is the same as the Grand Bleu de Gascogne, white mottled with black, giving a slate blue overall appearance. There are black patches on either side of the head, with a white area on top of the head which has in it a small black oval. Tan "eyebrow" marks are over each eye give a 'quatreoeuillé' (four-eyed) effect, and tan is found on the cheeks, inside the ears, on the legs, and under the tail. Texture of the coat should be hard and rough, a little shorter on the head than on the body. Faults are deviations in appearance or temperament that have an effect on the health and working ability of the dog, as well as an absence of expected features of colour, structure, and size, indicating that a dog with such faults should not be bred. Faults include timidity, soft topline, snipey muzzle, cowhocked, splayed feet, and a wooly coat.

== History ==
The Griffon Bleu de Gascogne is descended from crosses between the Bleu de Gascogne and the Griffon Nivernais, and possibly the Grand Griffon Vendéen as well. The breed declined for many years, but is now experiencing a revival.

The breed has a good nose and a good voice. It is a good and very alert hunting dog for various kinds of hunting, not just as a pack hound for large game. Examples of the Griffon Bleu de Gascogne have been exported to other countries, where they are promoted as a rare breed for those seeking a unique pet.

== Health and temperament ==
No unusual health problems or claims of extraordinary health have been documented for this breed. The breed's temperament is described in the breed standard as being highly excitable, but affectionate. Temperament of individual dogs may vary.

== See also ==
- List of dog breeds
- Anglo-French and French Hounds
- Dog terminology
- Grand Bleu de Gascogne
- Petit Bleu de Gascogne
- Basset Bleu de Gascogne
