= Chien Français Blanc et Orange =

French: Chien Français Blanc et Orange
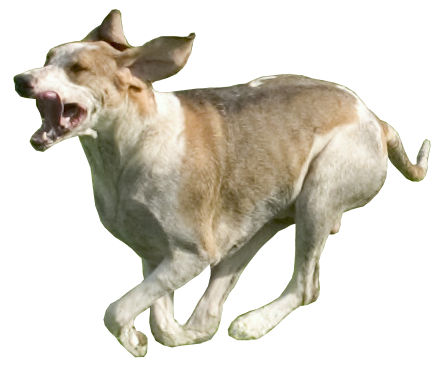
- Grand Anglo-Français Blanc Et Orange
- Origin: France
Kennel club standards
- Société Centrale Canine: standard
- Fédération Cynologique Internationale: standard

The Chien Français Blanc et Orange is a breed of dog of the scenthound type, originating in France. The breed is used for hunting in packs and descends from the old Hound of Saintonge type of large hunting dog.

== Appearance ==
The breed is a typical large French hunting pack hound, with a lean and muscular body, long legs, slightly domed head, long drop ears, and slightly square flews. Size is 62 to a maximum of 70 cm (23.6 to 27.6 ins) at the withers, making it slightly smaller than the Chien Français Blanc et Noir.

The colour of the coat is white and orange, but the orange should never appear to be a red colour. The dog's skin is the same colour as the fur, orange under the orange fur and white under the white fur. Faults are listed as physical or behavioural abnormalities, and a dog with such faults should not be bred.

The breed is noted for its perseverance on the hunt as well as a good nose and voice. Unusual for pack dogs, it is friendly and easy for humans to manage.

== Use ==
The Chien Français Blanc et Orange are pack-hunting dogs, which means that groups of dogs are hunted together, always directed by a human, not running about hunting by themselves.

== See also ==
- List of dog breeds
- Anglo-French Hounds
- Dog terminology
