= Artois Hound =

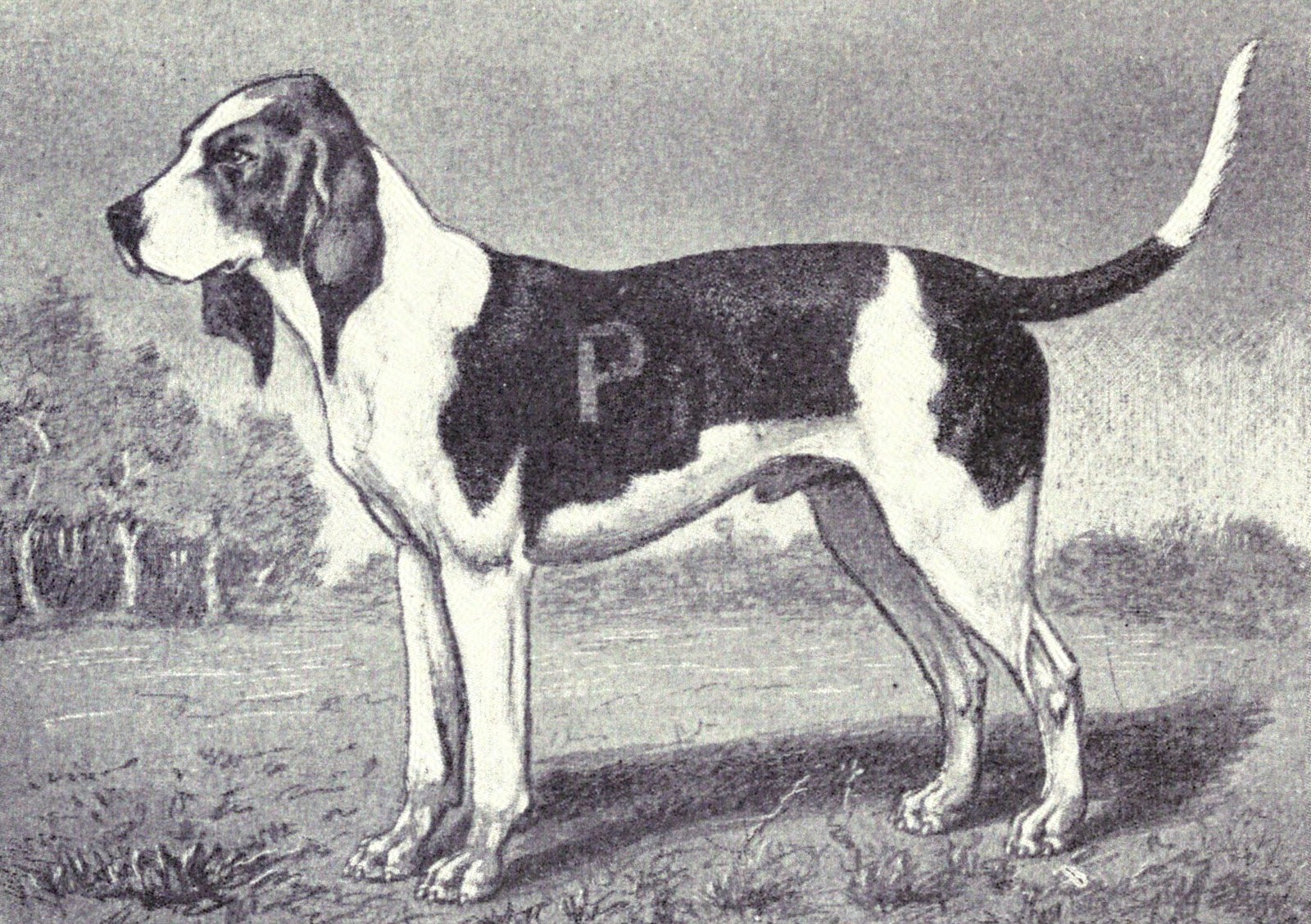
- Artois Hound
- Other names: Chien d'Artois; Picard; Briquet
- Origin: France
Traits
- Height: 53–58 cm (21–23 in)
- Weight: 28–30 kg (62–66 lb)
Kennel club standards
- Société Centrale Canine: standard
- Fédération Cynologique Internationale: standard

The Artois Hound or Chien D'Artois is a medium-sized breed of dog. A scent hound, the Artois was bred in northern France as a pack hunter. It is a rare breed today, but was popular in France before the 20th century. The breed was heavily crossbred and had to be reconstructed in the 1970s to more closely resemble the historical breed.

== Characteristics ==
The Artois is a medium-sized, muscular dog, about 53 to 58 centimetres (21 to 23 in) high at the withers and 28 to 30 kilograms (62 to 66 lb). It has a square-shaped muzzle and long, low-hanging ears. Its tail is long and carried upwards in a sickle shape. The coat is short and typically dark fawn tricolor, "similar to a hare or badger."

A scent hound, the Artois is a small pack hunter with a strong pack instinct. It has been used to hunt small game, as well as deer and wild boar. Like many hounds, it has a loud musical bark.

== History ==
The Artois Hound are from Artois, in northern France. A similarly named dog was referenced as early as 1609, with Prince Alexandre de Gray mentioning "a pack of little d'Artois dogs" in a letter.

Engraving of the original D'Artois Hound.

During the 19th century, the Artois Hound was increasingly crossbred with British breeds. Le Couteulx de Canteleu, in the 1890 Manuel de Vénerie Française, writes that it was difficult to find a purebred Artois, but the breed remained one of the best breeds for hare hunting. In the 1880s, Ernest Levair in Picardy had attempted the re-establishment of the old Artois type. Another prominent breeder contemporary to Levair, Mallard also bred Artois, but his dogs were much less similar to the historical descriptions of the breed. Despite these efforts, however, WWII was very damaging for the breed and after the Second World War, the Artois was all but extinct.

In the 1970s, a few aficionados, in particular Audrechy, decided to reconstitute the breed from a few remaining specimens, including those of the Prince de Conde. Thanks to these efforts, the modern-day Artois closely resembles the original.

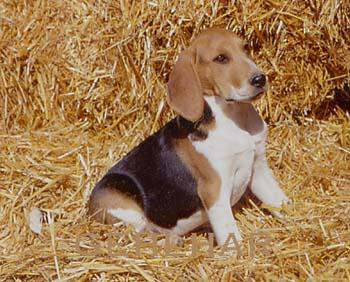
Artois puppy, three months old

The modern Artois Hound is recognized by the FCI and the United Kennel Club.

== See also ==
- List of dog breeds
- Beagle
- Anglo-Français de Petite Vénerie
