= Petit Griffon de Gascogne =

Petit Griffon De Gascogne may refer to:

- Basset Bleu de Gascogne, a small hound but not a Griffon hound
- Griffon Bleu de Gascogne, a coarse-haired, medium-sized hound
- Petit bleu de Gascogne, a medium-large hound for hunting small game, but not a Griffon hound
