= Billy (dog breed) =

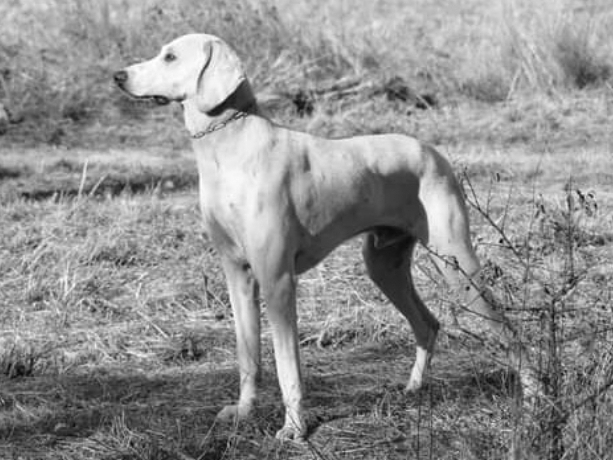
- Origin: France
Traits
| Height | Males | 60–70 cm (24–28 in) |
| | Females | 58–62 cm (23–24 in) |
- Coat: short, harsh to the touch
- Colour: white or off-white; may have orange or lemon patches or mantle
Kennel club standards
- Société Centrale Canine: standard
- Fédération Cynologique Internationale: standard

The Billy is a French breed of large scent hound. It originates in Poitou, in western France.

== History ==
The Billy was bred by Monsieur Gaston Hublot de Rivault Taco in the 19th century, and was named after his home, Château de Billy, in Poitou. The breed was created by combining the three original strains of the Poitevin: the Montemboeuf, Ceris and Larrye. While the extant Poitevin more-closely resembles the original, tricoloured Larrye line, de Rivault was more drawn to the paler colours associated with the Montemboeuf and Ceris lines, and colouration was a key factor when selecting breeding stock. The pack was dispersed in 1927, with the breed almost facing extinction, and only two hounds survived World War II; however, de Rivault's son, Anthony, set-about reviving the breed by judicious use of the Poitevin, the Porcelaine, and the Harrier.

The Billy became one of the foundational breeds used in the development of the Grand Anglo-Français Blanc et Orange in the late nineteenth century.

It remains a rare breed, though several packs remain; they are used to hunt roe deer and wild boar.

== Characteristics ==
The Billy may be pure white, off-white or grey, with some displaying orange or lemon-yellow spots on the head and body. The coat is short, smooth, and somewhat harsh to the touch. Weight is between 72 and 104 lbs (max. 47 kg), and height is 60–70 cm (approx. 2 ft 3 in) at the shoulder, for males, and 58–62 cm (approx. 2 ft), for females.

The Fédération Cynologique Internationale (FCI) standard suggests that the dog should gallop easily in its movement. The standard for the breed was established in 1885.
