= Grand Anglo-Français Tricolore =

Grand Anglo-Francais Tricolore
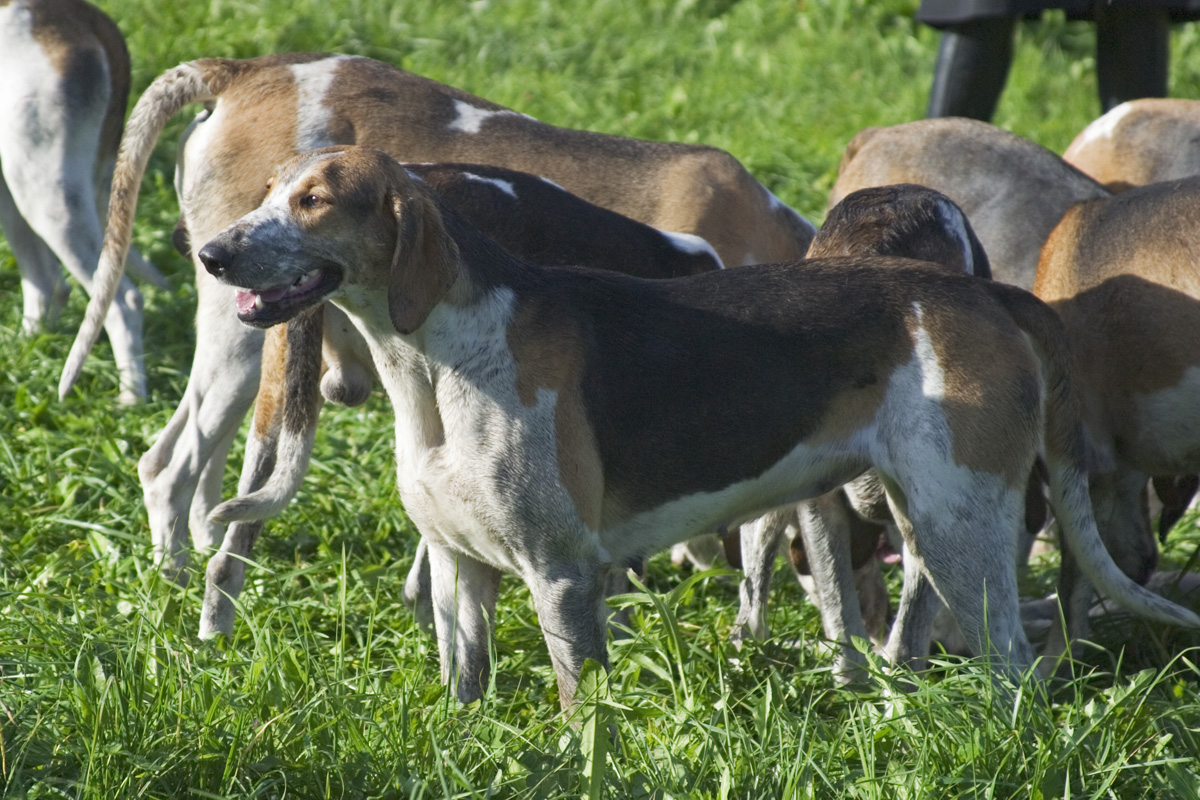
- Other names: Grand Anglo-Francais Tricolore Hound
- Origin: France
Traits
- Height: 60–70 cm (24–28 in)
- Coat: Short
- Colour: Tricolour
Kennel club standards
- Société Centrale Canine: standard
- Fédération Cynologique Internationale: standard

The Grand Anglo-Francais Tricolore is a breed of dog used in hunting as a scenthound, usually in packs. It is one of the Anglo-French hound breeds which were created by crossing French scenthounds with English (Anglo) Foxhounds.

== Appearance ==
A typical hound in general appearance, with long legs, long drop ears, and a long tail. Their short, double coat is tricolour, black, white and tan. They stand 60–72 cm (24–28 in) at the withers and weigh between 34.5-35.5 kg (76-78 lbs).

== History and use ==
The Grand Anglo-Francais Tricolore is descended from crosses between tricoloured Poitevins and Foxhounds. This combination has strongly influenced this breed in many ways. These animals are strong and compact in stature like the foxhound with a black blanketed tri-colour coat. They were used as a pack dog to hunt large game such as red deer, wild boar and roe deer or smaller animals such as fox. "Grand" does not necessarily refer to size, "in most cases it is simply a label for a pack that is used for larger game".

The breed is recognised in its country of origin by the Société Centrale Canine (French Kennel Club) and internationally in 1983 by the Fédération Cynologique Internationale in Group 6, Scenthounds. In France it is bred and kept primarily as a hunting dog, not as a pet or showdog. The breed has been exported to North America, where it is recognised by the United Kennel Club in its Scenthound Group. It is also registered by numerous minor registries and internet dog registry businesses, and is promoted as a rare breed for those seeking a unique pet.

== Health and temperament ==
This large Anglo-French hound requires an immense amount of exercise. They are normally kept in large packs in rural areas and may not adapt well to city or family life, although they are said to be good natured. Letting them off the leash may be hazardous as the hunting instinct is very high.

== Tricolour ==
A tricolour coat is a pattern of some shade of black or brown, some shade of red often called tan, and some white. Eumelanin and phaeomelanin pigmentation occurs on the same dog; "the back is black from eumelanin pigment being made and the belly is tan or red from phaeomelanin pigment being made".

== See also ==
- Anglo-French hounds
- Dog terminology
