= Chien Français Blanc et Noir =

Français Blanc et Noir
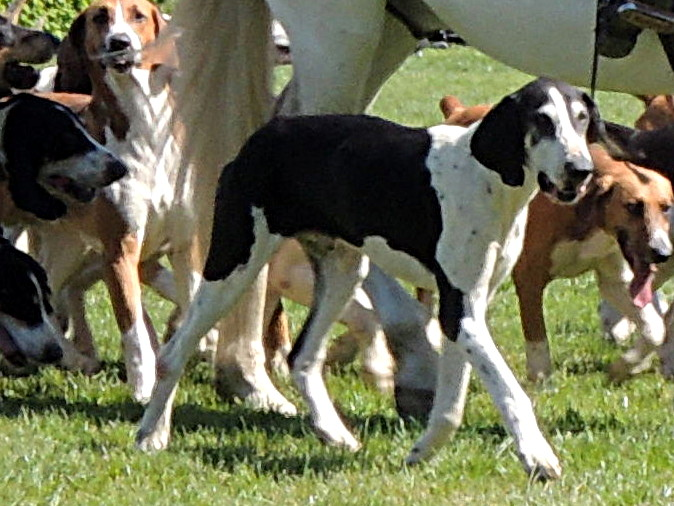
- Origin: France
Kennel club standards
- Société Centrale Canine: standard
- Fédération Cynologique Internationale: standard

The Chien Français Blanc et Noir (translated into English as the French White and Black dog) is a breed of dog of the scenthound type, originating in France. The breed is used for hunting in packs and descends from the old Hound of Saintonge type of large hunting dog.

== Appearance ==
The breed is a typical hunting pack hound, with a lean and muscular body, long legs, slightly domed head, long drop ears, and slightly square flews that just overlap the lower lip. Size is 65 to 72 cm (26 to 28 in) at the withers, females slightly smaller.

The colour of the coat is white and black, with a black mantle, sometimes speckled or ticked with black or blue. Pale tan dots are above each eye as well as tan on the cheeks, below the eyes and ears, and below the tail. Sometimes a tan marking is found on the base of the upper thigh, which is called the 'roe buck mark'. Faults are listed as deviations in appearance that have an effect on the health and working ability of the dog, as well as indication of crossing with Foxhounds or being off-colour, indicating that a dog with such faults should not be bred.

The breed is noted for its perseverance on the hunt as well as a good nose and voice. Unusual for pack hounds, it is friendly and easy for humans to manage.

== History ==
The breed's ancestry was in the old Hound of Saintonge, which almost disappeared during the French Revolution, through the Gascon Saintongeois breed created by Count Joseph de Carayon-Latour in the mid-19th century. The Gascon Saintongeois hounds were crossbred with the Poitevin in the late 19th century to produce the Chien Français Blanc et Noir. The dogs were officially recognised as a breed in 1957. In 2009, there were approximately 2000 of the breed registered through the Fédération Cynologique Internationale.

The Chien Français Blanc et Noir are pack hunting hounds, which means that groups hunt together in packs, always directed by a human, not running about hunting by themselves. The Chien Français Blanc et Noir packs are especially valued in the hunting of red deer or roe deer. Their attractiveness and deep howl has made them an increasingly popular pet in the United States.

== See also ==
- List of dog breeds
- Anglo-French Hounds
- Dog terminology
