= Petit Bleu de Gascogne =

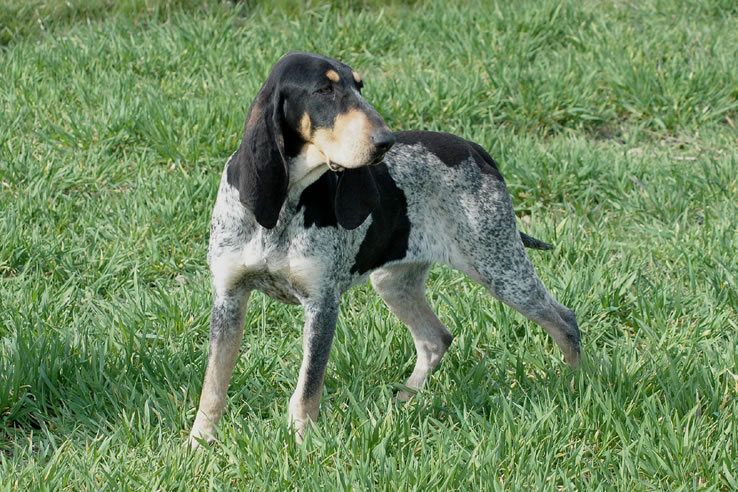
- Petit Bleu de Gascogne (31)
- Origin: France
Traits
Height	Males	52–58 cm (20–23 in)
	Females	50–56 cm (20–22 in)
- Coat: Short and thick
- Colour: Mottled black and white
Kennel club standards
- Société Centrale Canine: standard
- Fédération Cynologique Internationale: standard

The Petit Bleu de Gascogne is a breed of dog of the scenthound type, originating in France and used for hunting in packs. Today's breed is the descendant of a large hunting dog. The Petit Bleu de Gascogne is not a small (petite) dog, the name comes from its use on small game.

== Appearance ==
The Petit Bleu de Gascogne is directly descended from the Grand Bleu de Gascogne, a hound of ancient type. Smaller examples of the Grand Bleu de Gascogne were selected for hunting small game such as hare (the Grand Bleu de Gascogne was developed to hunt wolves, bears and boars) and eventually became a separate breed. It is a medium-large size dog, not a small dog, standing 52 to 58 cm (20 to 23 in) at the withers, with females slightly smaller.

The colour of the coat is the same as the Grand Bleu de Gascogne, white mottled with black, giving a slate blue overall appearance. There are black patches on either side of the head, with a white area on top of the head which has in it a small black oval. Tan "eyebrow" marks are over each eye give a 'quatreoeuillé' (four-eyed) effect. Faults are deviations in appearance that have an effect on the health and working ability of the dog, as well as an absence of expected features of colour, structure, and size, indicating that a dog with such faults should not be bred. Faults include aggression or fearfulness, anatomical malformation, and lack of type.

The Petite Bleu de Gascogne is noted for working well in a pack and being calm and easy to handle.

== History ==
The Grand Bleu de Gascogne's ancestors were contemporary with the St. Hubert Hounds, dogs that were hunted in packs by the 14th century Comte de Foix on wolves, bears and boars. The slightly smaller Petit Bleu de Gascogne used on small game may have existed along with the boar hunting dog for centuries.

"Petite" does not necessarily refer to the size of the dogs, but refers to the French expression for hounds used for smaller game.

== Health and temperament ==
No unusual health problems or claims of extraordinary health have been documented for this breed. Temperament of individual dogs may vary, but in general dogs bred to be pack hunting dogs do not make good pets.

== See also ==
- List of dog breeds
- Anglo-French and French Hounds
- Dog terminology
- Grand Bleu de Gascogne
- Griffon Bleu de Gascogne
- Basset Bleu de Gascogne
