= Chien Français Tricolore =

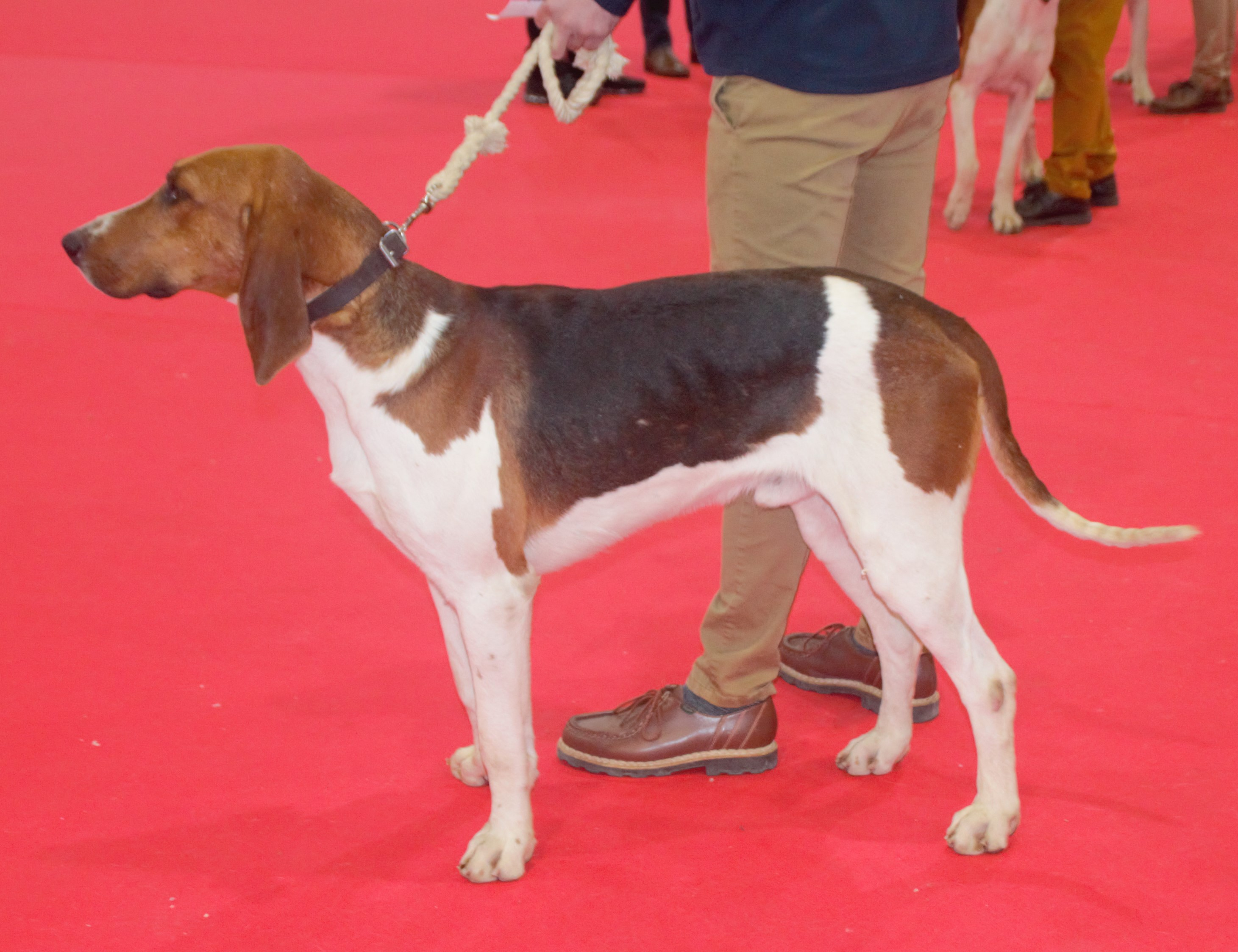
- Origin: France
Kennel club standards
- Société Centrale Canine: standard
- Fédération Cynologique Internationale: standard

The Chien Français Tricolore translated into English as the French Tricolour Hound, is a breed of dog of the scenthound type, originating in France. The breed is used for hunting in packs.

== Appearance ==
The breed is a typical large French hunting pack hound, with a lean and muscular body, long legs, elongated head with a noticeable occipital protuberance, long drop ears, and slightly square flews. Their size is 62 to 72 centimetres (24 to 28 in) at the withers; females are slightly smaller.

The coat is tricolour, with a wide black mantle, and tan parts are of a bright colour. A grizzled colour called "louvard" ("wolf-like") is also seen in the breed. Faults are listed as physical or behavioural abnormalities, and a dog with such faults should not be bred. Faults include fat feet, aggression, or any trace of crossing with English hounds.

== Use ==
The Chien Français Tricolore are pack hunting dogs, which means that groups of dogs are hunted together, always directed by a human, not running about hunting by themselves. Dogs bred to be pack hunting dogs do not usually make good pets.

== See also ==
- List of dog breeds
- Anglo-French Hounds
- Dog terminology
