= Jo Longhurst =

UK-based artist and photographer

Jo Longhurst is a UK-based artist and photographer. She is the winner of the Canadian 2012 Grange Prize. She was the Art Gallery of Ontario's Artist-in-residence from November to December 2012.

== Early life and education ==
Longhurst was born in Essex, UK. She earned a doctorate at the Royal College of Art.

== Career ==
Longhurst is known for her photographs of gymnasts, which she displays in an exhibit entitled Other Spaces, and also her exhibit of photographs of Show dogs, which she titles The Refusal. Her work has been exhibited in the UK and in Europe.
