= Show Dogs (disambiguation) =

Show dogs may refer to:

- show dog
- Show Dogs, a 2018 film
- Show Dog-Universal Music
