= Dumfriesshire hound =

Dumfriesshire Black and Tan Foxhound
- Origin: United Kingdom
- Breed status: Extinct

Dumfriesshire Black and Tan Foxhounds were a pack of foxhounds kennelled at Glenholm Kennels, Kettleholm, near Lockerbie until they were disbanded in 2001. They were established by Sir John Buchanan Jardine, author of Hounds of the World (1937), after the First World War. The hounds are believed to have originally been created by crossing Bloodhound/Grand Bleu de Gascogne/English Foxhound. They were larger than standard foxhounds and were black and tan. There is a pack descended from them in France, known as Equipage de la Roirie, and they are used also by the Equipage Pique Avant Nivernais as staghounds, along with the Français Blanc et Noir hound.

These large hounds were also crossed with the Dumfriesshire otterhounds during the foundation of the Otterhound pack. Since the Second World War, the Dumfriesshire hound has been used to improve speed and agility in several clean boot hunting bloodhound packs; as one example, Eric Furness introduced Dumfriesshire hound blood into his Peak bloodhounds.

Dumfriesshire hounds starred as bloodhounds in The Thirty Nine Steps with Robert Powell, which was partly filmed in the Kettleholm area.
