= Anglo-Français and Français (hound) =

Type of dog

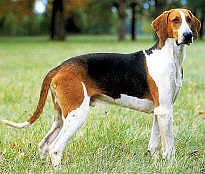
Anglo-Français de petite vénerie

Anglo-Français and Français hounds are a general dog type of hunting dog that include ancient French hounds and breeds created by mixing the French dogs with English (Anglo) Foxhounds. There are seven dog breeds that are described as Anglo-Français and Français hounds.

== Breeds ==
- Chien Français Blanc et Noir, the original breed that evolved over centuries and was influenced in the 19th century by crosses between the Poitevin and the Grand Gascon Saintongeois.
- Chien Français Blanc et Orange
- Chien Français Tricolore, the classic hound that follows a hunter on horseback. It is similar in appearance to the Poitevin.
- Grand Anglo-Français Blanc et Noir, originally from the 19th century Bâtard Anglo-Saintongeois dog type, a cross between the Saintongeois and the English Foxhound
- Grand Anglo-Français Blanc et Orange, originally from crosses between the Billy and the English Foxhound, showing a great deal of the foxhound type in appearance
- Grand Anglo-Français Tricolore, the breed most influenced by the English Foxhound
- Anglo-Français de Petite Vénerie, created by crossing the Harrier with the Poitevin, the Porcelaine, the Petit Gascon Saintongeois and the Petit Bleu de Gascogne. De Petite Vénerie refers to dogs used on smaller game, such as rabbits and hares, not to the size of the dog.

These names replaced older names in 1957, when it was decided to append "Anglo-Français" to the names of all the French hounds that had been crossed with English Foxhounds. "Grand" (French for "large") does not mean that the dogs are especially large, but rather that they hunted in large packs. Hunting with the hounds was originally done in two styles, Chasse-à-Courre, in which the pack chases and kills the game animal, and Chasse-à-Tir, where the pack (or sometimes an individual dog) circles the game animal and chases it back towards the waiting hunter.

Individual hunting hounds are not well suited to be pets, as they need a great deal of space, exercise, and experienced handling. Most breeds are usually kept in packs of 20 to 100 dogs. The French and Anglo-French hounds are bred as hunting dogs, not as pets or show dogs, and are registered through the Société Centrale Canine (the French Kennel Club) and the Fédération Cynologique Internationale (FCI). Some dogs of these breeds have been exported to North America and are recognised by the United Kennel Club (US), which has specialized in hunting hounds for many years. Other dogs of these breeds, especially the Anglo-Français de Petite Vénerie, are being bred in North America for the rare breed pet market, and are registered through various minor registries and internet dog registry businesses. An additional breed name, apparently invented in North America, the Anglo-Français de Moyenne Vénerie, is sometimes seen advertised.

== See also ==
- Dog type
- Hound
- Hunting dog
- Scenthound
