= La Française Group =

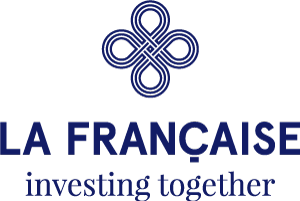
- Industry: Investment management
- Founded: 1975; 51 years ago
- Headquarters: Paris, France
- AUM: USD 187 billion (Q2 2025)
- Number of employees: 1 000
- Website: La Française

La Française Group is a global asset manager headquartered in Paris. It was created in 1975. The firm acquired Cushman & Wakefield Investors in 2014. In 2016, La Française Group was 168th out in IPE's annual asset management study of 400 firms. The main shareholder, Crédit Mutuel Nord Europe, is a leading banking and insurance group present in Northern France and Belgium. In 2018, the La Française Group was ranked 168th management company in the world in terms of assets under

La Française Group has developed an investment platform, ranging from traditional asset classes all the way to alternatives area. La Française Global Real Estate Group, in February 2019 officially announced its long-term partnership with Canadian Pension Plan Investment Board in the development of Grand Paris.
