= Porcelaine =

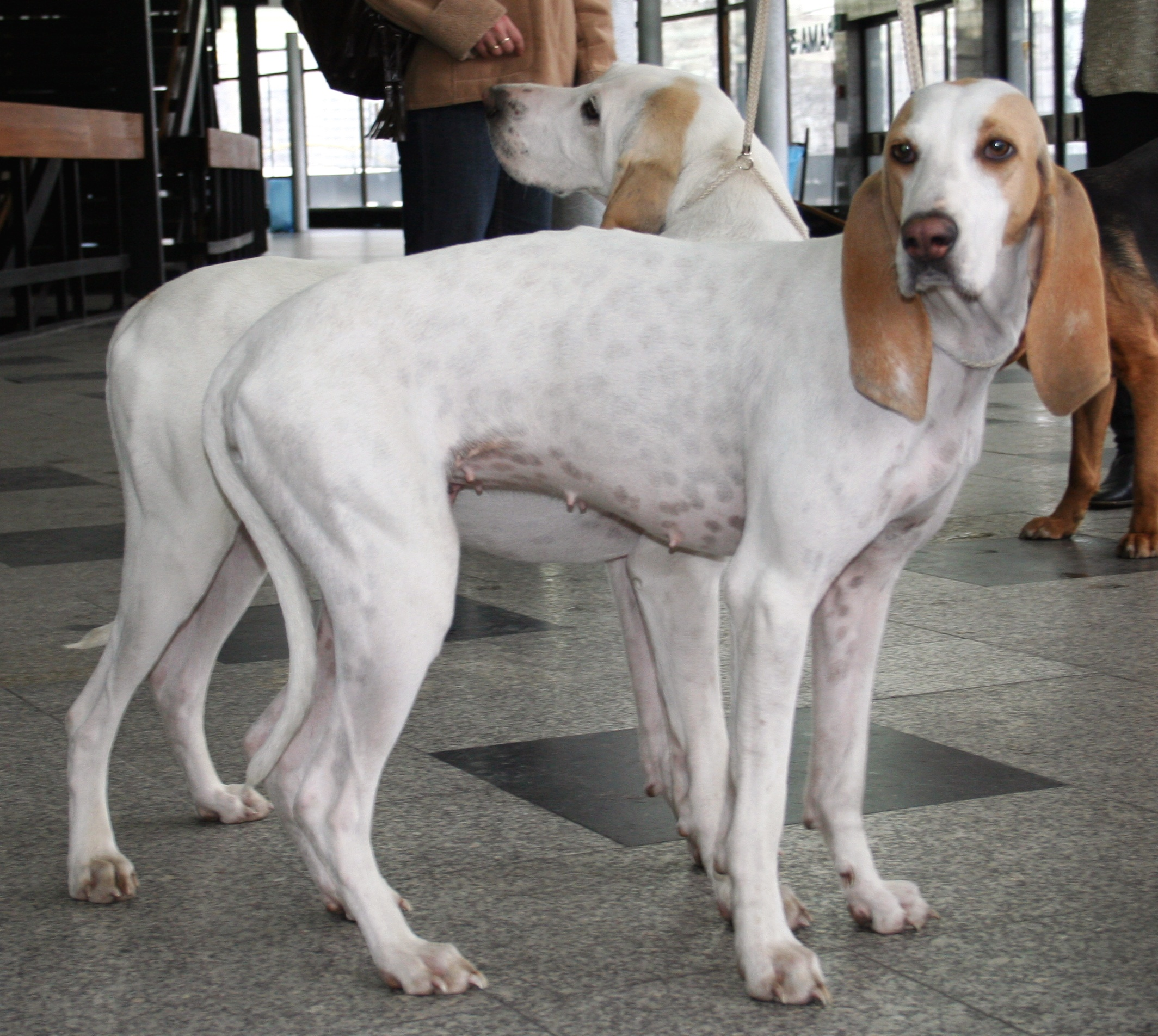
- Other names: Briquet Franc-Comtois; Chien de Franche-Comté; Chien de Porcelaine
- Origin: France
Traits
Height	Males	55–58 cm (22–23 in)
	Females	53–56 cm (21–22 in)
Kennel club standards
- Société Centrale Canine: standard
- Fédération Cynologique Internationale: standard

The Porcelaine [pɔʁsəlɛn] is a French breed of dog of scent hound type. It was formerly also known as the Briquet Franc-Comtois after the historical Franche-Comté region of Burgundy, in eastern France.

== History ==
The Porcelaine is thought to be a descendant of the English Harrier, some of the smaller Laufhounds of Switzerland, and the now-extinct Montaimboeuf. There have been records of the breed in France since 1845 and in Switzerland since 1880. The breed actually disappeared after the French Revolution (1789–99) but has been reconstructed.

== Characteristics ==
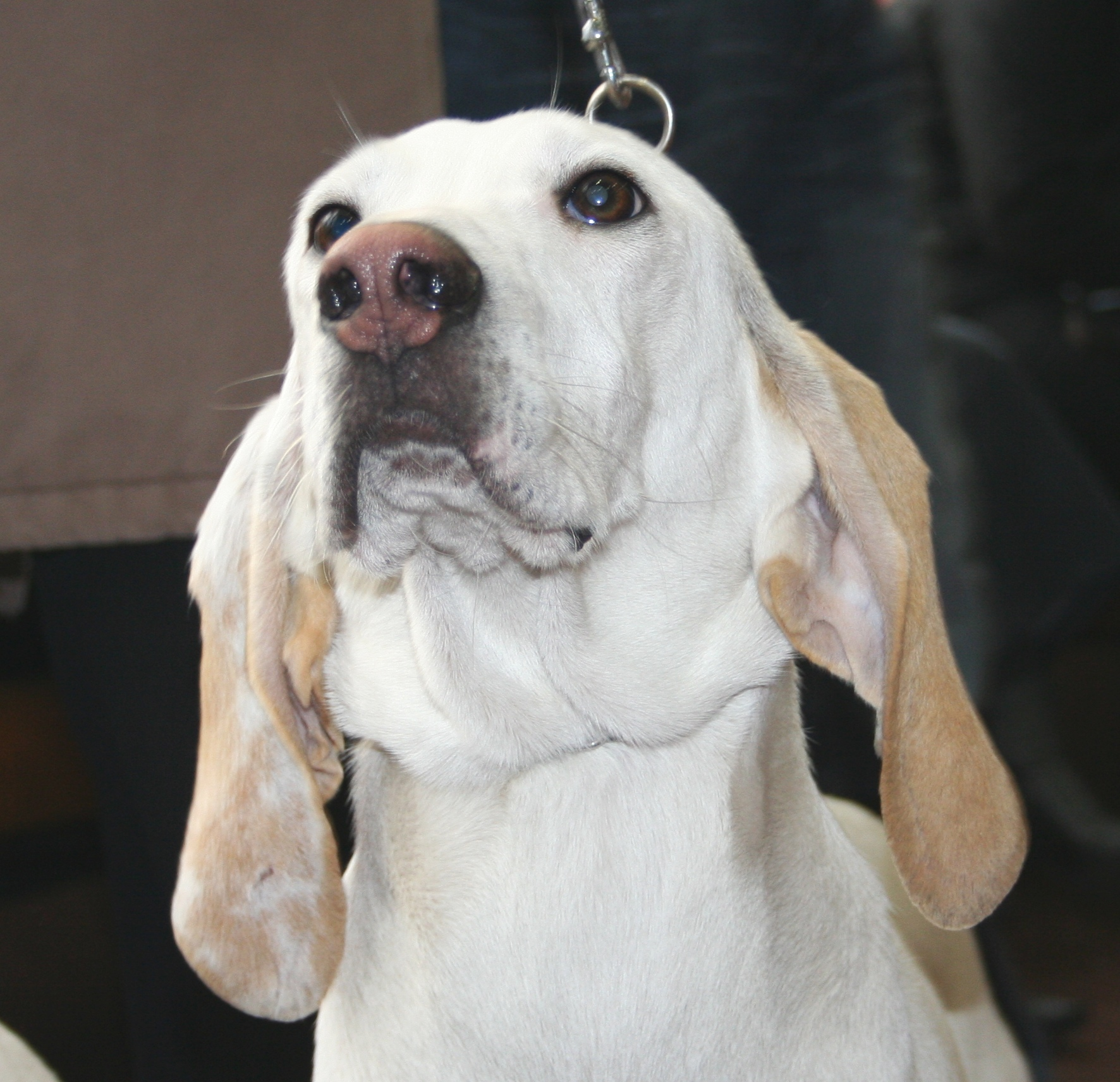
Porcelaine portrait

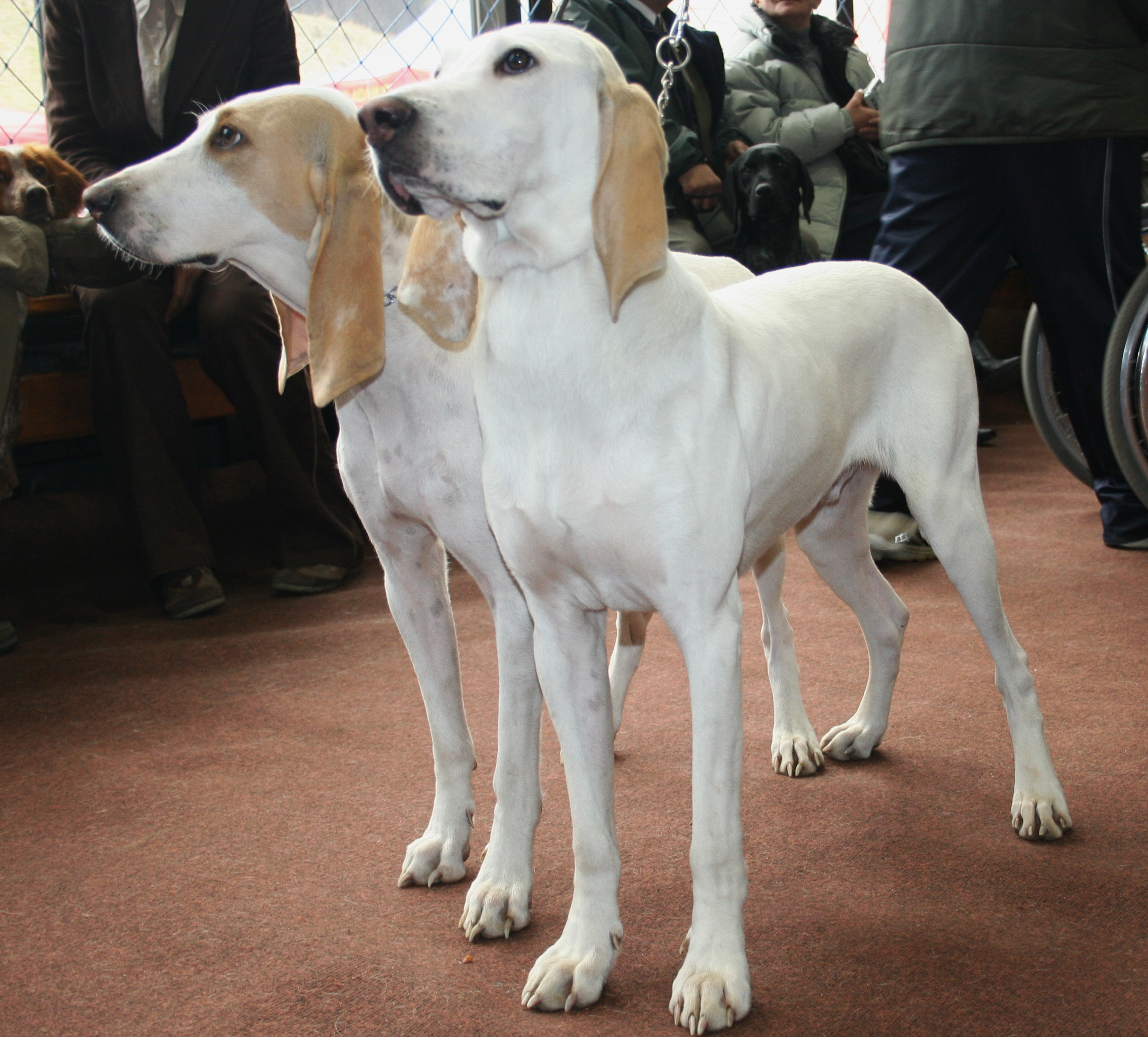
The porcelaine's neck is long

The Porcelaine gets its name from its shiny coat, said to make it resemble a porcelain statuette. The fur is white, sometimes with orange spots, often on the ears. The skin should be white with black mottling that is visible through the white coat. The fur is incredibly short and very fine. The nose of a Porcelaine dog is black with very wide nostrils. It also has black eyes and long ears that droop down. The neck is long and the tail starts thick and narrows to a point at the end.

Height at the withers is in the range 55–58 cm for dogs and 53–56 cm for bitches.

== Use ==
The Porcelaine is a hunting dog usually used to hunt hare, roe deer, and in the north wild boar. The Porcelaines hunt in packs. Being a scent hound, it has a very good sense of smell with which it hunts. The Porcelaine is a fierce hunting dog that has been bred to hunt independently without many orders from the owner. The Porcelaine is also being bred in small numbers in Italy and used to hunt wild boar, however Italian indigenous hounds continue to be the preferred choice of local hunters.
