= Show dog =

Dog entered into a dog show

A show dog might refer to any dog entered into a dog show. More specifically, a show dog is a dog which has been specially bred, trained, and/or groomed to conform to the specifications of dog shows, so as to have a chance of winning. Often used as a single word (showdog), the term is also used within the sport of conformation to refer to a dog that displays a particularly energetic or outgoing character.

== Dog shows ==
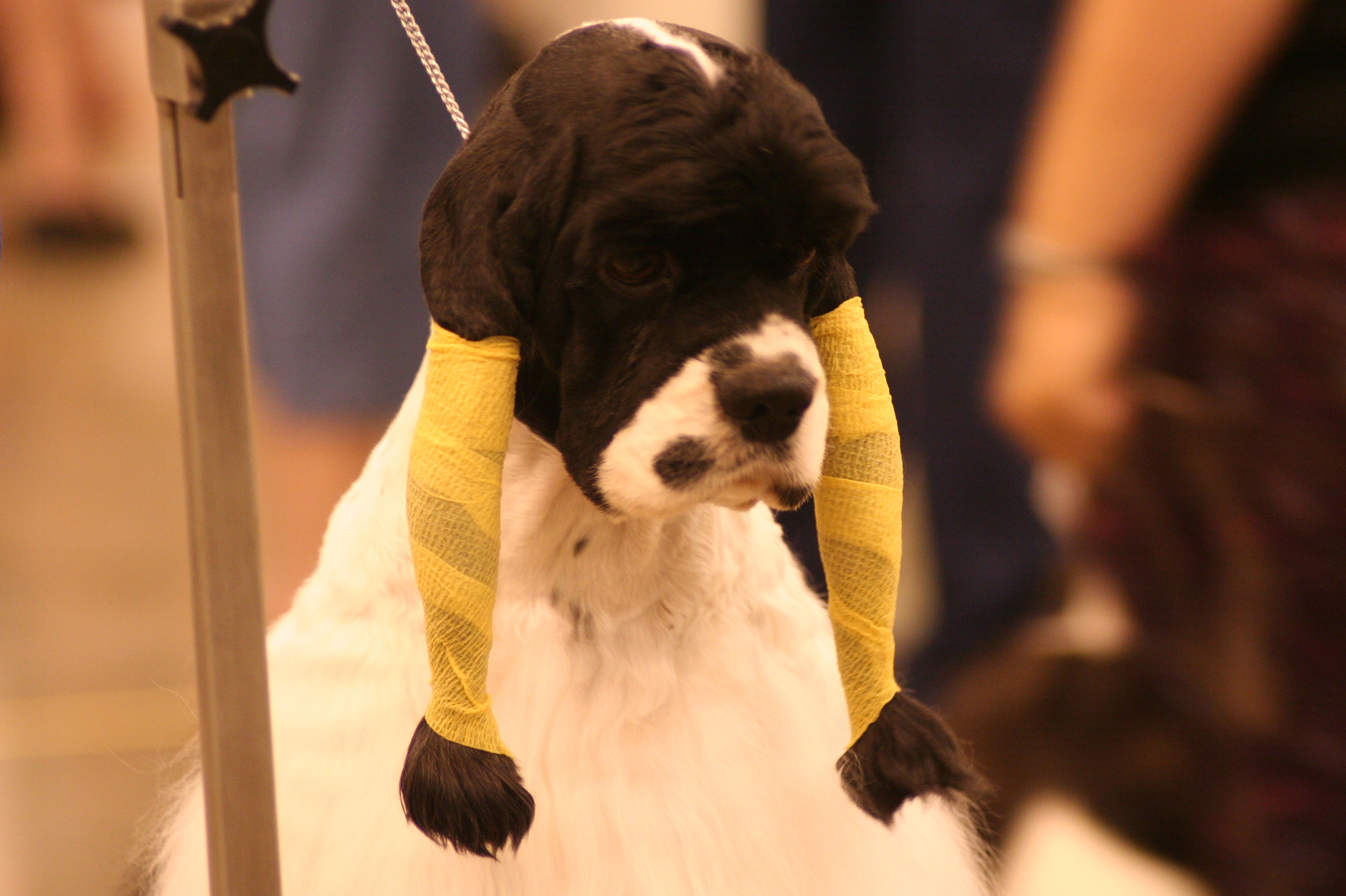
An American Cocker Spaniel with its ears wrapped to protect the fur in grooming for a show

Entry into many sports of dog shows is restricted to purebred dogs registered with the kennel club or breed club sponsoring the show, and dogs are selected by breeding to excel at the particular sport for which they are being shown. .,

Dog shows may be held indoors, in horse arenas or other suitably large spaces, or outdoors on groomed fields. Events at which dogs may be shown vary in the requirements for entry and the amount of preparation required. Types of dog shows include:

- Fun shows: Usually put on by charities for fund raising, these dog shows may offer prizes for costumes or for the largest and smallest dogs entered.
- Tests and Trials: Dog shows that display a dog's training or natural instincts. They may require a great deal of formal training of the dog, as in obedience trials, or none at all, as in herding tests. Some are entertaining spectator dog sports, such as disc dog and dock jumping, and others are of more interest to the dog than to spectators, as in earthdog trials and hunt tests.
- Conformation shows: Originally devised for the selection of breeding stock, conformation showing has evolved into a sport requiring specific training for both the dog and handler, as well as precise grooming requirements (depending on the breed being shown.)

== Criticisms ==
One argument is that the kennel clubs' requirements that breeding be conducted within a breed is tantamount to mandatory, continuous inbreeding as all members of the same breed are related. Another is that whether breeding primarily for appearance or for a particularly desirable working style, too much emphasis is placed on breeding from the few winning stud dogs, causing an already limited gene pool to encounter a genetic bottleneck.

== See also ==
- Coefficient of relationship
- Westminster Kennel Club Dog Show
