= Foxhound =

Type of hunting dog breed

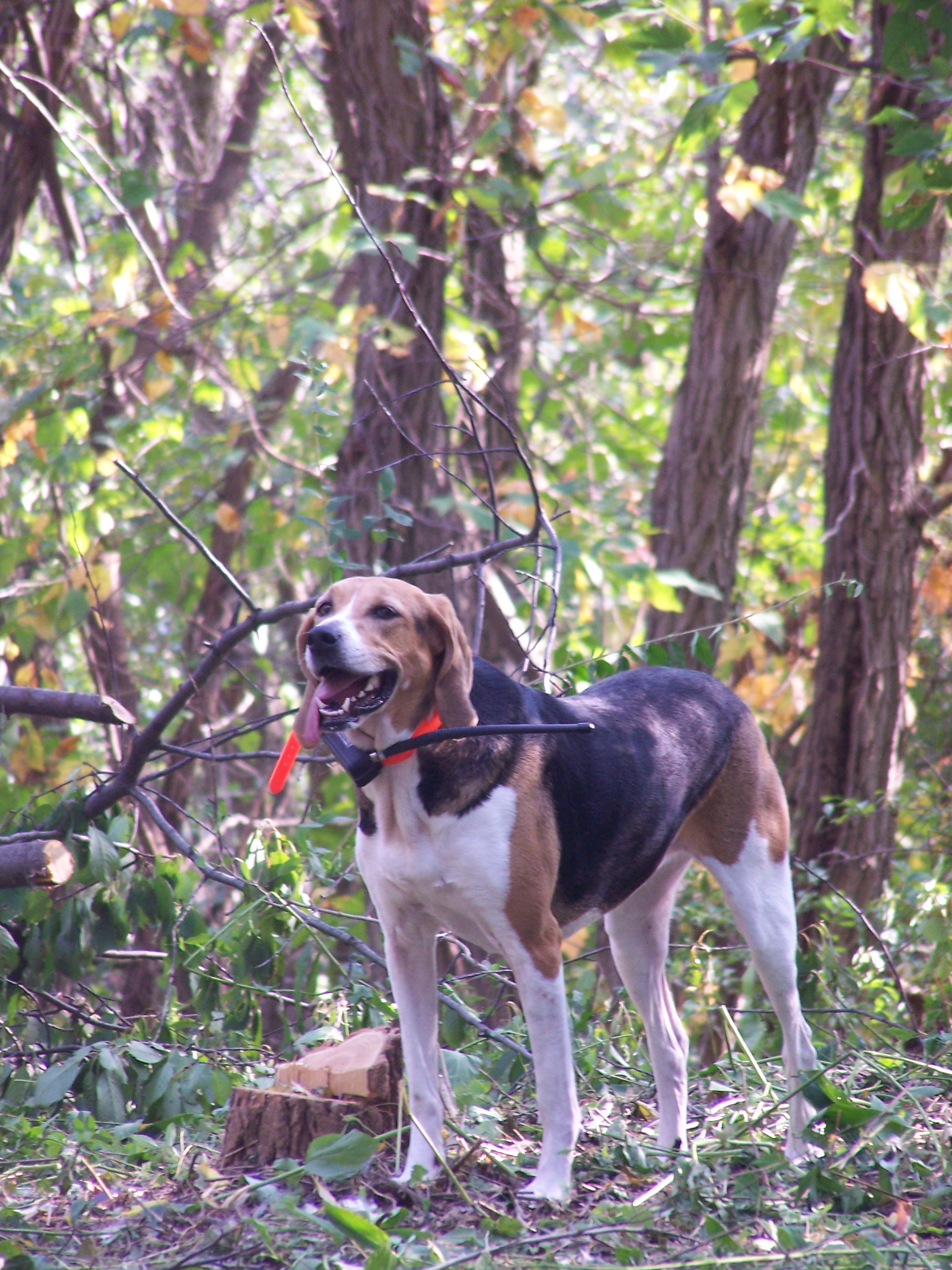
An American Foxhound

A foxhound is a type of large hunting hound bred for strong hunting instincts, a keen sense of smell, and their barking, energy, drive, and speed. In fox hunting, the foxhound's namesake, packs of foxhounds track quarry, followed—usually on horseback—by the hunters, sometimes for several miles at a stretch; moreover, foxhounds also sometimes guard sheep and houses.

There are different breeds of foxhound, each having slightly different characteristics and appearances, and each often called simply Foxhound in their native countries:

- American Foxhound
- Dumfriesshire Black and Tan Foxhound (extinct)
- English Foxhound
- Welsh Foxhound

The American Masters of Foxhounds Association recognizes these breeds of foxhounds: American, Penn-Marydel, English, and crossbred foxhounds. The International Foxhound Association was created in 2012 for the international promotion of the Foxhound as a breed.

== Characteristics ==
Foxhounds are medium-large dogs and males typically weigh 29-32 kg (65-70 lb) and females 27-29 kg (60-65 lb). Height for males measures 55-63 cm (22-25 in) and females 53-60 cm (21-24 in). Foxhounds have a short coat, and long, strong legs, as well as deep chests for lots of lung space. Physically, a foxhound resembles a large beagle.

== Disposition ==
Foxhounds generally display a gentle and affectionate temperament. Foxhounds are highly active and energetic, and therefore require activity and exercise. Foxhounds are sociable and these dogs have great stamina, sense of smell, and enjoy being in a pack, as they are bred for hunting in packs.

== Fox hunting ==
In fox hunting, the foxhound's namesake, packs of foxhounds track and chase fox while hunters follow along on horseback. Fox hunting has shifted over the years and may differ depending on the country. Some changes over time include focusing on chasing rather than killing, and chasing other creatures, such as the coyote, instead of only the fox.

== Most common causes of death ==
Most common causes of death among Foxhound puppies are respiratory disease, anorexia and dehydration, skin disorders, and gastrointestinal disease.

== Respiratory disease in foxhounds ==
A kennel of working, hunting English Foxhounds in the south of England, had an outbreak of tuberculosis (TB) that impacted 180 dogs in late 2016 and early 2017. The kennel housed Foxhound puppies to adults, up to 8 years old. The Foxhounds work among six counties and some of the six counties are in the "Edge Area" that is impacted by bovine tuberculosis.

An investigation occurred which consisted of testing the dogs and looking deeper into the regional area, diet of the dogs, and even more factors while conducting tests and gathering information. The dogs eat raw meat and there was speculation about the diet containing the M. bovis that causes TB as the meat comes from areas impacted by M. bovis.

== Registrations ==
In 2005, the American Kennel Club reported that the English and American Foxhounds were their least and fourth least registered breeds in North America with 22 and 44 registrations, respectively; the top registered breed, the Labrador Retriever, had 137,867 registrations during the same year.

== Notable foxhounds ==
- Sweet Lips and the Virginia Hounds - George Washington bred foxhounds and enjoyed fox hunting. He called his pack of dogs the Virginia Hounds. Sweet Lips was a female foxhound, a product of his vision to breed his pack to produce a "superior dog" who is fast and intelligent.
- The state of Virginia's "state dog" is the American Foxhound.
- Old Drum - said to have been the inspiration for the phrase "Man's Best Friend", which arose from an 1870 court case regarding him.
- Mountain and Muse - In 1814 the Duke of Leeds gave two Irish foxhounds, Mountain and Muse, to a visiting guest, Bolton Jackson. This famous pair of hounds changed hands several times before going to Charles Carroll at his Homewood estate. Descendants of Mountain and Muse still hunt territories in Maryland that were once hunted by George Washington, Thomas Jefferson, Charles Carroll, and the Marquis de Lafayette.
- Colonel - In 2011, Baron von Pfetten's Colonel was Champion of the World Dog Show in Paris and was the first ever English Foxhound invited to compete in the final Champion of Champions competition in Bruxelles that same year.

== See also ==
- American Foxhound
- Anglo-Français and Français (hound)
- English Foxhound
