= Canine terminology =

Words about dogs

Canine terminology in this article refers only to dog terminology, specialized terms describing the characteristics of various external parts of the domestic dog, as well as terms for structure, movement, and temperament. This terminology is not typically used for any of the wild species or subspecies of wild wolves, foxes, coyotes, dholes, jackals or the basal caninae. Dog terminology is often specific to each breed or type of dog. Breed standards use this terminology in the description of the ideal external appearance of each breed, although similar characteristics may be described with different terms in different breeds.

== Dog coats ==
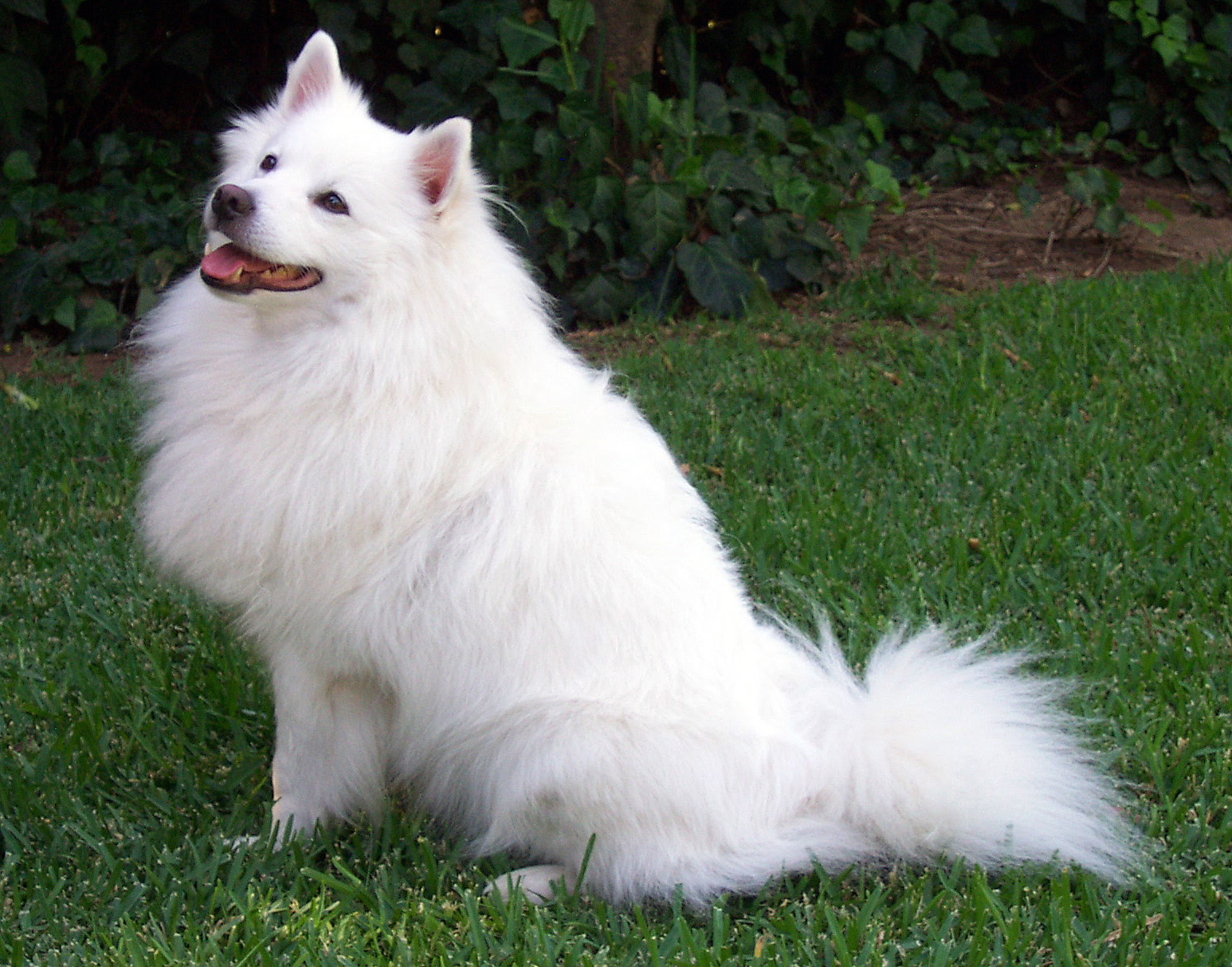
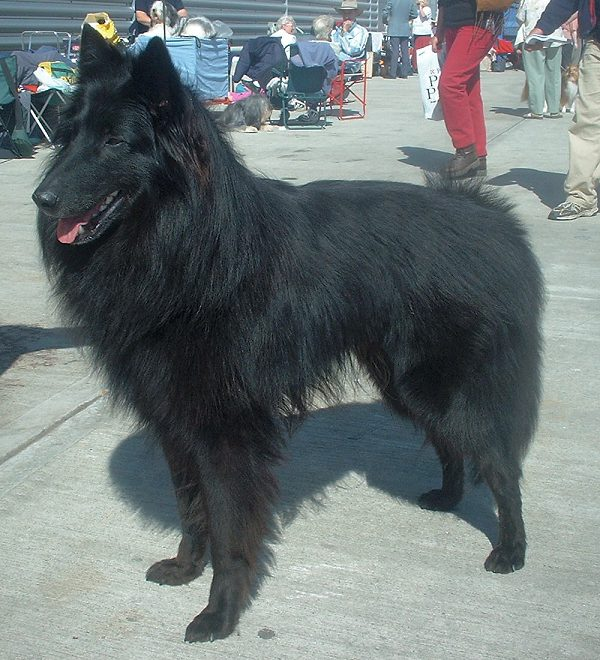
Coat colors range from pure white to solid black and many other variations. Above is a white American Eskimo Dog and a black Belgian Shepherd (Groenendael).

A Stanford University School of Medicine study published in Science in October, 2007 found the genetics that explain coat colors in other mammals such as in horse coats and in cat coats, did not apply to dogs. The project took samples from 38 different breeds to find the gene (a beta defensin gene) responsible for dog coat color. One version produces yellow dogs, and a mutation produces black. All dog coat colors are modifications of black or yellow. For example, the white in white Miniature Schnauzer is a cream color, not albinism (a genotype of e/e at MC1R.)

Today, dogs exhibit a diverse array of fur coats, including dogs without fur, such as the Mexican Hairless Dog. Dog coats vary in texture, color, and markings, and a specialized vocabulary has evolved to describe each characteristic.

=== Color ===
One often refers to a specific dog first by coat color rather than by breed; for example, "a blue merle Aussie" or "a chocolate Lab". Coat colors include:

- Black
- Brown: From mahogany through liver (dark brown).
- Red: Reminiscent of reddish woods such as cherry or mahogany; also tawny, chestnut, orange, rusty, and red-gold.
- Yellow: From pale cream to a deep yellowish-gold tan.
- Gold: From pale apricot to rich reddish-yellow.
- Gray: Pale to dark gray, including silver; can be mixed with other colors or various shades to create sandy pepper, pepper, grizzle, blue-black gray, or silver-fawn.
- Blue: A dark metallic gray, otherwise known as slate; diluted black pigment. Blue merle is genetically black, not blue.
- Sable: Black-tipped hairs; the background color can be gold, silver, gray, or tan.
- White: Distinct from albino dogs.
- Buff: Such as the buff Cocker Spaniel.

All these colors can also be dilute, meaning they become a paler shade of the original color. Blue and cream are both dilute colors.

=== Pattern ===
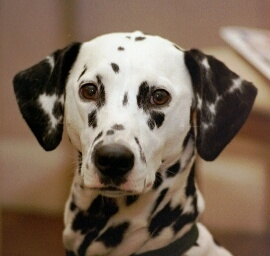
The Dalmatian's coat is one of the more widely recognized markings.

Coat patterns include:

- Bicolor: such as black and tan, red and white. The coat has both colors but in clearly defined and separated areas; usually the top and sides are darker and lower legs and underside are the lighter color.
- Tricolor: Consisting of three colors, usually black, tan, and white or liver, tan, and white.
- Brindle: A mixture of black with brown, tan, or gold, usually in a "tiger stripe" pattern. Sometimes called grizzle when the pattern is not in lines.
- Roan: A kind of ticking on the hair where half the fur is one color and the other half is a different color. In English Setters, this color pattern is called a Belton pattern.
- Harlequin: "Torn" patches of black on white.
- Merle: Marbled coat with darker patches and spots of the specified color.
- Particolor: Two-colored coat with the colors appearing in patches in roughly equal quantities.
- Tuxedo: Solid (usually black) with a white patch (shirt front) on the chest, and white on some or all of the feet (spats.) This pattern is sometimes called Irish Spotting, Flashy, or Boston.
- Blenheim: A red and white pattern found in Cavalier King Charles Spaniels.
- Domino: A specific facial and body pattern in Afghan Hounds caused by a certain genotype.

=== Texture ===
Coat textures vary tremendously. Some coats make the dogs more cuddly and others make them impervious to cold water. Densely furred breeds such as most sled dogs and Spitz types can have up to 600 hairs per inch, while fine-haired breeds such as the Yorkshire Terrier can have as few as 100, and the "hairless" breeds such as the Mexican Hairless Dog and the Peruvian Inca Orchid have none on parts of their bodies. The texture of the coat often depends on the distribution and the length of the two parts of a dog's coat, its thick, warm undercoat (or down) and its rougher, somewhat weather-resistant outer coat (topcoat, also referred to as guard hairs). Breeds with soft coats often have more or longer undercoat hairs than guard hairs; rough-textured coats often have more or longer guard hairs. Textures include:

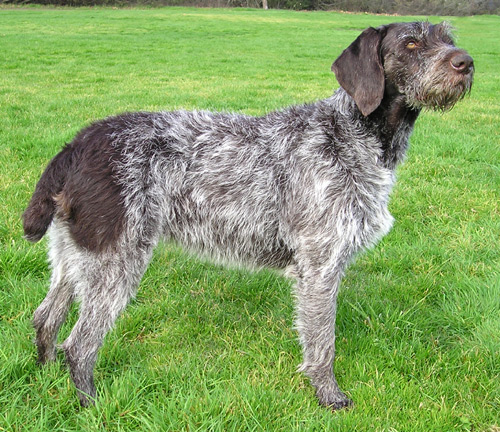
The German Wirehaired Pointer's coat demonstrates a rough texture.

- Double-coated: Having a thick, warm, short undercoat (or down) that is usually dense enough to resist penetration by water and a stronger, rougher weather-resistant outer coat (topcoat), also referred to as guard hairs. Most other coat types are also double-coated.
- Single-coated: Lacking an undercoat.
- Smooth-coated: "Smooth" to the eye and touch.
- Wire-haired: Also called broken-coated. The harsh outer guard hairs are prominent, providing excellent weather protection for hunting dogs such as the Border Terrier or Wirehaired Pointing Griffon.
- Long-haired: Hair longer than an inch or so.
- Short-haired: Hair around an inch or so long.
- Corded coat: for example, see Puli

== Parts of the body ==
A special vocabulary has been developed to describe the characteristics of various body parts of the dog. Terms are often specific to each breed or type of dog.

=== Head ===
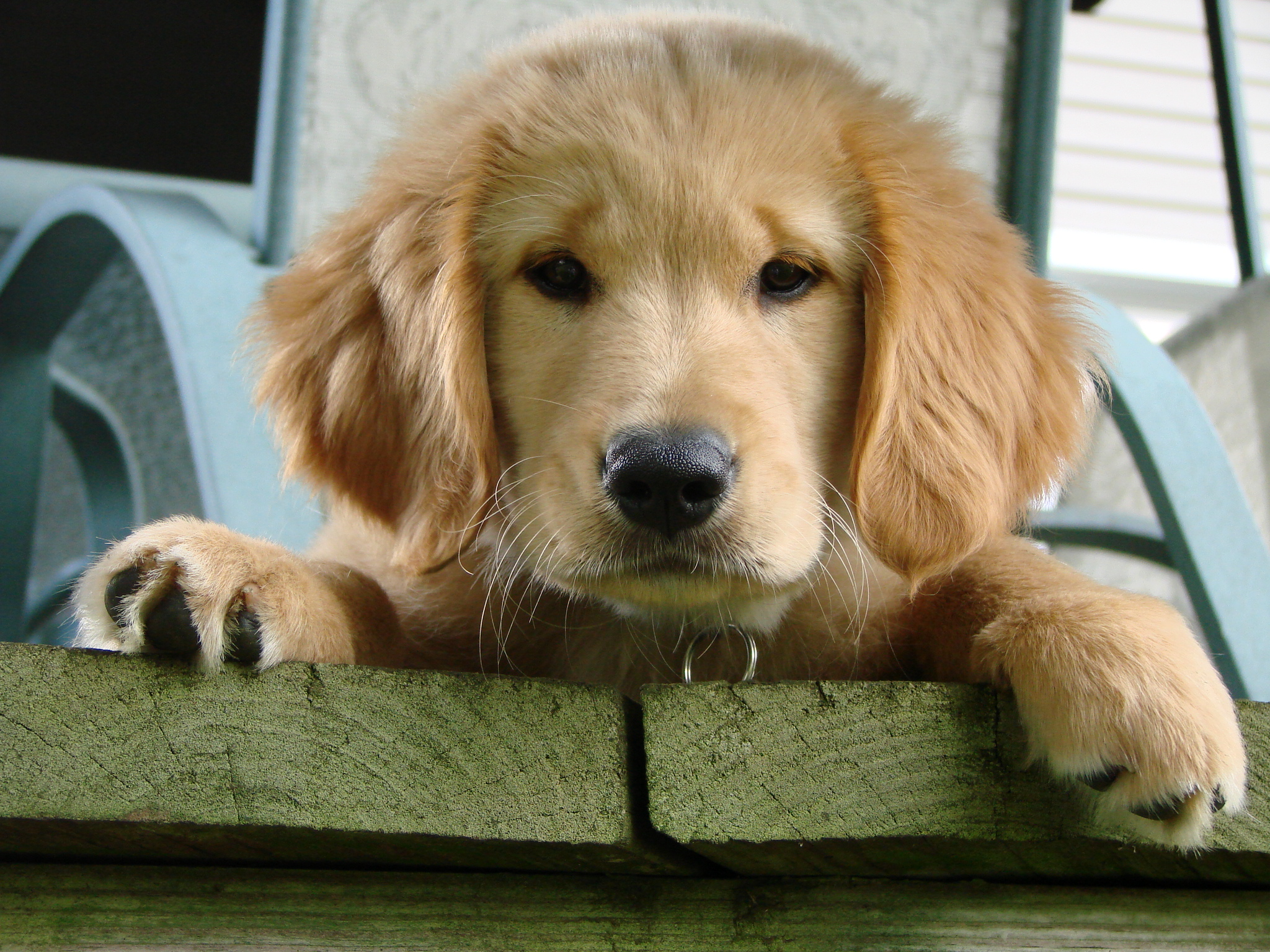
Golden Retriever puppy

The parts of the head are the nose, muzzle, stop, forehead or braincase, occiput (highest point of the skull at the back of the head), ears, eyes, eyebrows or brows, whiskers, flews (lips, which may hang down), and cheeks.

Dog heads are of three basic shapes:

- Apple-headed refers to a dog's head that is round on top, not flat.
- Brachycephalic, or shortened muzzled, sometimes so short that it can lead to breathing problems, such as in the Pug.
- Dish-faced refers to a dog whose nasal bone is higher at the nose than at the stop.
- Dolichocephalic, or long and narrow, as seen in most "hounds" like a Borzoi or other breeds such as the Rough Collie and the grey wolf.
- Down-faced, a convex facial structure where the muzzle is turned slightly downward when looked at from the dogs profile, such as a Bull Terrier.
- Mesocephalic, or wedge shaped (broad skull with a narrower muzzle).

==== Nose ====
- Butterfly nose is of two colors.
- Dudley nose is a flesh-colored nose.

==== Muzzle ====
A snipey muzzle is one that is too pointed for good breed type.

==== Stop ====
The stop is the degree of angle change between the skull and the nasal bone near the eyes. Also the indentation between the eyes where the nose and skull meet.

==== Occiput ====
The occiput in dog terms is the bump or protuberance clearly seen at the back of the skull in some breeds like the English Setter and Bloodhound. However, in other breeds it is barely perceptible. Myths in dog folklore believed that size of the occipital protuberance was somehow a measure of the dog's sense of smell. So to this day it is prominent in most Scent Hounds. However, technically the occipital bone extends right down the back of the head to where it articulates with the neck. So when breed standards refer to the length of a dog's skull, they rarely include the occiput in this measurement. The occiput has many nerve endings and stimulates calming effects to do with the flight or fight system. It is used in canine therapeutic massage to calm the dogs.

==== Ears ====
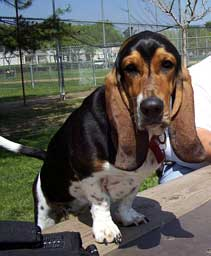
The Basset Hound's ears are extremely long drop ears.

Dogs' ears come in a variety of sizes, shapes, lengths, positions on the head, and amounts and types of droop. Every variation has a term, including:

- Bat ear: Erect, broad next to the head and rounded at the tip, such as the ears on a Chihuahua or a French Bulldog.
- Button ear: A smaller ear where the tip folds forward nearly to the skull, forming a V, as in the Jack Russell Terrier.
- Cropped ear: Shaped by cutting; see cropping.
- Drop ear: An ear that folds and droops close to the head, such as the little known Blue Lacy. Also called a pendant ear.
- Natural: Like a wolf's.
- Prick ear: Erect and pointed; also called pricked or erect.
- Rose ear: A very small drop ear that folds back; as in the greyhound or bulldog.
- Semiprick ear: A prick ear where the tip just begins to fold forward, as in the Rough Collie.
- Hound ear: Floppy ear that is long and droopy enough to collect air around the nostrils, as in scent hounds and spaniels.

==== Eyes ====
A dog's vision is actually equivalent to a human with red-green color blindness. Different breeds have different shapes of eyes. It all depends on the purpose. If a dog is a hunter, they most definitely need good eyesight. Therefore, those breeds have a wider range of vision than others. As a rule of thumb, breeds with short heads have a narrower field of vision, whereas breeds with longer heads have a wider field of vision - such as wolf, sighthound.

==== Eyebrows or brows ====
Eyebrows not necessarily noticeable just normal defined brow line above the eyes.

==== Whiskers ====
Whiskers tend to be similar to most breeds of Pitbull/Terrier dogs. Medium to long whiskers, wispy but coarse feeling to the touch.

==== Flews ====
Flews are a dog's upper lips, or the canine equivalent of upper lips.

==== Mouth and teeth ====
The bite describes how the dog's teeth meet when the mouth is closed. Usually have wide mouths and good teeth, these breeds can benefit from getting their teeth brushed regularly due to such wide areas in their mouths.

=== Body ===
The body may be described as "cobby" (short and square) or sometimes by a ratio of height to length.

=== Withers ===
The ridge between the shoulder blades; often it is the tallest point of the body.

=== Skin ===
The skin for this specific breed is normal but can get itchy at times, these dogs need regular bathing at least every month or two.

=== Legs and gait ===
==== Legs ====
Strong but lean muscular build in the arms and legs. Broad build at the top of the leg and slims by the feet and ankle area.

==== Gait ====
- Single suspension gallop: The dog supports its weight with its feet in the unsymmetrical sequence RF, LF, RH, LH.
- Double suspension gallop: The front legs are in full extension forward while the rear legs are in full extension rearward.

=== Feet ===
One way a dog releases heat from its body is from in between its paws. Some dogs have a seemingly superfluous claw at the base of their foot. This is known as a dewclaw.

=== Tails ===
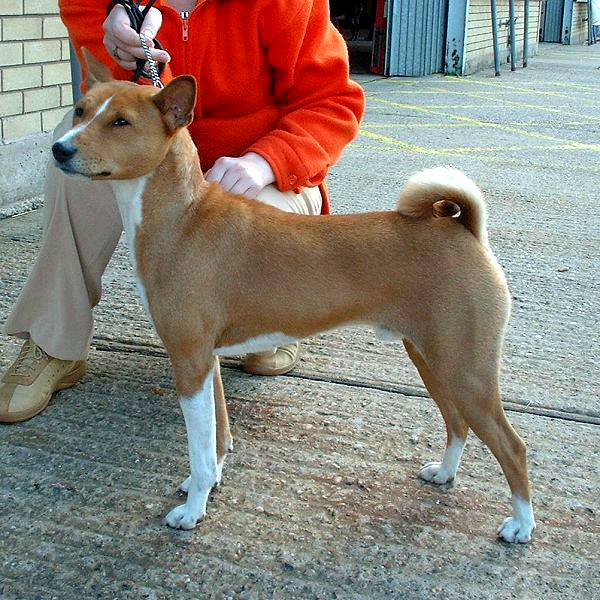
The Basenji's tail is tightly curled.

Like ears, tails come in a tremendous variety of shapes, lengths, amounts of fur, and tailsets (positions). Among them:

- Bob: Short or non-existent tail, such as an Australian Shepherd or Pembroke Welsh Corgi.
- Corkscrew: Short and twisted, such as a Pug's
- Docked: Shortened by surgery or other method, usually two or three days after birth; see docking
- Odd: Twisted, but not short. Uncommon. Tibetan Terriers have odd tails.
- Saber: Carried in a slight curve like a saber
- Sickle: Carried out and up in a semicircle like a sickle
- Squirrel: Carried high and towards the head, often with the tip curving even further towards the head.
- Wheel: Carried up and over the back in a broad curve, resembling a wheel.

== See also ==
- Conformation (dog)
- Gait (dog)
- Coat (dog)
- Dog anatomy
- Temperament
- Grooming
- Junior Showmanship
