= Société Centrale Canine =

French kennel club

- Formation: 1881; 145 years ago
- Type: Kennel club
- Region served: France
- Official language: French
- Website: www.centrale-canine.fr

The Société centrale canine (French pronunciation: [sɔsjete sɑ̃tʁal kanin], "Central Canine Society"), officially the Société Centrale Canine pour l'Amélioration des Races de Chiens en France and abbreviated SCC, is a French kennel club founded in 1881. It is made up of regional clubs and breed clubs, and coordinates and regulates activities and connections between governmental groups and dog clubs, as well as activities through the Fédération cynologique internationale, where it was one of the original five founding member organizations in 1911.

== History ==
The SCC was founded in 1881, to sponsor dog shows in France as The Kennel Club was doing in England.

In 1885, the Book of French Origin (Livre des origines français, L.O.F.) for the preservation of native dog breeds was begun through the SCC. In 1957, the French Ministry of Agriculture recognised the L.O.F. with other animal records, and it became the official French listing for purebred dogs. Today, all purebred dogs are listed in this register, subject to checking and restrictions. The parent dogs must be certified for breeding, and the puppy certified by inspection of an SCC judge between 10 and 15 months of age. French legal code allows only L.O.F. certified and registered dogs to be sold as purebred. Stud books for specific breeds within the L.O.F. may be either open or closed, and there is a mechanism for recognising dogs with unregistered parents, by visual inspection. After three generations (number of generations set by law) the descendants are registered without additional separate inspections.

== Organization ==
The SCC has a President with four vice-presidents, a secretary-general and adjunct, and a treasurer and adjunct. There is a 26 member committee, made up of representatives from regional kennel clubs, breed clubs, and dog activity clubs. Reporting to the committee is a general assembly from all of the regional and specialty clubs, with one member for every 50 to 300 members of the club being represented. In addition, there are commissions for education, scientific research, judges' training and the L.O.F., shows, and many other topics of interest to dog fanciers.

== Titles ==
Société centrale canine dog show titles and terms used in French dog shows:

- CACS : Certificate of conformation to the breed standard
- CACIB : Certificate of fitness for an International Conformation Championship
- BOB / BOG : Best Of Breed / Best Of Group)
- BIS : Best In Show
- Ch.Int. or CHIB : International Champion
- TAN : Test of natural aptitude (working degree)
- CACT : Certificate of working championship
- CACIT : Certificate of International working championship
- CHIT : International working champion (Champion International Travail)
- CHTGT : Champion Work on Drawn Game (Champion Travail sur Gibier Tiré)
- TR : Trialer (for this title the "dog must receive an Excellent rating in both a spring and fall field trial plus an Excellent rating in a conformation show")

== See also ==
- Fédération Cynologique Internationale
- Dog sports
