= Hound =

Type of hunting dog

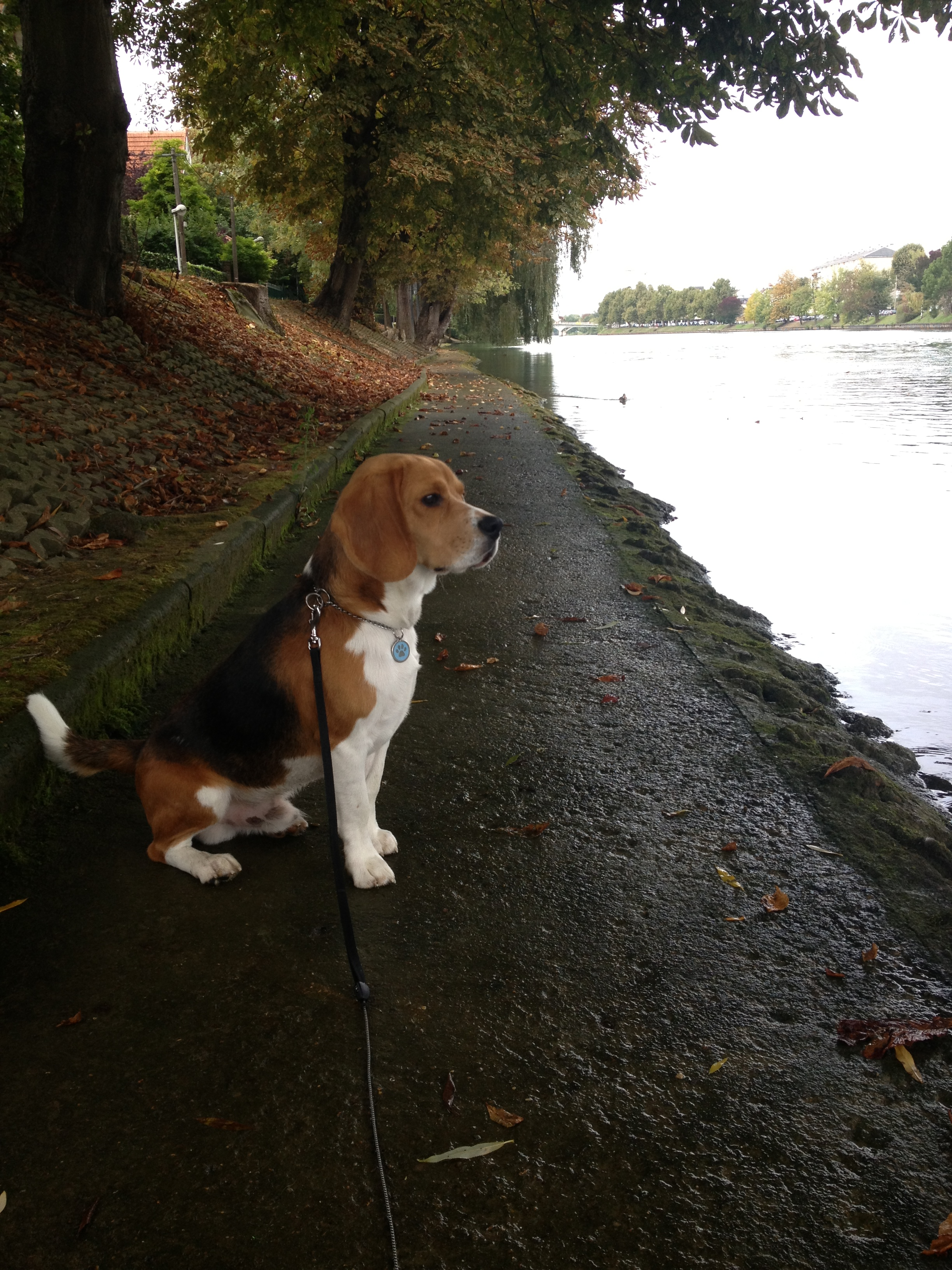
A beagle is a small breed of hound.

A hound is a type of hunting dog used by hunters to track or chase prey. Hounds are a diverse group of dogs, but all of them have been bred specifically for hunting.

== Description ==
Hounds can be contrasted with gun dogs that assist hunters by identifying prey and/or recovering shot quarry. The hound breeds were the first hunting dogs. They have either a powerful sense of smell, great speed, or both. There are three types of hound, with several breeds within each type:

- Sighthounds (also called gazehounds) follow prey predominantly by speed, keeping it in sight. These dogs are fast and assist hunters in catching game: fox, hare, deer, and elk.
- Scenthounds follow prey or others (like missing people) by tracking its scent. These dogs have endurance, but are not fast runners.
- The remaining breeds of hound follow their prey using both sight and scent. They are difficult to classify, as they are neither strictly sighthounds nor strictly scenthounds.

== List of hound breeds ==
- Afghan Hound
- Africanis
- Alpine Dachsbracke
- American Foxhound
- American Leopard Hound
- Andalusian Hound
- Artois Hound
- Austrian Black and Tan Hound
- Azawakh
- Basenji
- Basset Artesien Normand
- Basset Bleu de Gascogne
- Basset Fauve de Bretagne
- Basset Hound
- Bavarian Mountain Hound
- Beagle
- Beagle-Harrier
- Billy
- Black and Tan Coonhound
- Blackmouth Cur
- Bloodhound
- Bluetick Coonhound
- Borzoi
- Bosnian Broken-haired Hound
- Briquet Griffon Vendéen
- Chippiparai
- Cirneco dell'Etna
- Colombian Fino Hound
- Combai
- Coonhound
- Cretan Hound
- Dachshund
- Drever
- Dumfriesshire Black and Tan Foxhound
- Estonian Hound
- English Coonhound
- English Foxhound
- Feist
- Finnish Hound
- Galgo Español
- Gascon Saintongeois
- German Hound
- Grand Basset Griffon Vendéen
- Grand Bleu de Gascogne
- Grand Fauve de Bretagne
- Grand Griffon Vendéen
- Greek Harehound
- Greyhound
- Griffon Bleu de Gascogne
- Griffon Fauve de Bretagne
- Hamiltonstövare
- Hanover Hound
- Harrier
- Hortaya borzaya
- Ibizan Hound
- Indian pariah dog
- Italian Greyhound
- Irish Wolfhound
- Istrian Coarse-haired Hound
- Istrian Shorthaired Hound
- Kai Ken
- Kanni
- Kishu Ken
- Lakeland Trailhound
- Lithuanian Hound
- Longdog
- Lurcher
- Magyar agár
- Mountain Cur
- Mudhol Hound
- Otterhound
- Petit Basset Griffon Vendéen
- Petit Bleu de Gascogne
- Pharaoh Hound
- Plott Hound
- Podenco Canario
- Polish Greyhound
- Polish Hound
- Portuguese Podengo
- Posavac Hound
- Rajapalayam
- Rampur Greyhound
- Rastreador Brasileiro
- Redbone Coonhound
- Rhodesian Ridgeback
- Sabueso Español
- Saluki
- Schillerstövare
- Segugio dell'Appennino
- Segugio Italiano a Pelo Forte
- Segugio Italiano a Pelo Raso
- Segugio Maremmano
- Serbian Hound
- Serbian Tricolour Hound
- Schweizer Laufhund
- Schweizerischer Niederlaufhund
- Scottish Deerhound
- Shikoku
- Silken Windhound
- Sloughi
- Slovenský kopov or Slovak Hound
- Smålandsstövare
- Styrian Coarse-haired Hound
- Taigan
- Tatranský durič or Tatra Hound
- Thai Ridgeback
- Treeing Walker Coonhound
- Trigg Hound
- Transylvanian Hound
- Tyrolean Hound
- Welsh Foxhound
- Westphalian Dachsbracke
- Whippet

== See also ==
- Dog type
- Hunting dog
- Scent hound
- Sighthound
