= Serbian Tricolour Hound =

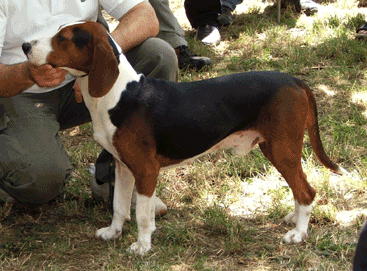
- Other names: Srpski Trobojni Gonič
- Origin: Serbia
Traits
Height	Males	45–55 cm (18–22 in)
	Females	44–54 cm (17–21 in)
- Weight: 20–25 kg (44–55 lb)
- Coat: Short
- Colour: Tri-coloured
Kennel club standards
- Kinološki Savez Srbije: standard
- Fédération Cynologique Internationale: standard

The Serbian Tricolour Hound (Serbian: српски тробојни гонич, romanized: srpski trobojni gonič) is a breed of scent hound from Serbia.

== History ==
The Serbian Tricolour Hound, like the closely related Serbian Hound, Montenegrin Mountain Hound, Posavac Hound, Istrian Shorthaired Hound, Istrian Coarse-haired Hound and Barak Hound, is believed to have descended from hounds traded by Mediterranean seafarers through ports on the Adriatic coast. All scent hounds, these breeds are believed to also have some early sighthound blood in their ancestry.

According to Serbia's national kennel club the Kinološki Savez Srbije, the Serbian Tricolour Hound was initially considered a variety of the Serbian Hound, but in 1946 a separate breed standard was drawn up and it was granted separate recognition. The breed was recognised by the Fédération Cynologique Internationale in 1961. Originally called the Yugoslavian Tricolour Hound, the breed's name was changed after the breakup of Yugoslavia.

Rarely seen outside of its homeland, the Serbian Tricolour Hound is considered extremely rare and at possible risk of extinction.

== Description ==
=== Appearance ===
The Serbian Tricolour Hound is a moderately sized scent hound that is very similar to the black and tan coloured Montenegrin Mountain Hound, but typically is slightly lighter in build. According to the Kinološki Savez Srbije's breed standard, dogs typically stand between 45 and 55 centimetres (18 and 22 in) with an ideal height of 51 centimetres (20 in), whilst bitches are slightly shorter standing between 44 and 54 centimetres (17 and 21 in) with an ideal height of 49 centimetres (19 in). Healthy adult Serbian Hounds typically weigh between 20 and 25 kilograms (44 and 55 lb). Their bodies are slightly longer than they are tall, they have long legs and good bone.

The breed's coat is short, thick, glossy and course to touch, it provides the breed with good protection from the elements; in colour they are predominantly black and fawn with a white around the neck, on the chest on their extremities and a blaze on the face.

=== Character ===
The Serbian Tricolour Hound is usually affectionate and obedient, forming a particularly strong bonds with their masters. Tranquil and relaxed in the home environment, the breed is known to be particularly energetic when working.

== Use ==
Serbian Tricolour Hounds are versatile hunters often hunted in small packs, predominantly they hunt by scent but they also utilising their very good vision. The breed is used to hunt hare, fox, deer and wild boar, the terrain they are typically hunted over is known to be difficult and the hunts are known to continue for many hours at a time.

== See also ==
- List of dog breeds
