= Scent hound =

Dog type, hunting dog

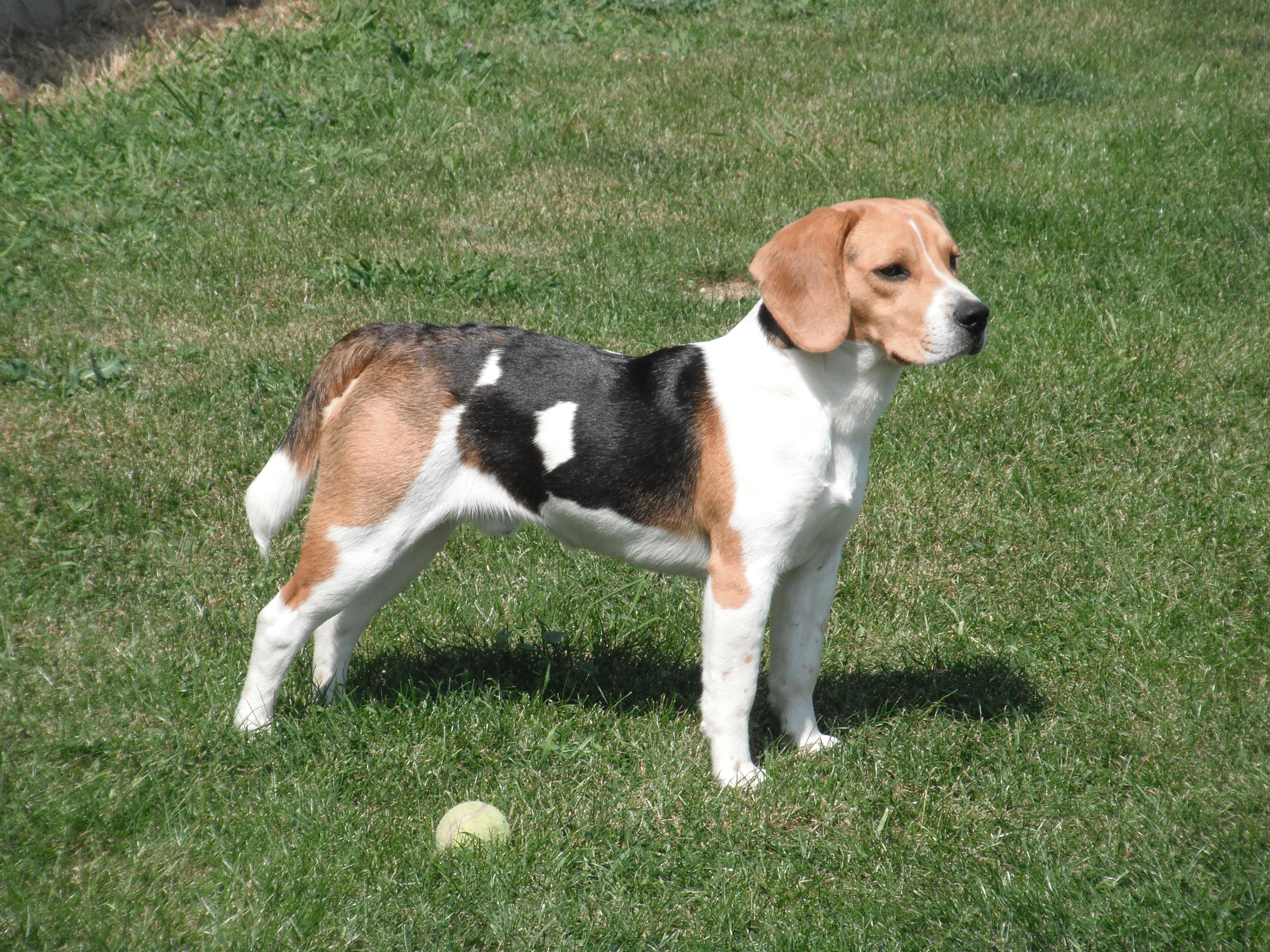
The Beagle: long ears, large nasal passages, and a sturdy body for endurance

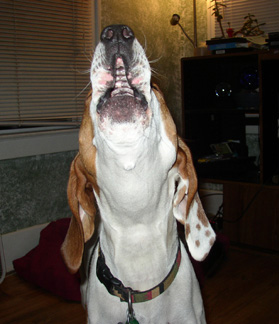
A Treeing Walker Coonhound baying

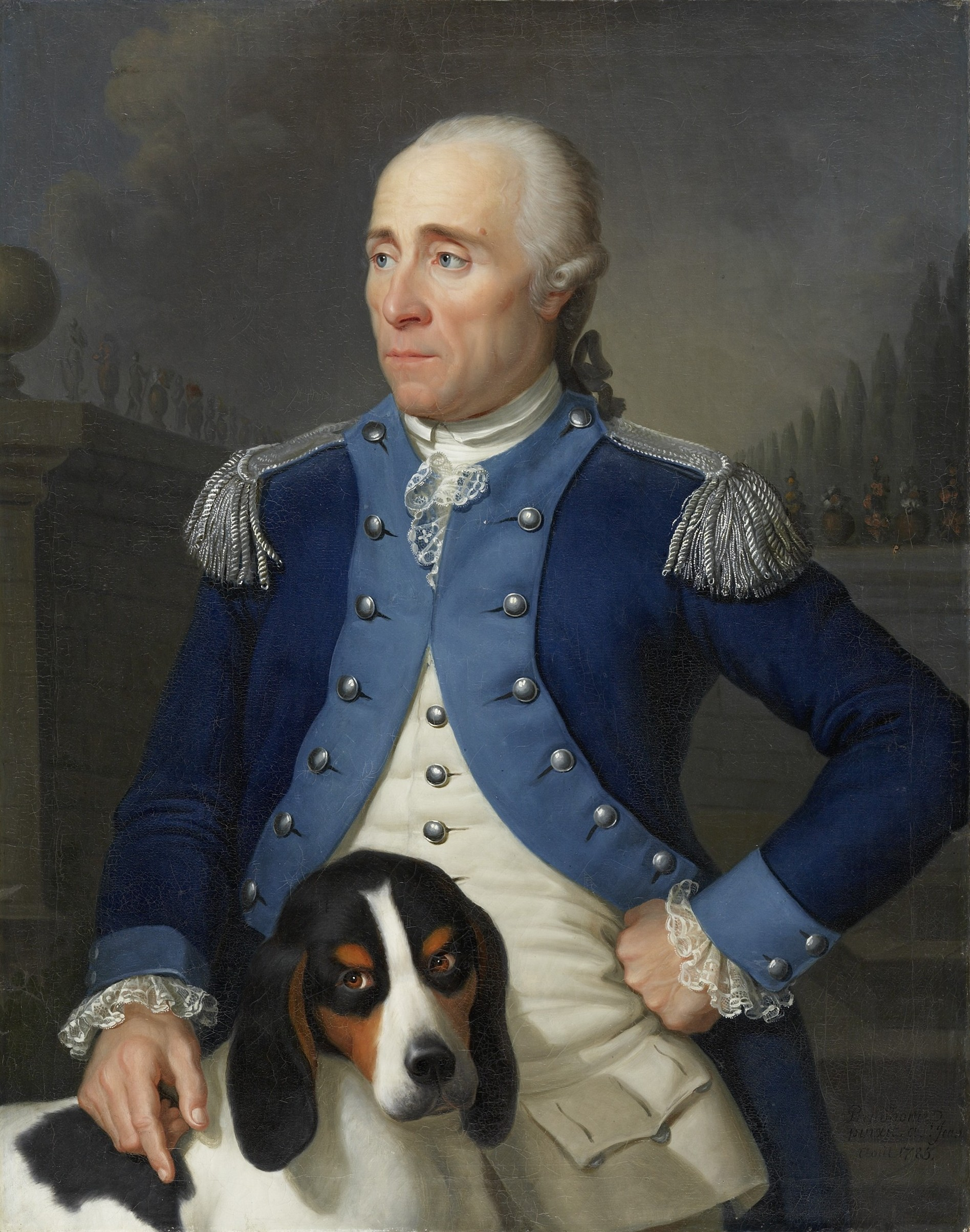
Franz Rudolf Frisching in the uniform of an officer of the Bernese Huntsmen Corps with his Berner Laufhund, painted by Jean Preudhomme in 1785

Scent hounds (or scenthounds) are a type of hound that primarily hunts by scent rather than sight. These breeds are hunting dogs and are generally regarded as having some of the most sensitive noses among dogs. Scent hounds specialize in following scent or smells. Most of them tend to have long, drooping ears and large nasal cavities to enhance smell sensitivity. They need to have relatively high endurance to be able to keep track of scent over long distances and rough terrain. It is believed that they were first bred by the Celts by crossbreeding mastiff-type dogs with sighthounds. The first established scent hounds were St. Hubert Hounds (the ancestor of today's bloodhounds) bred by monks in Belgium during the Middle Ages.

== Description ==
Hounds are hunting dogs that hunt either by following the scent of a game animal (scent hounds) or by following the animal by sight (sighthounds). There are many breeds in the scent hound type, and scent hounds may do other work as well, so exactly which breeds should be called scent hound can be controversial. Kennel clubs assign breeds of dogs to groups, which are loosely based on breed types. Each kennel club determines which breeds it will place in a given group.

Scent hounds specialize in following a smell or scent. Most of these breeds have long, drooping ears. One theory says that this trait helps to collect scent from the air and keep it near the dog's face and nose. They also have large nasal cavities, which helps them scent better. Their typically loose, moist lips are said to assist in trapping scent particles.

Because scent hounds tend to walk or run with their noses to the ground, many scent hound breeds have been developed such that the dog will hold their tail upright when on a scent. In addition, some breeds (e.g., beagle) have been bred to have white hair on the tips of their tails. These traits allow the dog's master to identify it at a distance or in longer grass.

Scent hounds do not need to be as fast as sighthounds, because they do not need to keep prey in sight, but they need endurance so they can stick with a scent and follow it for long distances over rough terrain. The best scent hounds can follow a scent trail even across running water and even when it is several days old. Most scent hounds are used for hunting in packs of multiple dogs. Longer-legged hounds run more quickly and usually require that the hunters follow on horseback; shorter-legged hounds allow hunters to follow on foot. Hunting with some breeds, such as German Bracke, American Foxhounds, or coonhounds, involves allowing the pack of dogs to run freely while the hunters wait in a fixed spot until the dogs' baying announces that the game has been "treed". The hunters then go to the spot on foot, following the sound of the dogs' baying.

== Vocalization ==
Most scent hounds have a range of vocalizations, which can vary depending upon the situation the dog finds itself in. Their baying voice—most often used when excited and useful in informing their master that they are following a scent trail—is deep and booming and can be distinct from their barking voice, which itself can have variations in tone, from excited to nervous or fearful.

As they are bred to "give voice" when excited, scent hounds may bark much more frequently than other dog breeds. Although this can be a nuisance in settled areas, it is a valuable trait that allows the dog's handler to follow the dog or pack of dogs during a hunt even when they are out of sight, such as when following a fox or raccoon through woodland.

== Classification ==
The Fédération Cynologique Internationale (FCI) places scent hounds into their classification "Group 6". This includes a subdivision, "Section 2, Leash Hounds", some examples of which are the Bavarian Mountain Hound (Bayrischer Gebirgsschweisshund, no. 217), the Hanover Hound (Hannover'scher Schweisshund, no. 213), and the Alpine Dachsbracke (Alpenländische Dachsbracke, no. 254). In addition, the Dalmatian and the Rhodesian Ridgeback are placed in Group 6 as "Related breeds".

== Genetic history ==
Genetic studies indicate that the scent hounds are more closely related to each other than they are with other branches on the dog family tree.

== Breeds ==
The scent hound type includes the following breeds:

- Alpine Dachsbracke
- American Leopard Hound
- Anglo-French hounds (French hounds crossed with English Foxhounds)
  - Anglo-Français de Petite Vénerie
  - Grand Anglo-Français Blanc et Noir
  - Grand Anglo-Français Blanc et Orange
  - Grand Anglo-Français Tricolore
- Ariegeois
- Artois Hound
- Austrian Black and Tan Hound
- Basset Artésien Normand
- Basset Bleu de Gascogne
- Basset Fauve de Bretagne
- Basset Hound
- Bavarian Mountain Hound
- Beagle
- Beagle-Harrier
- Billy
- Black Mouth Cur
- Bloodhound
- Blue Lacy
- Bosnian Broken-haired Hound
- Briquet Griffon Vendéen
- Bulgarian Scenthound
- Catahoula Leopard Dog
- Coonhounds
  - Black and Tan Coonhound
  - Bluetick Coonhound
  - English Coonhound (a.k.a. American English Coonhound and Redtick Coonhound)
  - Redbone Coonhound
  - Treeing Walker Coonhound
- Cretan Hound
- Dachshund
- Deutsche Bracke
- Drever (Swedish Dachsbracke)
- Dunker (Norwegian Hound)
- Estonian Hound
- Finnish Hound
- Foxhounds
  - American Foxhound
  - English Foxhound
  - Dumfriesshire Black and Tan Foxhound (extinct)
  - Welsh Foxhound
- French hounds
  - Chien Français Blanc et Noir
  - Chien Français Blanc et Orange
  - Chien Français Tricolore
- Grand Basset Griffon Vendéen
- Grand Bleu de Gascogne
- Grand Gascon Saintongeois
- Grand Griffon Vendéen
- Greek Harehound
- Griffon Bleu de Gascogne
- Griffon Fauve de Bretagne
- Hamiltonstövare
- Hanover Hound
- Harrier
- Istrian Coarse-haired Hound
- Istrian Shorthaired Hound
- Kerry Beagle
- Laconian (extinct)
- Limer (obsolete term)
- Montenegrin Mountain Hound
- Mountain Cur
- North Country Beagle (Northern Hound) (extinct)
- Otterhound
- Petit Basset Griffon Vendéen
- Petit Bleu de Gascogne
- Petit Gascon Saintongeois
- Plott Hound
- Poitevin
- Polish Hound (pl. Ogar Polski)
- Polish Hunting Dog (pl. Gończy Polski)
- Porcelaine
- Posavac Hound
- Rache (obsolete term)
- Sabueso Español (Spanish Scenthound)
- Sabueso fino Colombiano
- St. Hubert Jura Hound
- Schillerstövare
- Segugio dell'Appennino
- Segugio Italiano a Pelo Forte
- Segugio Italiano a Pelo Raso
- Segugio Maremmano
- Serbian Hound
- Serbian Tricolour Hound
- Schweizer Laufhund
- Schweizerischer Niederlaufhund
- Slovenský Kopov (Slovakian Hound)
- Smålandsstövare
- Southern Hound (extinct)
- Stephens Cur
- Styrian Coarse-haired Hound
- Talbot Hound (extinct)
- Tatranský durič
- Transylvanian Hound
- Treeing Cur
- Treeing Tennessee Brindle
- Trigg Hound
- Tyrolean Hound
- Valdueza
- West Country Harrier
- Westphalian Dachsbracke

== United Kennel Club (US) Scenthound Group ==
The Scenthound Group is the group category used by the United Kennel Club (US), which it divides into two categories. The first includes the American hunting dogs known as coonhounds and the European hounds from which they were developed. These are referred to as Tree Hounds. The category also includes curs, American dogs bred for hunting a variety of game, such as squirrels, raccoons, opossums, bobcats, cougars, American black bears, and feral pigs. The second category is referred to as Trailing Scenthounds, and includes dogs used for tracking of humans, reputedly descended from the St. Hubert Hounds.
