= Istrian Hound =

Istrian Hound can refer to:

- Istrian Coarse-haired Hound
- Istrian Shorthaired Hound
