= Wire-haired =

Wire-haired may refer to a number of dog breeds with a harsh, wiry coat:

- German Wirehaired Pointer
- Istrian Coarse-haired Hound, also known as the Wirehaired Istrian Hound
- Styrian Coarse-haired Hound, also known as the Wirehair Styrian Mountain
- Wire Fox Terrier
- Wire-haired Dachshund
- Wirehaired Pointing Griffon
- Wirehaired Vizsla
