= Styrian Coarse-haired Hound =

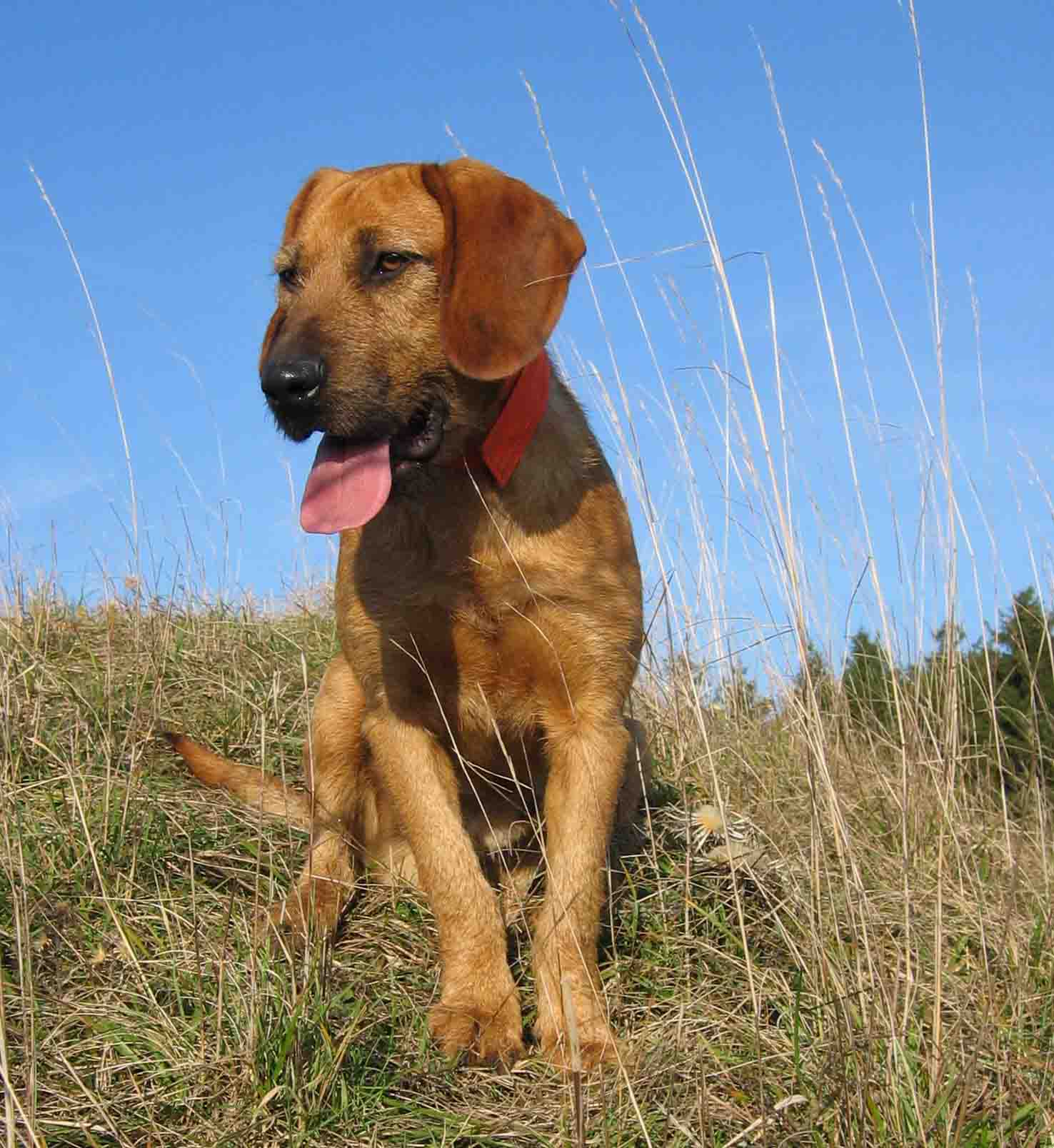
- Other names: Steirische Rauhhaarbracke, Peintinger Bracke, Steirische Rauhhaarige Hochgebirgsbracke, Wirehair Styrian Mountain
- Origin: Austria
Kennel club standards
- Fédération Cynologique Internationale: standard

The Styrian Coarse-haired Hound (German: Steirische Rauhhaarbracke) is a breed of medium-sized hound dog originated in the Austrian province of Styria. It is bred as a scenthound, for hunting boar in mountainous terrain. The breed is one of the large Austrian Bracke.

== Appearance ==
The Styrian Coarse-haired Hound is a medium-sized hound, with height at the withers of 45–53 cm (17.5–21 in), and weight between 15–18 kg (33-40 lbs) with a well muscled body and a serious expression.

The breed name refers to the coat, which is harsh and rough (although not shaggy). Coat colours are red and fawn; a white mark on the chest may be present. The breed tolerates extremes of temperature well, and has remained a healthy breed through "refresher breeding" (Auffrischungszucht, outcrossing).

== History ==
The breed was created in the 1870s by Karl Peintinger, an industrialist from Styria. Peintinger crossed his "Hela 1", from an old type of Hanoverian scent hound, with an Istrian Hound, and continued selective breeding until a rough-coated, hardy hunting dog was achieved. The breed is used by Austrians and Slovenians to hunt wild boar. It can also be used to track wounded animals through rough terrain and in high altitudes.

As with many breeds bred for work, they are not generally kept as a companion dog and do not make good pets; they require a lot of space and exercise, and can be dominant and destructive.

== Recognition ==
The Styrian Coarse-haired Hound is sometimes called the Peintinger Bracke after the creator of the breed in the 1870s. The breed was first recognised in 1889. It is recognised in its home country by the Österreichische Kynologenverband (Austrian Kennel Club) and internationally by the Fédération Cynologique Internationale as a medium-sized scenthound, breed number 62. The breed is also recognised in North America by the United Kennel Club in the Scenthound Group. In Austria, breeding is overseen and hunt testing done by the Österreichischer Verein Brack (hunt club). The breed may also be listed by various minor kennel clubs and organisations under its original name, the English translation, alternate names, or various combinations of those, and promoted as a rare breed for those seeking an unusual pet.

== Related breeds ==
The Brandlbracke (Australian Short Haired Bracke, or Vieräugl) (FCI 63), and the Tiroler Bracke (FCI 68) are short-haired breeds of large Austrian Bracke, descended from the same ancient types of hounds.

== See also ==
- List of dog breeds
- Scenthound Group
- History of Styria
