= Smaland Hound =

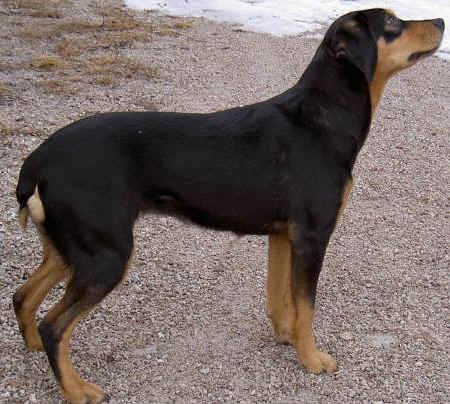
- Other names: Smålandsstövare
- Origin: Sweden
Traits
Height	Males	18–21 inches (46–53 cm)
	Females	17–20 inches (43–51 cm)
- Color: Black and tan, with or without small white markings on the chest and toes.
Kennel club standards
- Fédération Cynologique Internationale: standard

Smaland Hound (Swedish: Smålandsstövare) is a breed of dog that originated in Sweden in the 16th century. Thought to be the oldest scent hound breed native to Sweden, it was first recognized by the Swedish Kennel Club in 1921. They are the smallest of the Swedish hound breeds, and have black and tan markings similar to the rottweiler. Internationally, it is recognized by a number of kennel clubs and registries including the Fédération Cynologique Internationale and United Kennel Club. It is considered rare, even in its native Sweden where only around sixty puppies are registered each year.

== History ==
The breed has existed in Sweden since the 16th century. The name originated from the breed's links with Småland in southern Sweden. During the time of the Swedish Empire a number of wars were fought, with soldiers returning to their native country bringing a variety of hound breeds with them. These hounds were bred with local spitz type dogs, and the offspring became the foundation stock of the modern Smålandsstövare.

Farmers in Sweden preferred an all around hunting dog as they could often only afford to feed a single hunting dog, and so the breed became adept at hunting a number of quarry including hares, squirrels and foxes as well as birds and larger game such as elk. During this initial period the Smålandsstövare came in a variety of colors, sizes and lengths of tail with selective breeding not being put into practice until the 19th century. At the first dog show held in Sweden, in 1889, 444 dogs were entered, of which 189 were hound type dogs, including a number of Smålandsstövares. In the early 20th century, breeders worked to restore the breed to the old type, with a naturally occurring short tail.

The breed was first recognized by the Swedish Kennel Club in 1921, the same year that the first breed standard was drawn up. The first of the breed to be registered was Skoj av Myren 789 V, owned by Mary Stephens from the Torne valley. At the time of the first standard, both long and short tails were allowed under the regulations. Baron Frederik von Essen is responsible for breeding short tailed Smålandsstövares, which was to become a trait of the entire breed after they were initially developed in Jönköping County. The most recent standard was drawn up in 1952, around the same time as other dogs of a similar type were used to inject new blood into the breed. This was the most recent time that dogs with an unknown background were allowed to be registered as a Smålandsstövare. Currently on average around sixty puppies a year are registered with the Swedish Kennel Club, and the breed is therefore considered rare. They are not normally seen outside of Sweden.

Outside of Sweden, it is recognized by the American Rare Breed Association, Continental Kennel Club, and the Fédération Cynologique Internationale. The United Kennel Club recognized the breed as the Smaland Hound in 2006.

== Description ==
Often confused with the Rottweiler breed due to common coat coloring, the Smålandsstövare is the oldest scent hound breed native to Sweden. They have a medium length top coat with a shorter, dense undercoat; longer hair grows on the fringed tail and thighs. The most common coloring of the breed is a mostly black coat with tan markings, although the markings can range in color from shades of amber to a reddish brown.

They have a tough, robust body which is compact and almost square in shape. It is the smallest of the Swedish hounds, on average they measure between 16–21 inches (41–53 cm) at the withers with males being slightly larger than females. Average weight is around 33–44 pounds (15–20 kg) for both genders. The Smålandsstövare has a natural bobtail due to this being specifically bred into the breed, and a typical member of the breed should be well muscled in proportion throughout.

The facial features include wide nostrils on a black nose, the jaw closes in a scissors bite and the eyes are typically dark brown. The skull itself is lean with a well defined stop. The ears have rounded tips, and are set fairly high on the skull, hanging flat down the sides.

== Temperament ==
A popular Swedish hunting dog, members of the breed can form strong attachments to their master; but are also seen as household pets due to their gentle and protective nature. In hunting, they are used to drive the quarry for the hunter. They are a highly intelligent breed, and require a high level of exercise. They therefore are not best suited to living in a small apartment. Smålandsstövare are wary of strangers and can be territorial, but this can also make a Smålandsstövare a good watchdog. Participation in field trials for Smålandsstövares are becoming increasingly common. They remain active up until around twelve years old.

== Health ==
The Swedish breed club for the Smålandsstövare commissioned genetic tests on a number of dogs between 1994 and 2008. The tests showed that there were no specific health issues unique to the breed, nor any major generic issues. They recommended that where rare health issues present themselves, that the dog involved should not be bred from in order to prevent that health issue from spreading through the breed. They have an average life expectancy of twelve to fifteen years.

== See also ==
- List of dog breeds
