= Hamiltonstövare =

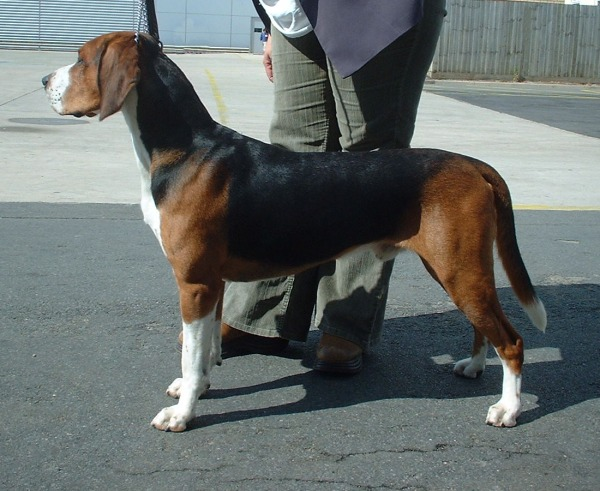
- Male Hamiltonstövare
- Other names: Hamilton Hound, Swedish Foxhound
- Common nicknames: Hamilton
- Origin: Sweden
Traits
Height	Males	53–61 cm (21–24 in)
	Females	49–57 cm (19–22 in)
- Coat: Short, close and soft undercoat, especially thick during winter. Outer coat strongly weather resistant lying close to body.
- Colour: Tri-colour
Kennel club standards
- Fédération Cynologique Internationale: standard

The Hamiltonstövare (or Hamilton Hound) is a breed of scenthound originally developed by the founder of the Swedish Kennel Club, Count Adolf Hamilton. Its ancestors include several German hounds as well as English Foxhounds and Harriers. The breed is recognized by the Swedish Kennel Club, Federation Cynologique Internationale (FCI) and the American Kennel Club's Foundational Stock Service.

== Appearance ==
=== Characteristics ===
The Hamiltonstövare is a medium-sized dog with a well-balanced and muscular frame. It has a short, dense coat that is tri-colored, typically featuring a combination of black, tan, and white markings. The breed's distinctive appearance, coupled with its elegant gait, reflects both its functional capabilities and aesthetic appeal. Male dogs should be between 53–61 centimetres (21–24 in) and females between 49–57 centimetres (19–22 in) tall. Generally they weigh between 23–27 kilograms (51–60 lb).

=== Temperament ===
Known for its keen sense of smell and hunting skills, the Hamiltonstövare is bred for hunting hare and fox, especially in tracking scents alone over the varied Swedish terrains, including dense forests, open fields, or rugged mountains. The Hamiltonstövare's acute sense of smell allows it to excel in most hunting tasks; however, they have been bred to refuse to track deer.

The Hamiltonstövare is friendly and has a sociable nature. While it possesses a strong hunting instinct, it is also a loyal and affectionate companion. The breed tends to form strong bonds with its family members and is generally good with children. However, the breed can be stubborn.

== History ==
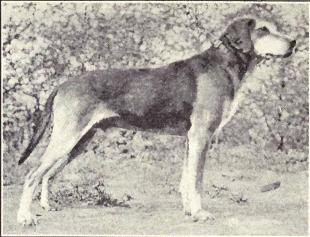
Hamiltonstövare from 1915

The use of scenthounds in Sweden dates back at least to the 1500s when it is thought that Eastern European hounds were brought to Scandinavia. There is some disagreement as to the ancestors of the Hamiltonstövare, and various authorities have proposed native Swedish hounds, Swiss and German hounds such as the Holstein hound or the Hanover hound, Latvia's now extinct Curland hound, the English foxhound and harrier. In the late 19th century, Count Adolf Patrick Hamilton, a Swedish cavalry officer and the Swedish Kennel Club's first president, dedicated his efforts to developing a breed that would excel in hunting and tracking and at an 1886 dog show, he presented two dogs which would be considered the first Hamiltonstövare. The result was a dog with a robust build, well-suited for navigating the diverse terrains of the Swedish countryside. While a popular hound in Sweden, the breed is rare outside of Scandinavia. Originally simply called the Swedish hound, like the Schillerstövare and the Hygen hund, the breed was later renamed Hamiltonstövare after its creator in 1921 when it was recognized by the Swedish Kennel Club in 1921. The Federation Cynologique Internationale (FCI) recognized the Hamiltonstövare in 1955, and the breed is currently part of the American Kennel Club's Foundational Stock Service.

== Popular culture ==
According to Swedish folklore, the elf Tomten is assisted by a Hamiltonstövare named Karo.

== See also ==
- List of dog breeds
