= Slovenský kopov =

Slovenský Kopov Slovak Hound
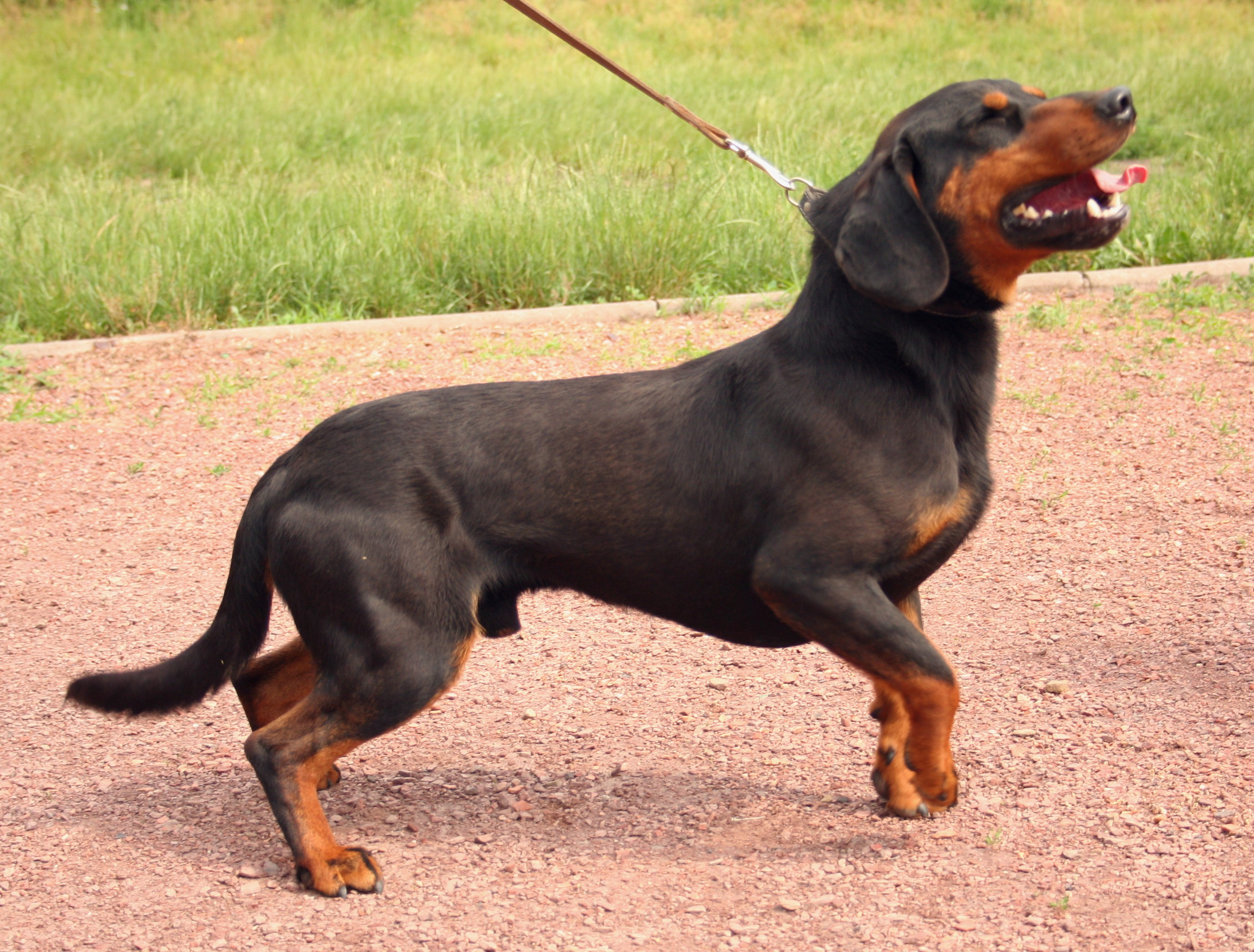
- Slovenský Kopov/Slovakian Hound
- Other names: Slovak Hound, Black Forest Hound
- Origin: Slovakia
Traits
- Color: Black and tan
Kennel club standards
- Fédération Cynologique Internationale: standard

The Slovenský Kopov (translated into English as Slovakian Hound) is a medium-sized breed of hunting dog of the scenthound type. The breed originated in Slovakia, in Central Europe, and is bred for deer tracking and boar hunting. The name Black Forest Hound seems to have been created in North America for marketing purposes, since the breed has no connection with the Black Forest. The German name for this breed is Schwarzwildbracke which translates to Wild Boar Hound and not Schwarzwaldbracke which would be Black Forest Hound.

The Slovenský Kopov is fairly rare in North America with only one known breeder, Alan Adams with A&M Kennels. It is most commonly used for feral hog hunting and wounded game recovery. The breed makes an exceptional house pet with its laid back demeanor. It is good with children and easy to train. It tends to become protective of the property and of family members but are not known to be an aggressive breed. Unlike a typical hound, it is not vocal unless a stranger comes onto its owner's property or at a carcass find. As to their tracking abilities, the Slovaks cut no corners in only breeding proven stock and culling all others. Its tracking abilities are some of the best in the world for deer and hogs.

== Appearance ==
The Slovenský Kopov or Slovakian Hound is a typical hunting hound in appearance, with a muscular body, long legs, a long tail, and long drop ears. The short coat is always black in colour, with tan markings (black and tan). Dogs should be around 16 kg (35 lbs) in weight and 46 cm (18 ins) at the withers, with bitches somewhat smaller. Ideal size is described in the breed standard to discourage the breeding of overly large or excessively small dogs. Other measurements for the ideal hound are given in the Standard, in order to preserve breed type. The breed is more heavily built than the similarly marked American Black and Tan Coonhound, but is more lightly built than the otherwise similar Ogar Polski, the more strongly built hound from Poland. The eyes are always dark, deep-set, and have a look of liveliness and courage.

== Temperament ==
The Slovenský Kopov is an intelligent and independent hunting dog known for its persistence and well-developed sense of direction.

== History and use ==
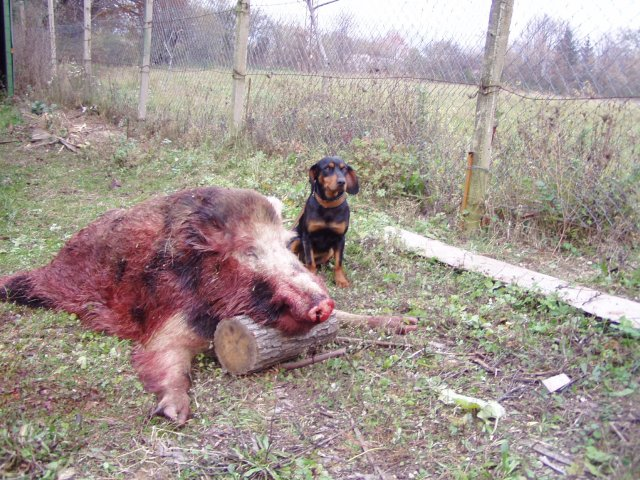
A wild boar and Slovenský Kopov, for size comparison

A well-known type of hunting dog since antiquity, today's breed was first recognised in the 1870s. The breeds of Brandlbracke (Austrian Black and Tan Hound), Chart Polski (Polish Greyhound), and Magyar Agár (Hungarian Greyhound) are believed to have been used in the breed's background. The etymology of the name seems to refer to the dog's colour. The breed club was established in Bratislava in 1988.

The Slovenský Kopov was developed and is used as a hunting dog, not a pet or showdog. It is bred for hunting large game, especially wild boar. Although extremely common in its area of origin, it is rarely seen in other countries. The Slovenský Kopov is similar to other East European scenthounds in appearance and hunting style.

== Recognition ==
The breed is recognised in its country of origin with the name Slovenský Kopov, and is listed for international dog sports competition with the Fédération Cynologique Internationale under that name as breed number 244, in Group 6, Scenthounds and Related Breeds, Section 1.2 Medium-sized Hounds. Exported to North America, the breed is recognised under the English translation of its name, the Slovakian Hound, by the United Kennel Club in the United States. The breed also may be registered under a variety of translations of the name, or created English names such as the Wild Boar Hound (from the German Schwarzwildbracke), with minor kennel clubs, hunting clubs, and internet dog registry businesses, and promoted as a rare breed for those seeking an unusual hunting dog or a unique pet.

== See also ==
- List of dog breeds
- Hound
- Scenthound
