= Ariégeois =

French breed of dog

Ariegeois
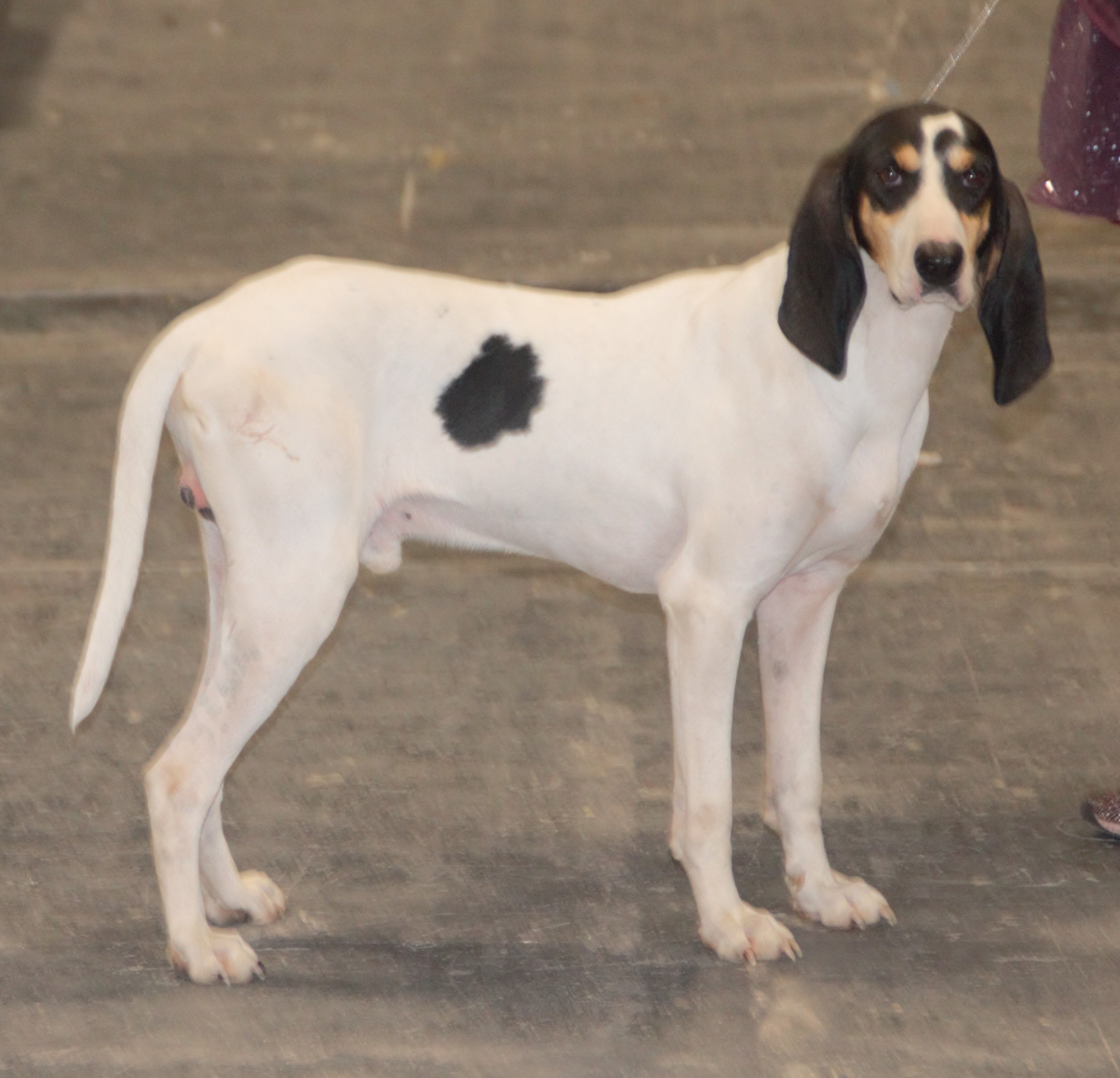

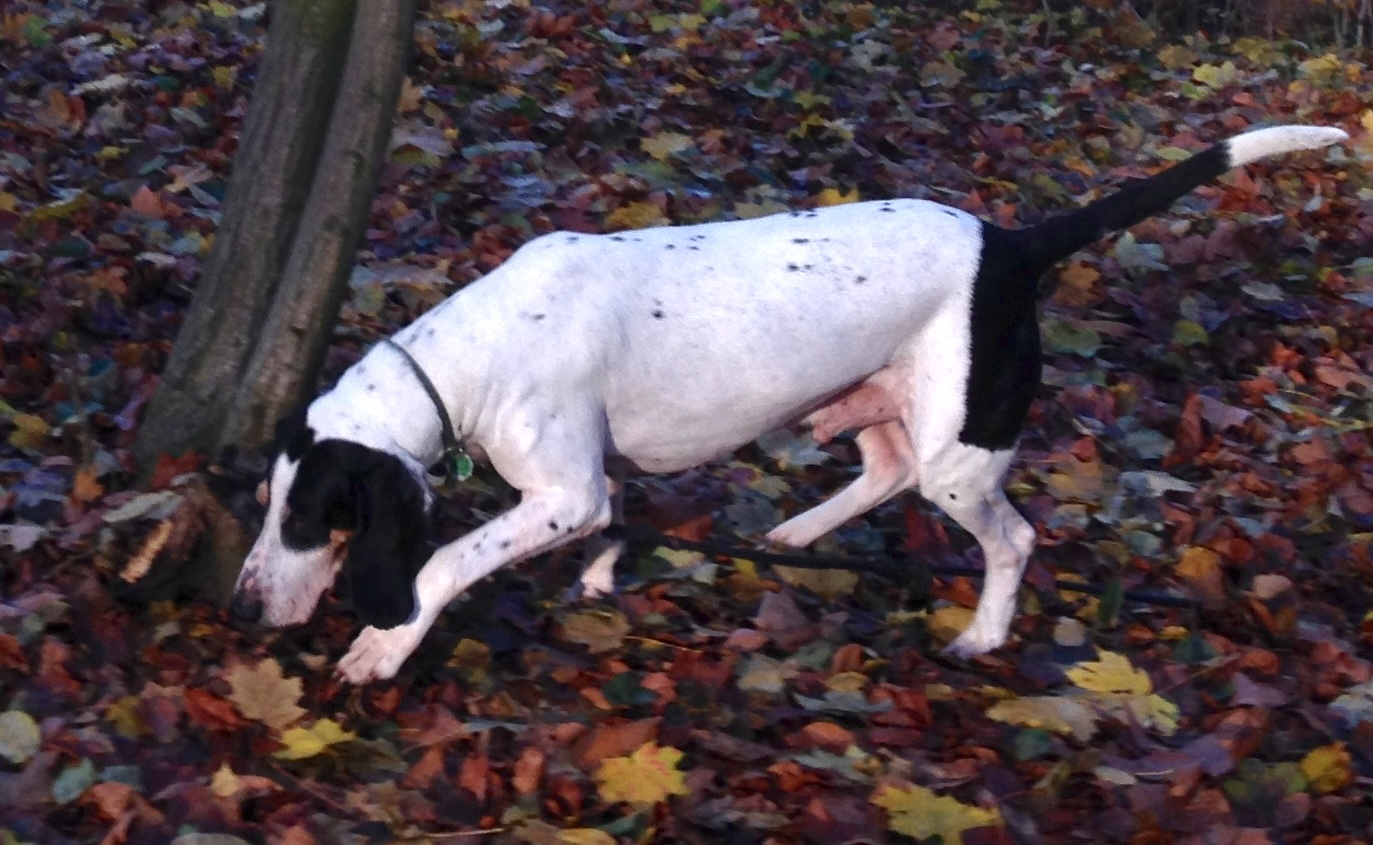
- Other names: Ariege Hound
- Origin: France
- Distribution: Midi-Pyrenées
Traits
Height	Males	52–58 cm (20–23 in)
	Females	50–56 cm (20–22 in)
- Weight: 25–27 kg (55–60 lb)
- Coat: short, fine and dense
- Colour: white or mottled white, with black patches and tan markings
Kennel club standards
- Société Centrale Canine: standard
- Fédération Cynologique Internationale: standard

The Ariégeois is a French breed of medium-sized scent hound from the département of Ariège in the Midi-Pyrenées region of southern France. It may have derived from cross-breeding of pack-hunting hounds such as the Grand Bleu de Gascogne or Grand Gascon-Saintongeois with local Briquet dogs. It hunts either alone or in a pack, and is used both as a courser and for driving game to waiting guns. While most successful with hares, it is also used for hunting deer and boar. It does not adapt well to urban life, and is not usually kept as a companion dog.

== History ==
The Ariégeois is a traditional breed of the Midi-Pyrenées, and particularly of the Ariège. It may have derived from cross-breeding of pack-hunting hounds such as the Grand Bleu de Gascogne or Grand Gascon-Saintongeois with local Briquet dogs. It was officially recognised in France in 1912, and was definitively accepted by the Fédération Cynologique Internationale in 1954.

== Characteristics ==
The Ariégeois is similar in appearance to the Grand Bleu de Gascogne and Grand Gascon-Saintongeois, but is lighter in build and not as tall. The usual weight is approximately 25–27 kg. Dogs stand some 52 to 58 cm, bitches about two centimetres less. The skin is close-fitting and without wrinkles; the mucosa are black. The coat is dense, smooth and short. It is white or mottled white, with clear-edged patches of black; there are tan markings to the face, and tan points over the eyes. The ears are soft and just long enough to reach the nose. The neck is slender and arched slightly. The feet are of long oval shape, like those of a hare, with black pads and claws; there are no dewclaws. The tail is slightly curved.

== Use ==
The Ariégeois is a scent hound. It may hunt either alone or in a pack, and is used both as a courser and for driving game to waiting guns. While most successful with hares, it is also used to track deer and wild boar. It is light and tough, and can work on difficult terrain and in even the thickest brush, but is not particularly fast. It bays while tracking.

It does not adapt well to urban life, and is not usually kept as a companion dog.
