= Briquet Griffon Vendéen =

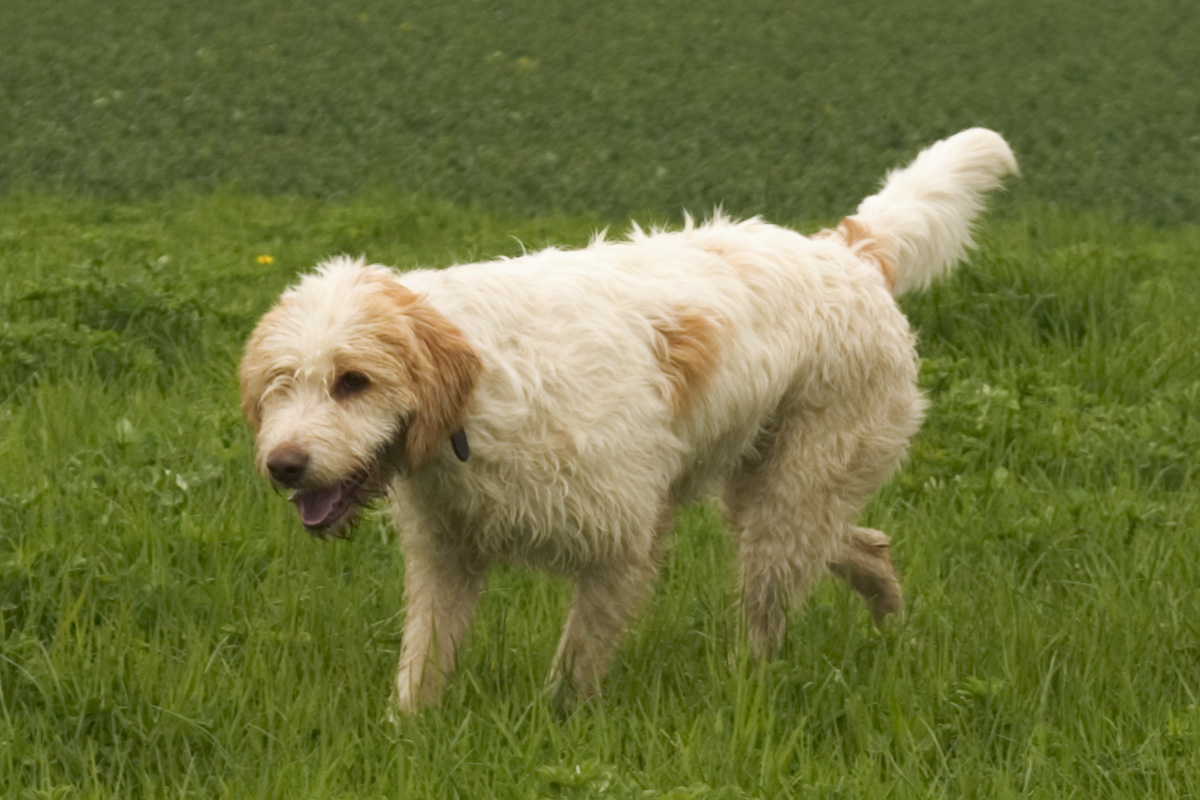
- Male Briquet Griffon Vendéen
- Other names: Medium Vendéen Griffon
- Origin: France
Traits
Height	Males	50–55 cm (20–22 in)
	Females	48–53 cm (19–21 in)
- Coat: Long
- Color: White and black, white and orange, black and tan, tricolor
Kennel club standards
- Société Centrale Canine: standard
- Fédération Cynologique Internationale: standard

A Briquet Griffon Vendéen is a medium-sized griffon scenthound originating in Vendeé, France. The Briquet Griffon Vendéen was recognized by the FCI in 1954.

== History ==
Prior to World War I, it was bred down in size by the Comte d’Elva from the Grand Griffon Vendéen. The name Briquet means "medium-sized dog" in French. The Briquet Griffon Vendéen was almost extinct after World War II, but thanks to the effort of Hubert Dezamy, a French dog show judge, the breed was restored.

== Appearance ==
The Briquet Griffon Vendéen has a short head, low-set ears and a rough double coat. It comes in solid or mixed colors, fawn, light brown, white and orange, white and gray and even tri-colored. Males are 50–55 centimetres (20–22 in) in height, females are 48–53 centimetres (19–21 in).

=== Temperament ===
The Briquet is a breed bred to hunt, with many being able to pick up a cold trail in addition to a hot one. Like other vendèen hounds, the Briquet relishes time outdoors. While they are not high-strung, they are lively and enthusiastic dogs. Bred to work in packs as well as on their own, they get along well with other dogs and are generally not overly possessive. They are often seen as good companions for children.

Griffons do not particularly take to being told what to do. They do not mind being cajoled, bribed, or played with - and if these things lead them to do something their owner likes, then everyone is happy.

== Exercise ==
Bred to hunt large game, Briquet Griffon Vendéen usually worked as a small pack.

== See also ==
- List of dog breeds
