= Estonian Hound =

Dog breed developed in Estonia

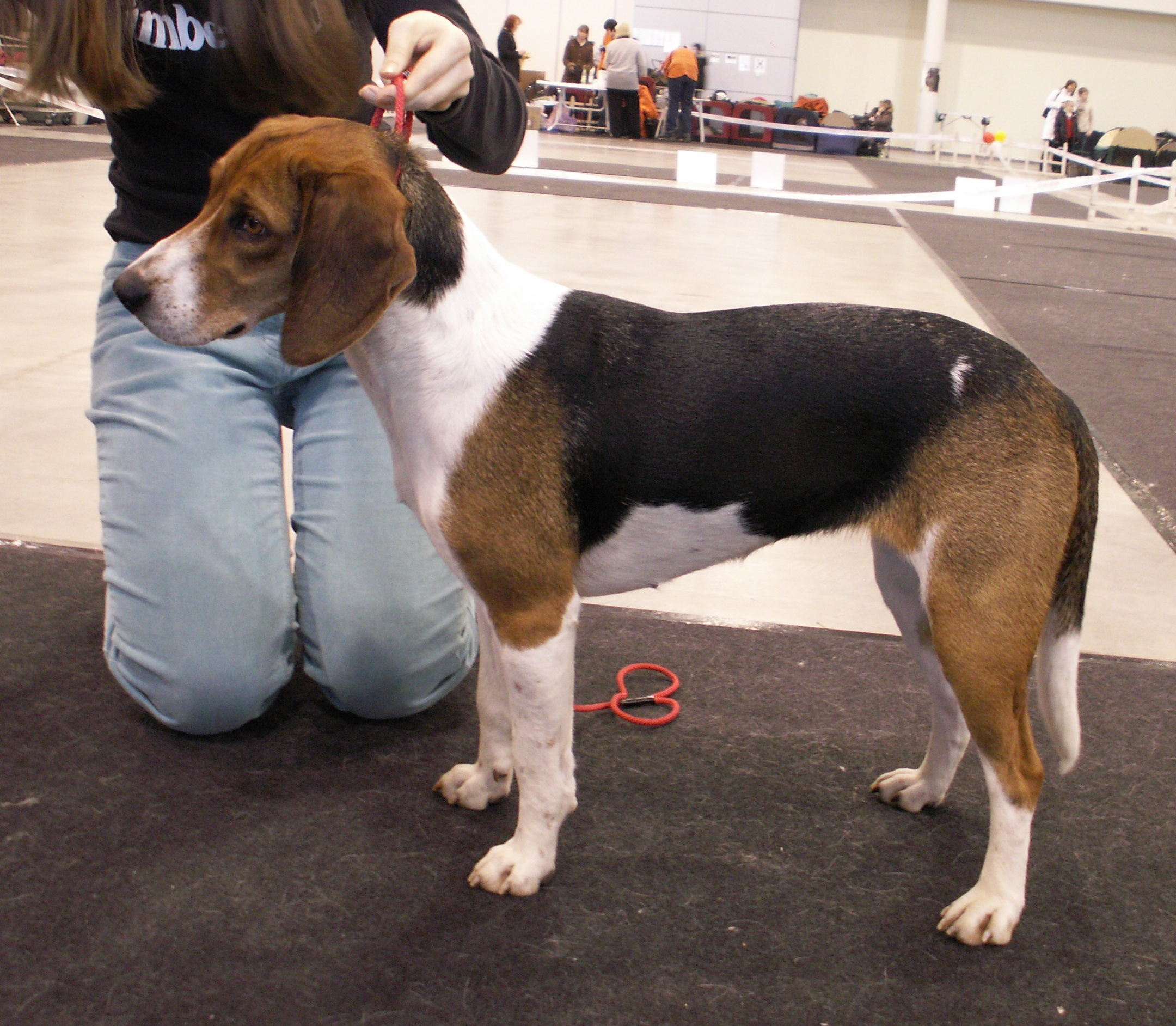
- An Estonian Hound.
- Other names: eesti hagijas, chien courant d'Estonie, Estnische Bracke, sabueso de Estonia
- Origin: Estonia
Traits
Height	Males	45–52 cm (18–20 in)
	Females	42–49 cm (17–19 in)
- Coat: short, smooth, shiny
- Colour: tricolor (white with black and red markings), bicolor (white and yellow or white and red)
Kennel club standards
- Fédération Cynologique Internationale: standard

The Estonian Hound (Estonian: eesti hagijas) is a scent hound-like breed, with the distinction of being the only dog breed developed in Estonia. It was bred in 1947 when the Soviet Union's national economy ministry decided that every country in the Union must have its own breed. In September 2019, the FCI officially recognized the breed.

== History ==
The Estonian Hound resulted from the crossbreeding of several foreign dog breeds with local hunting dogs. The Estonian Hound's development was announced by an ultimatum issued by the Soviet Union’s Ministry of Agriculture and Economy in 1947, which ordered every Soviet Republic to establish a local breed of hunting dogs to replace the large breeds of hunting dogs bred at that moment. These large dogs were blamed for the rapid decline of Estonia's wildlife population; it was established that only dogs with a maximum height of 17 inches were allowed to hunt. The result was a very agile and hard-driven breed that has enjoyed tremendous popularity since then: the modern Estonian Hound. After Estonia regained its independence, the Estonian Hound was proclaimed the country's national dog.

== Description ==
The Estonian Hound is a dog of medium size and a strong muscular body, bone structure, and well-developed muscles. It has no folds in its skin, and drop ears. The coat is short and rough and should be shiny. The undercoat is weakly developed. This breed's eyes are dark brown colored. The Estonian Hound usually has black patches and a dark pigmented skin. The size of the patches is unlimited. Blackish-brown color, red patches and a saddle like patches on the back are also allowed, but the tip of the tail has to be white. The Estonian Hound's height is 17–21 inches (43–53 cm) and it weighs 33–44 pounds (15–20 kg).

=== Temperament ===
The Estonian Hound is happy and pleasant dog with a balanced, calm and active temperament and a high intelligence. It is friendly and should never be aggressive, so it needs to be socialized and exposed to new situations and environments in order to prevent it from being a bit timid. It is good with other dogs and usually also with cats if used to them as a puppy. They love human attention and can get upset when left alone. Proper human to canine communication is really important to its training. They are affectionate and easy to teach; this is important since they have to learn that they cannot hunt hoofed animals in Estonia, where only hare and foxes are allowed to be hunted. The Estonian Hound has a pleasant voice that doesn't annoy when it hunts.

== See also ==
- List of dog breeds
