= Beagle-Harrier =

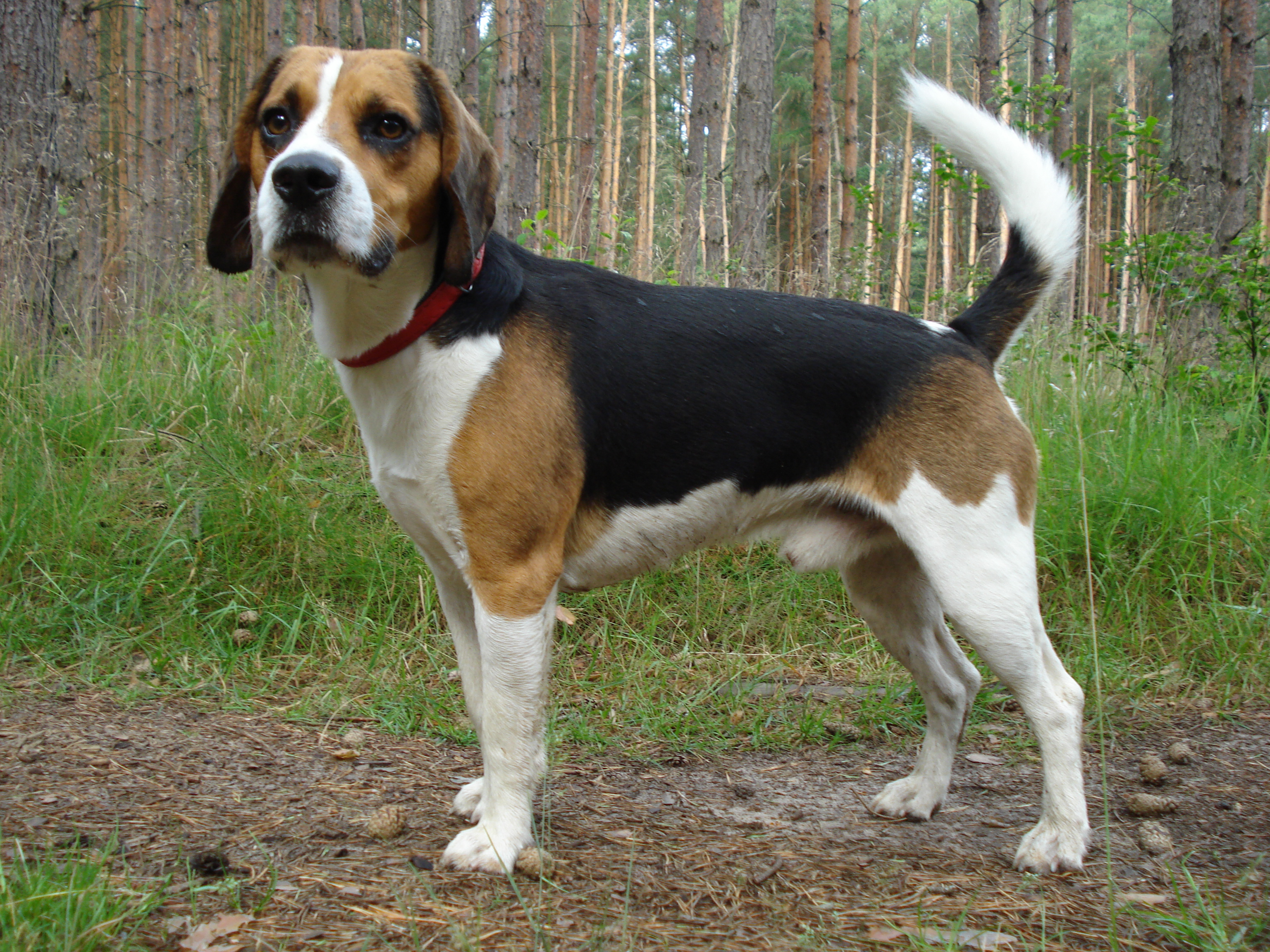
- Beagle-Harrier
- Origin: France
Traits
- Height: 45–50 cm (18–20 in)
- Coat: Thick, not too short, and flat.
- Colour: fawn, black and white
Kennel club standards
- Société Centrale Canine: standard
- Fédération Cynologique Internationale: standard

The Beagle-Harrier is a breed of dog originating from France. It is a scenthound, originally bred to hunt hares.

== Characteristics ==
=== Appearance ===
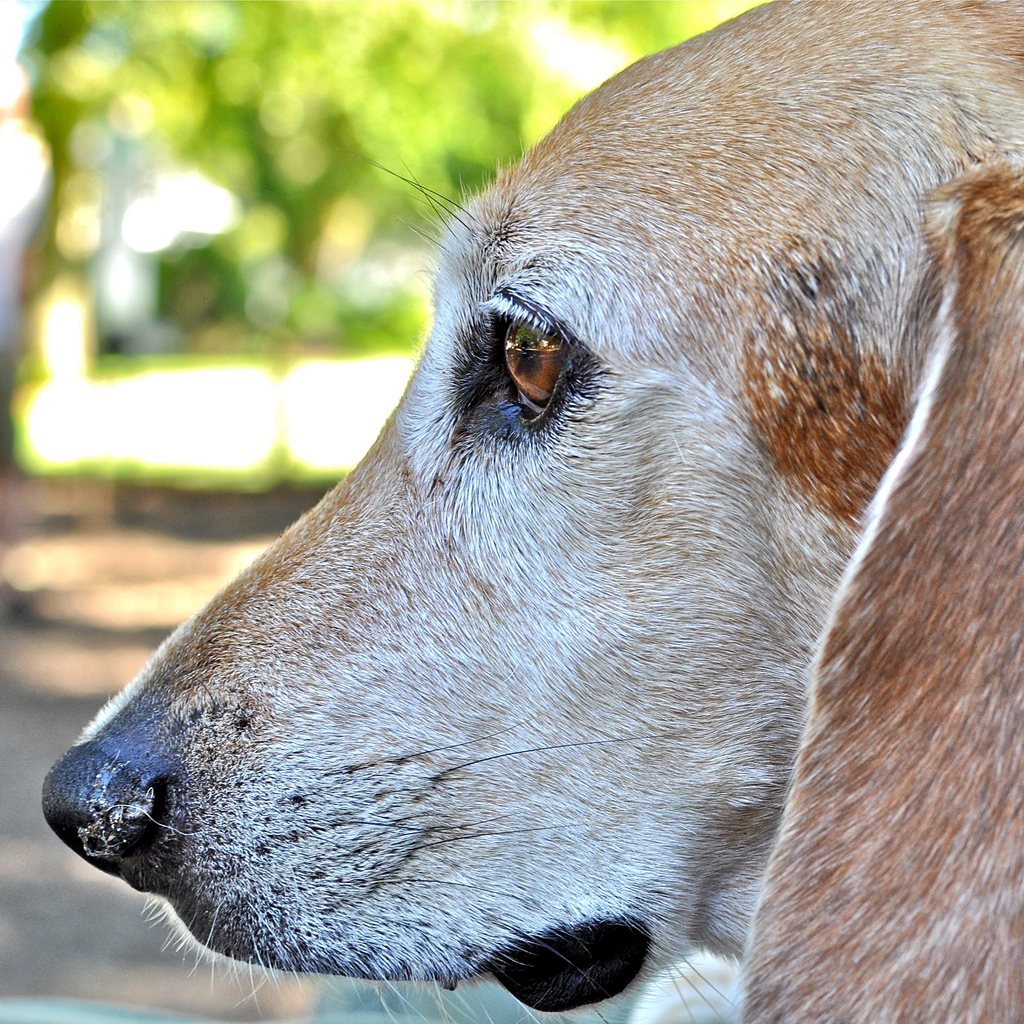
Head profile of a Beagle-Harrier.

The Beagle-Harrier appears to be either a large Beagle or a small Harrier. It is a medium-sized dog, between 45 and 50 centimeters (18 and 20 inches) tall at the withers, and it weighs between 19 and 21 kilograms (42 and 46 pounds). Its coat is usually tricolor, featuring the colors fawn, black, tan, or white. There are also grey-coated (tricolor) Beagle-Harriers. The Beagle-Harrier's body is usually muscular and its coat smooth and thick.

== Health ==
The Beagle Harrier is generally healthy and has a life span of 12 to 13 years. The breed can be prone to Hip dysplasia due to being a long-backed breed of dog.

== History ==
Beagle-Harriers were bred in France in the late 19th century by Baron Gerard, as a cross between the Beagle and the Harrier. Like its parent breeds, the Beagle-Harrier was bred to hunt hares, and is now a pack hunter used for hares, deer, and other game. The Beagle-Harrier was later imported into America in the mid-1800s to hunt rabbits. It was recognized by the FCI in 1974. Especially outside of its native France, the breed is quite rare.

== See also ==
- List of dog breeds
- Beagle
- Harrier
