= Barak hound =

Barak
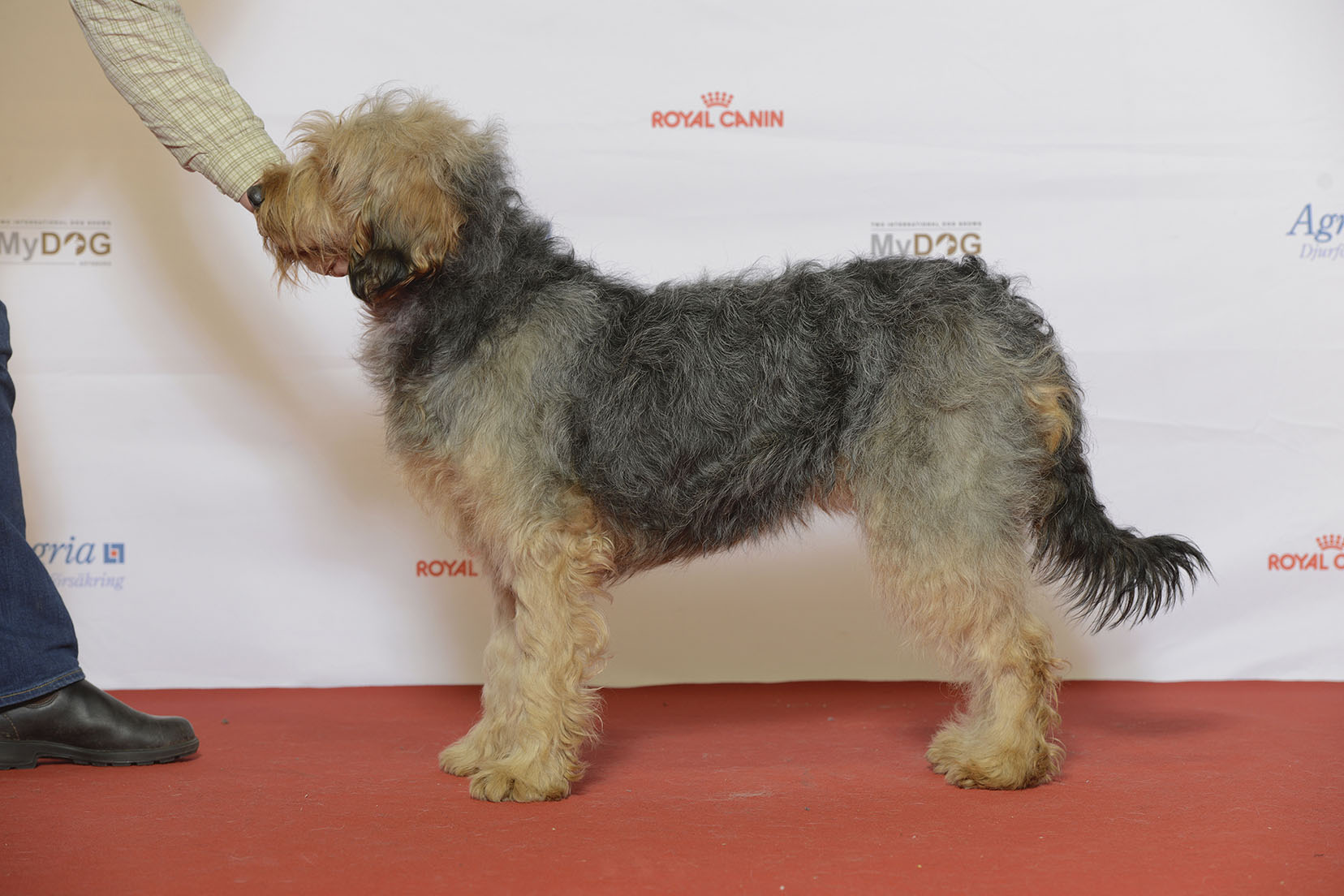
- Barak hound
- Other names: Bosnian Broken-haired Hound; Bosanski oštrodlaki gonič; Bosnian Rough-haired Hound; Bosnian Rough-coated Hound; Bosnian Coarse-haired Hound; Bosnian Hound
- Origin: Bosnia and Herzegovina
Traits
Height	Males	46–56 cm (18–22 in)
	Females	A little smaller than the males
- Weight: 16–27 kg (35–60 lb)
- Coat: Long and shaggy with a dense undercoat
- Colour: wheaten yellow, reddish yellow, earthy grey, or blackish.
Kennel club standards
- Fédération Cynologique Internationale: standard

The Barak or Bosnian Broken-haired Hound (Bosnian, Serbo-Croatian: bosanski oštrodlaki gonič / босански оштродлаки гонич), is a hunting dog breed developed in Bosnia. The breed is a scenthound, originally used to hunt large game. Other names include Bosnian Rough-haired Hound and Bosnian Rough-coated Hound. These names refer to the texture of the shaggy coat, usually called broken-haired or hard in English dog fancier jargon.

== History ==
Today's breed is descended from indigenous dog types, crossed with an Italian gun dog in the 1890s. "Local hunters, wanting to produce an efficient scent hound, developed this breed in the nineteenth century, using the available stock of dogs." The early type of today's smaller Istrian Shorthaired Hound may also have contributed to the Bosnian Coarse-haired Hound.

The Bosnian Coarse-haired Hound was first recognised by the Fédération Cynologique Internationale in 1965 under the name of "Illyrian Hound". The name was changed to more accurately describe its area of origin in Bosnia. The breed is in Group 6, Scenthounds, Section 1.1 Large-sized Hounds, and is breed number 155. It is also recognised by the United Kennel Club (US) as the "Barak", in the Scenthound Group. The breed is not recognised by any other major kennel clubs in the English speaking world, although many minor kennel clubs, internet dog registry businesses, and rare breed registries promote and register it as a unique pet.

A genetic analysis found that modern Barak dogs have high genetic diversity and are most closely related to the Tornjak.

== Description ==
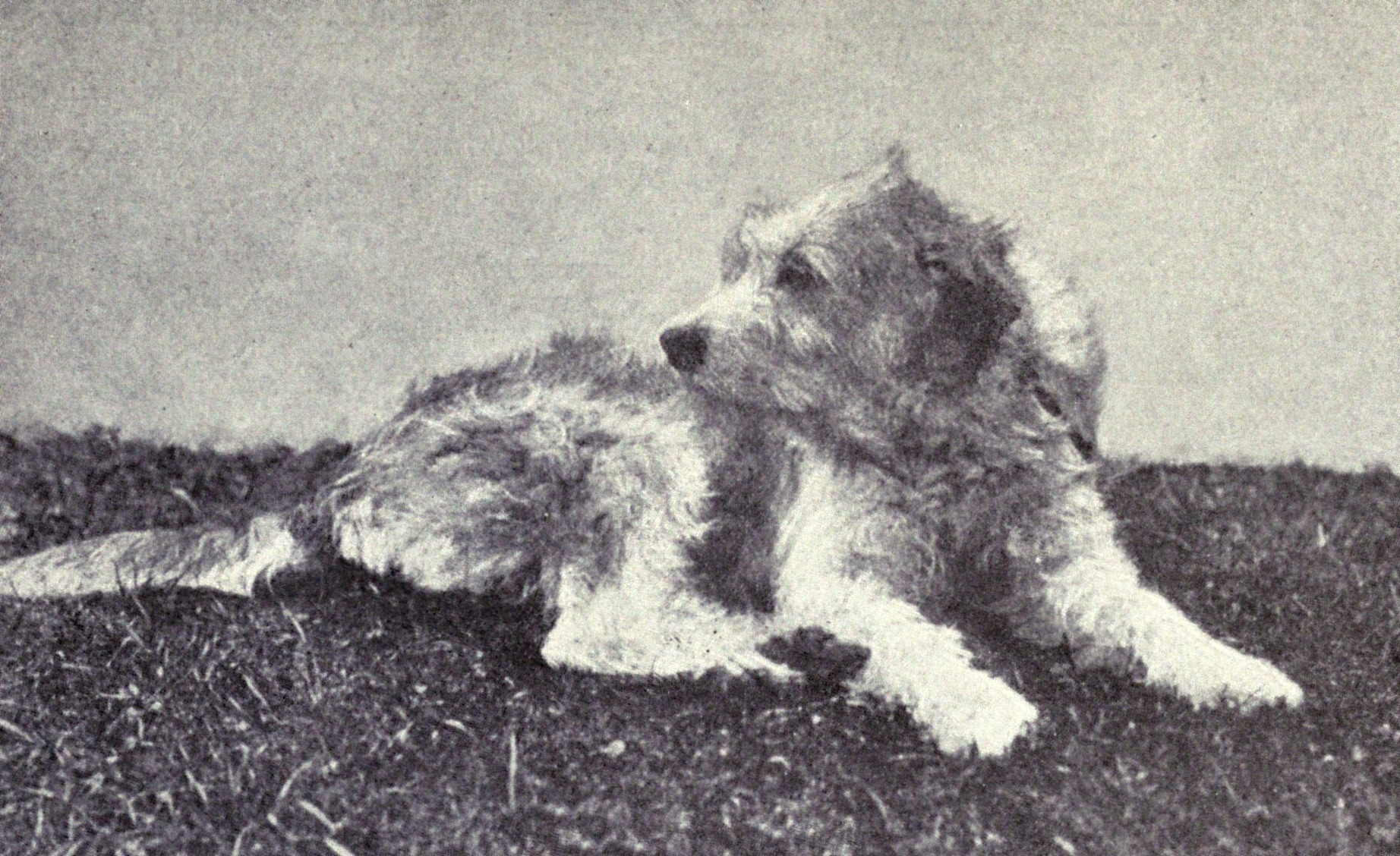
A Bosnian Coarse-haired Hound from 1915.

=== Appearance ===
The most striking feature of the Bosnian Coarse-haired Hound is its shaggy, hard coat of yellowish (wheaten or red) or greyish colours, often with a white blaze on its head along with other white marks. The standard calls for a body length ten percent greater than height; these proportions are given to differentiate the Bosnian Coarse-haired Hound from other hounds of the area which are "a bit low on leg". Height ranges from 43–55 cm (17–21.5 in) at the withers, and weight is between 16–27 kg (35–60 lb). The dog normally carries its tail curved slightly upward, and its face has a bushy moustache and beard.

=== Temperament ===
The breed standard describes its behaviour as lively, as well as courageous and persistent.

== See also ==
- List of dog breeds
