= Tatra Hound =

Slovak dog breed

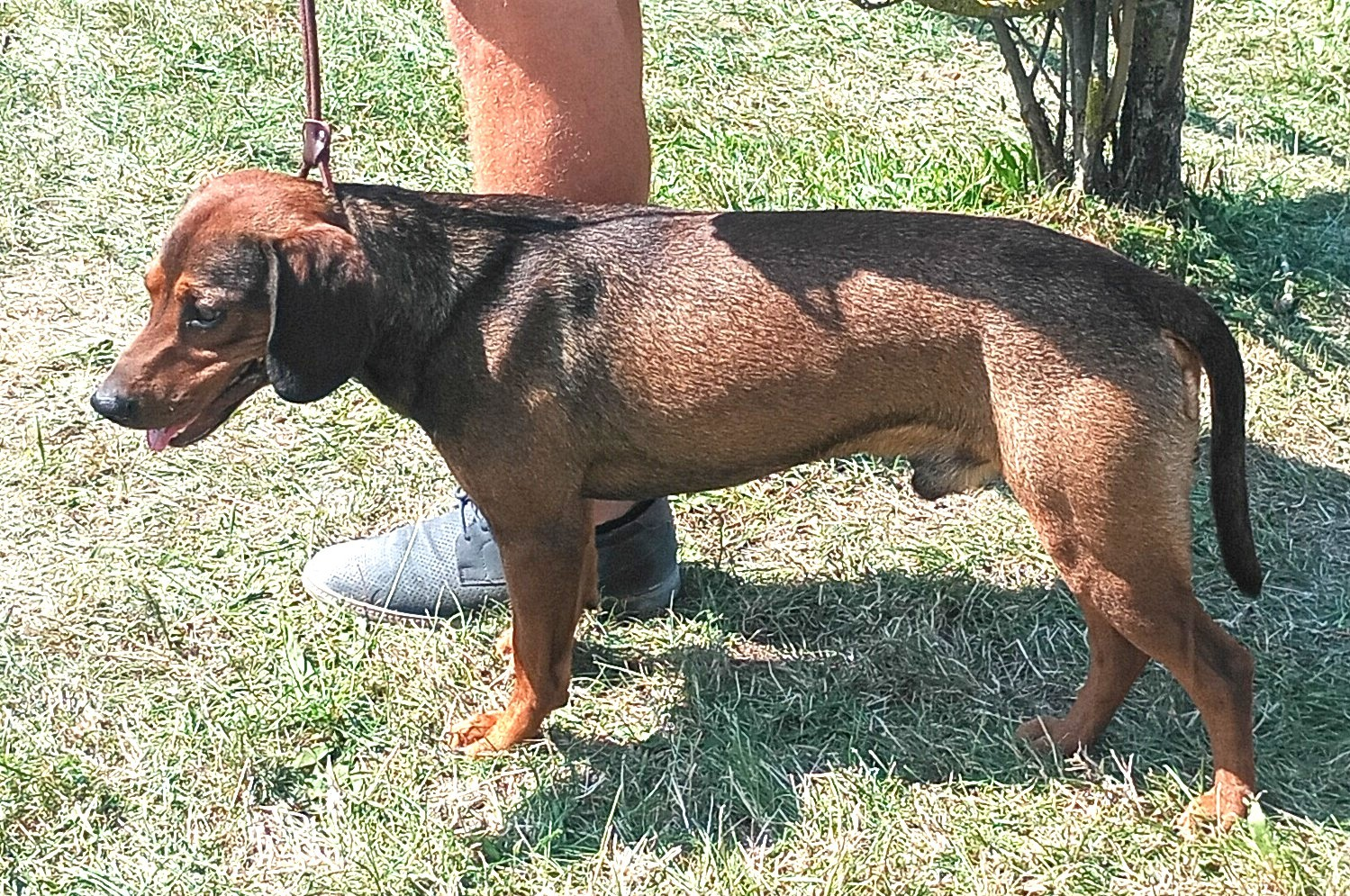
- Male, deer red with shades of black hair
- Other names: Tatranský durič
- Origin: Slovakia
Traits
Height	Males	37–42 cm (15–17 in)
	Females	34–38 cm (13–15 in)
- Coat: short
- Color: black&tan or brown
Kennel club standards
- SKJ: standard
- Fédération Cynologique Internationale: standard

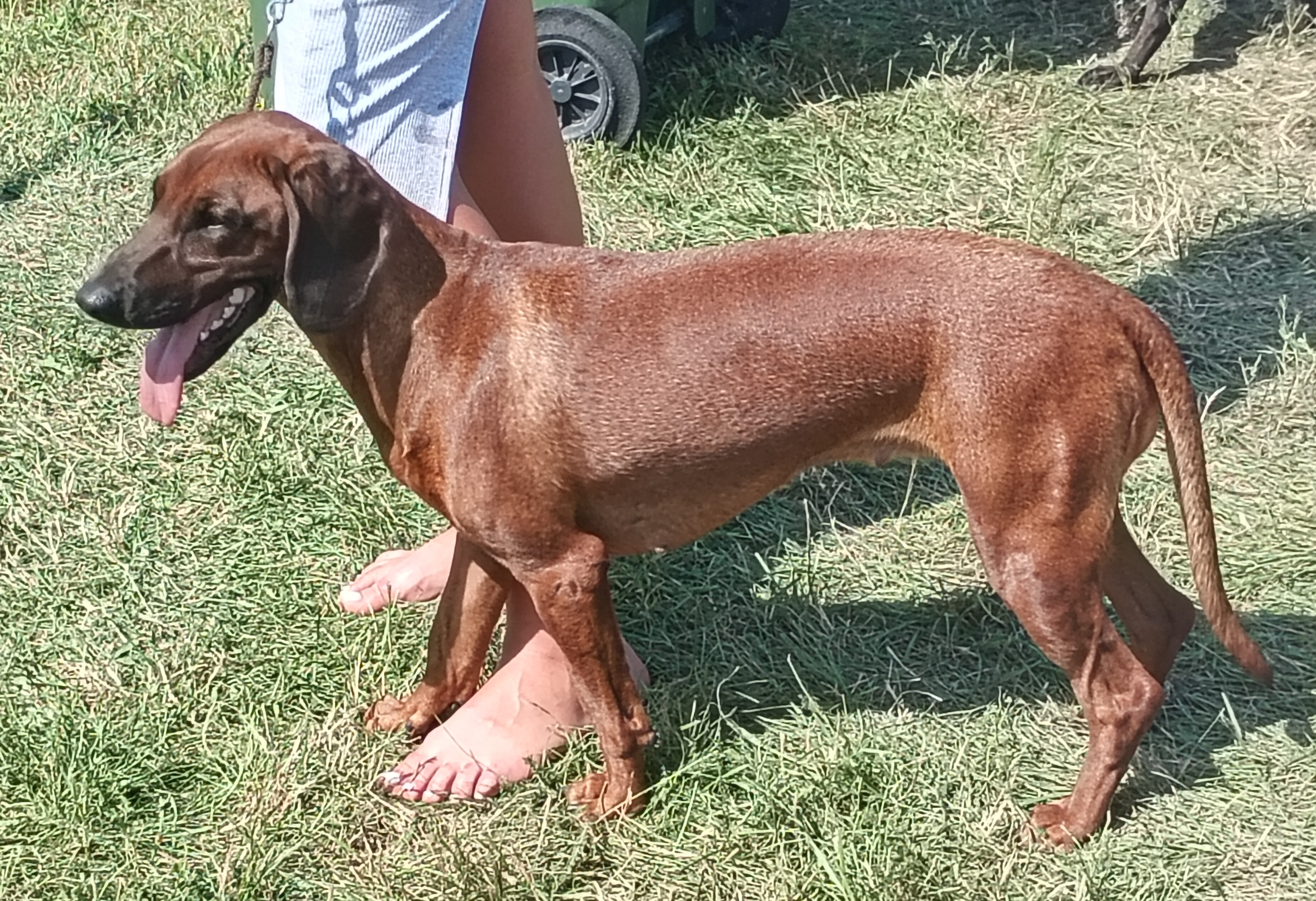
Female, showing similarities to the Bavarian Mountain Hound.

The Tatra Hound (Slovak: Tatranský durič) is a Slovak breed of dog. It is of smaller stature, used mainly for tracking and stalking game. Its use is in hunting as a hunting dog. It was approved at the SKJ AGM on June 14, 2016. It was recognised by the Fédération Cynologique Internationale in 2026. It is the youngest Slovak breed and was bred by crossing Bavarian Mountain Hound, Slovenský kopov and smooth-coated Dachshund.

== Nature and use ==
Tatra Hounds are characterized by intelligence, temperament with good controllability, balanced nature, without signs of aggression or timidity towards the environment. They are often friendly towards people. Despite their friendly nature, they are passionate at work and courageous when in contact with animals. It is persistent at work with a high sense of smell and orientation in the field. It is loud on a warm trail and near game. It is a breed that is not demanding on space and nutrition (also suitable for hunters living in the city, minimal requirements for transport by car), relatively easy to transport with regard to size (transport to a perch), durable, without significant health problems (especially hereditary diseases). Due to the expected application in practice, it is suitable for the work of a furrier and a dyer and can perform all field usability tests for these breeds.

The Tatra Hound comes in two color variants, black with well-defined brown or rust-brown markings or brown with shades from light brown to the so-called deer red, all with an admixture of black. Within the framework of the FCI system, this breed is classified in group No. 6.
