= Welsh Hound =

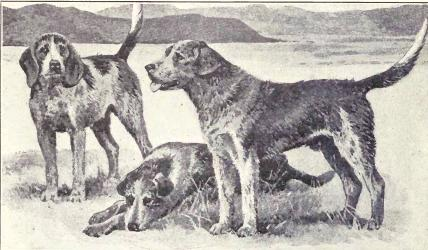

The Welsh Hound (Welsh: Bytheiad or Ci Hela Cymreig) is a breed of hunting dog of the foxhound type, indigenous to Wales.

== History ==
The Welsh Hound is a native breed to the British Isles. From medieval times through the early part of the 20th century, the bards, who had always held a special place in Welsh society, sang odes to the hounds, often naming individual hounds, and praising their qualities. "The ancient laws of Wales codified during the reign of Hywel Dda (942 – 948 AD) give the value of the Welsh Hound as 240 pence trained, 120 pence untrained. By comparison a sound pack horse was valued at the same time as 120 pence."

== Temperament ==
The Welsh Hound has been kept as a hunting dog, living and hunting in packs. It is adapted to hunting in rocky and mountainous terrain in its native Wales. It has been bred to hunt amid the Welsh for its speed, stamina and vocalizations. It is still used for drag hunting today. Welsh Hounds are expected to be immediately responsive to the huntsman's voice, but to learn commands from the responses and cues of the pack. They are known to 'talk' to the huntsman with various howls and barks signalling the progress of the hunt. While gentle, placid and friendly, they also make good house pets. They are hard to train and require consistency and firm guidance but are extremely loyal, gentle and tolerant with small children and other animals.

== Breed recognition ==
The Welsh Hound is registered with The Welsh Hound Association, which has been keeping the breed's stud book since 1922, and maintaining the breed as purebred since 1928. The association was formed "for the purpose of preserving and promoting the Welsh Fox Hound as a specific British breed". The Welsh Hound was recognized by the United Kennel Club on 1 January 2006.

Since the outlawing of hunting with dogs in Great Britain, various clubs have been offering registration for the Welsh Hound as a rare breed pet.

== Appearance ==
Coat is hard and wiry, red with white patches. Similar in appearance to the (English) Foxhound. Height : 24 in/61 cm Weight : 75 lb/34 kg.

== See also ==
- List of dog breeds
- Foxhound
