= Posavac Hound =

Posavac hound
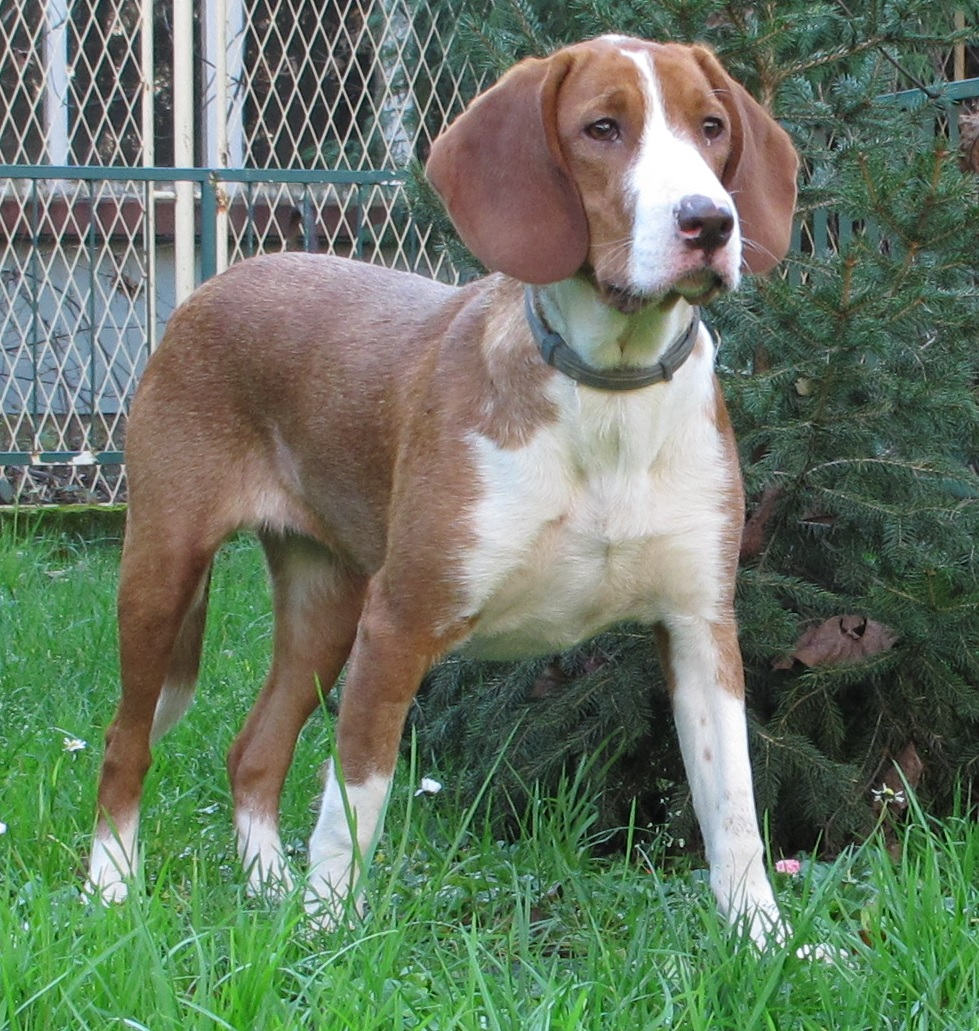
- Posavski Gonič
- Origin: Croatia
Kennel club standards
- Croatian Kennel Club: standard
- Fédération Cynologique Internationale: standard

The Posavac Hound (FCI No. 154) (Croatian: posavski gonič) is a breed of dog, originating as a hunting dog of the scenthound type. Croatia is the home country for the breed. The name translates into English as the Scenthound From The Sava Valley, but is usually translated as the Posavac Hound.

== Appearance ==
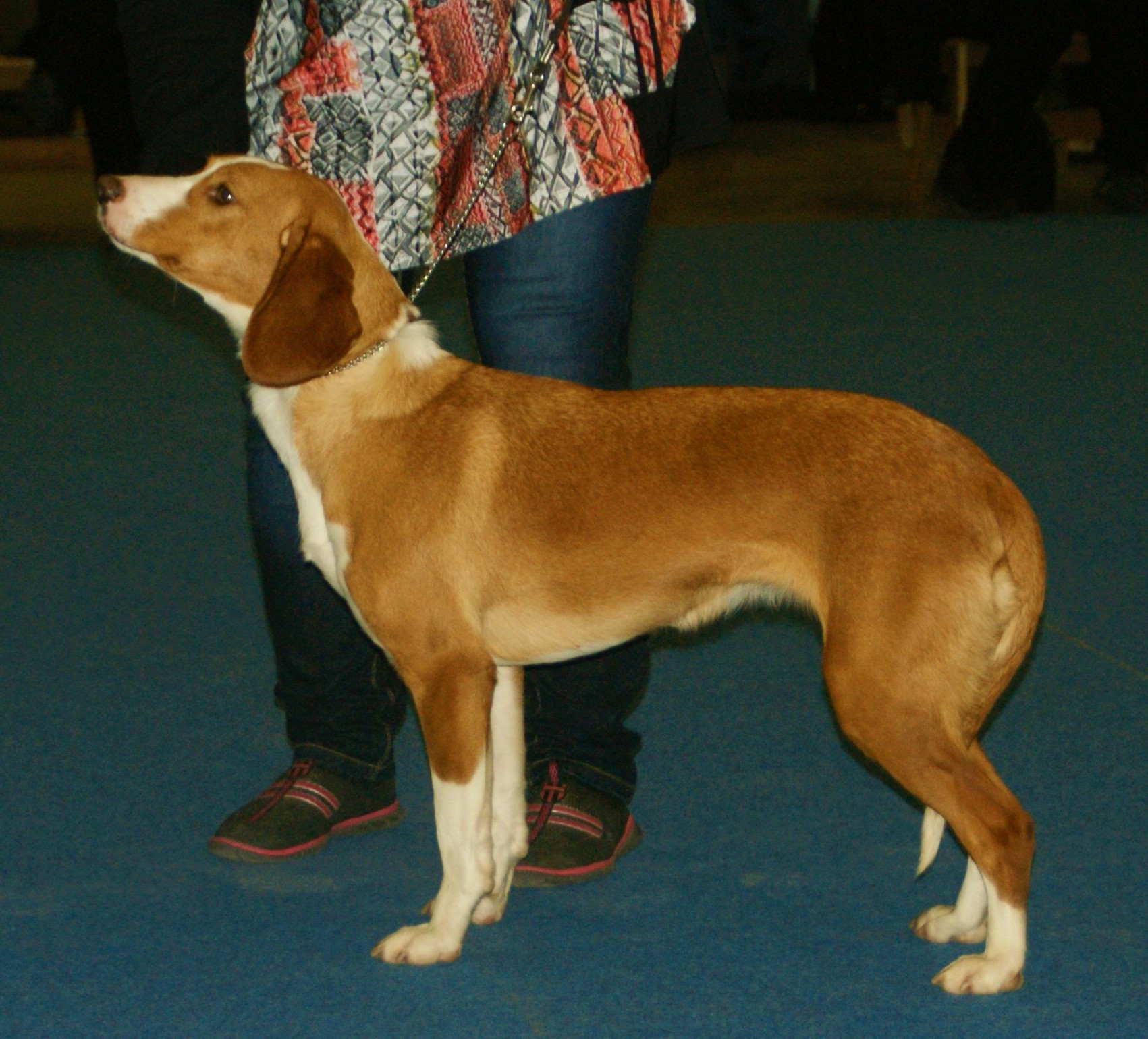
A female Posavac Hound at a show.

The Posavac Hound is a solidly built dog with a somewhat long body, close-fitting drop ears, a long tail, and a gentle expression. The breed has an ideal height around 50 cm (20 ins) at the withers. The short, flat coat is slightly longer on the belly and backs of legs (feathering). Coat colour is a reddish wheaten, marked with white.

== History ==
There is no actual proof of great antiquity for this breed, although there is much fanciful conjecture. The type is very old, and the modern breed resembles images seen in frescoes as early as 1497. Writers cited as having mentioned the type include Bishop of Đakovo Petar Bakić in 1719 and the veterinarian Franjo Bertić, also of Đakovo, in 1859. Hounds from the Sava Valley (Posavina, south-east of Zagreb) were sold as boskini in Croatia in the 1800s. The ancestry of the dogs was documented starting in 1929, when registrations for the stud book were first taken. The breed was internationally recognised by the Fédération Cynologique Internationale in 1955, and the name was clarified in 1969. The breed has been known since then as the Posavac Hound.

The breed is recognised in North America by the United Kennel Club in the Scenthound Group, and by a number of minor registries, hunting clubs, and internet-based dog registry businesses, and is promoted as a rare breed for those seeking a unique pet.

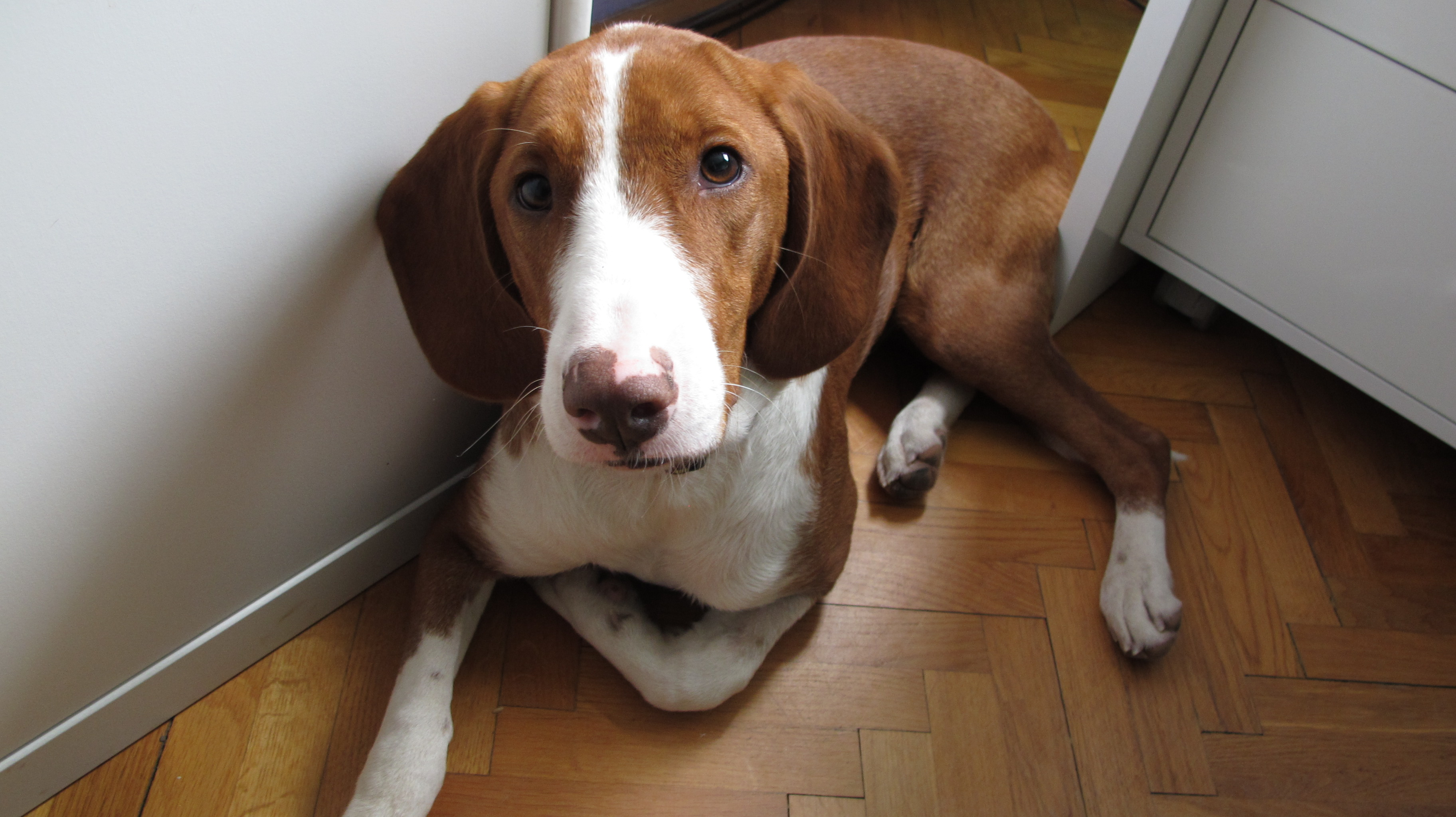
Posavac hound female at home

== Health and temperament ==
No unusual diseases or claims of extraordinary health have been documented for this breed. The breed standard describes the ideal temperament as docile and an enthusiastic hunter.

== See also ==
- List of dog breeds
- Istrian Shorthaired Hound
- Istrian Coarse-haired Hound
