= Schillerstövare =

Schillerstövare Schiller Hound
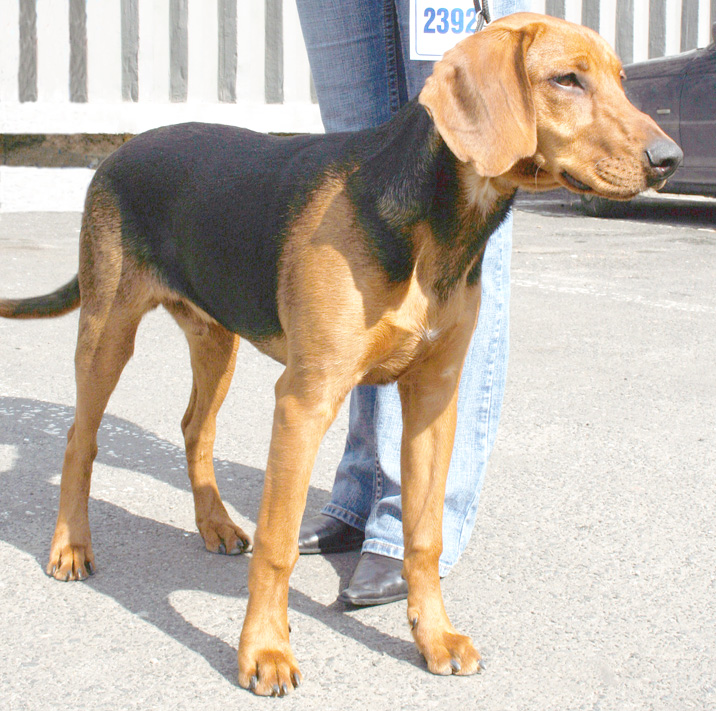
- Schillerstövare
- Other names: Schiller Bracke
- Origin: Sweden
Kennel club standards
- Fédération Cynologique Internationale: standard

The Schillerstövare, translated as the Schiller Hound in English, is a breed of dog of the scenthound type, originating as a hunting dog in Sweden in the late 19th century.

== Appearance ==
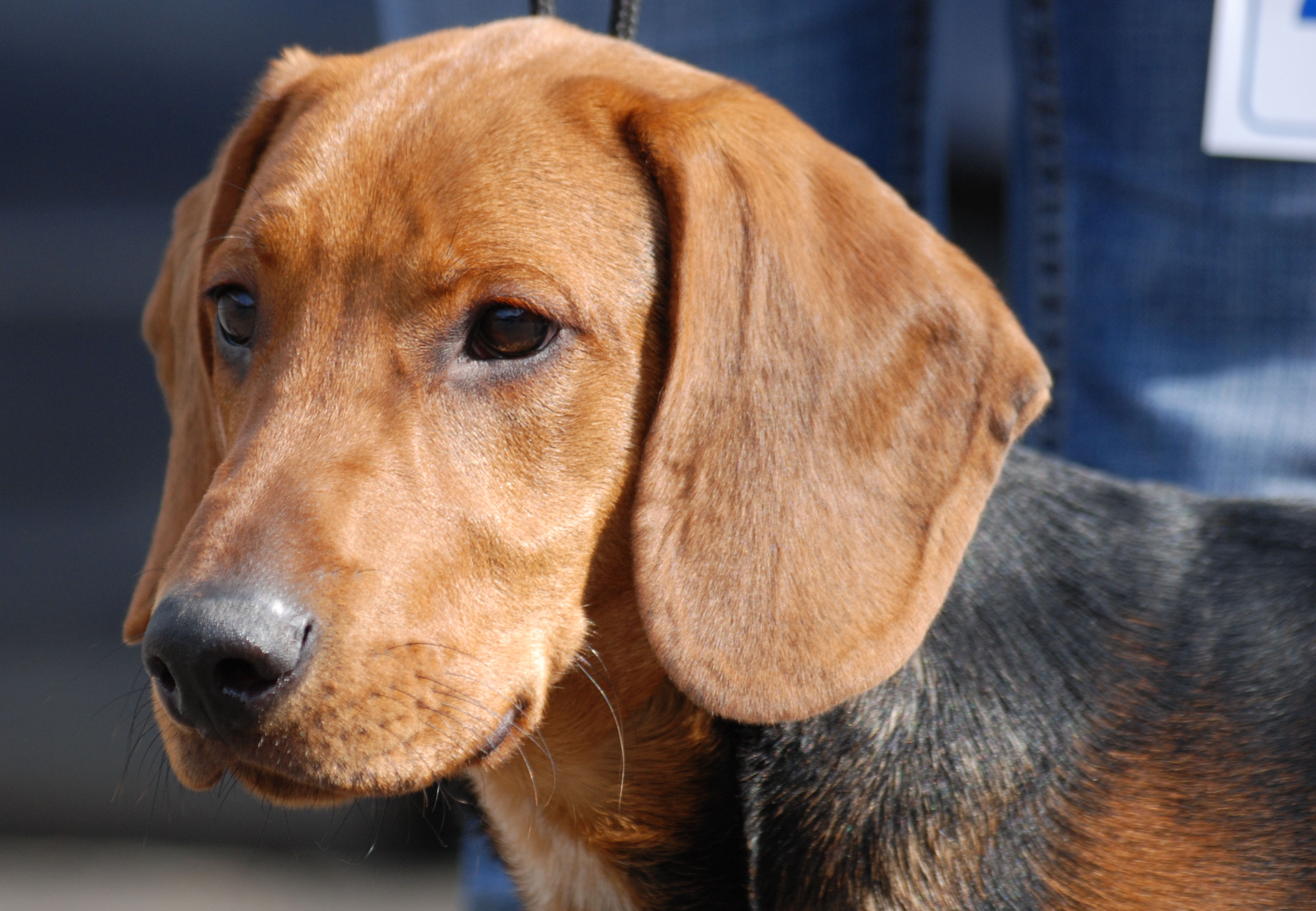
Schiller Hound head

The Schillerstövare is a medium to large sized running hound for hunting fox and hare, standing 53–61 cm (21-24 ins) at the withers and weighing 18–25 kg (40-55 lbs). The coat is harsh and not too short, lying close to the body. The colour is black and tan, a tan body with a black mantle on the back. The drop ears are broad and not excessively long, and the long tail is carried on a line with the back when running. Faults in the breed (which indicate the dog should not be bred) include items of structure that would impede running, such as obtuse angle between shoulder blade and upper arm and restricted hind movement, along with dish faced and aloofness.

== History ==
The Schillerstövare originated in southern Germany as a mix of Swiss hounds and the Harrier, and is named after a Swedish farmer, Per Schiller (1858–1892), who exhibited the breed at the first Swedish dog show in 1886. The Swedish Kennel Club recognised the breed in 1907. It is recognised internationally by the Fédération Cynologique Internationale as breed number 131. The breed is still used as a hunting dog, and was recognised by the United Kennel Club in the United States in 2006. The breed is also recognized by a number of minor registries, hunting clubs, and Internet-based dog registries.

== Health and temperament ==
No unusual diseases or claims of extraordinary health have been documented for this breed. The breed standard describes the ideal temperament as lively and attentive.

== See also ==
- List of dog breeds
