= Austrian Black and Tan Hound =

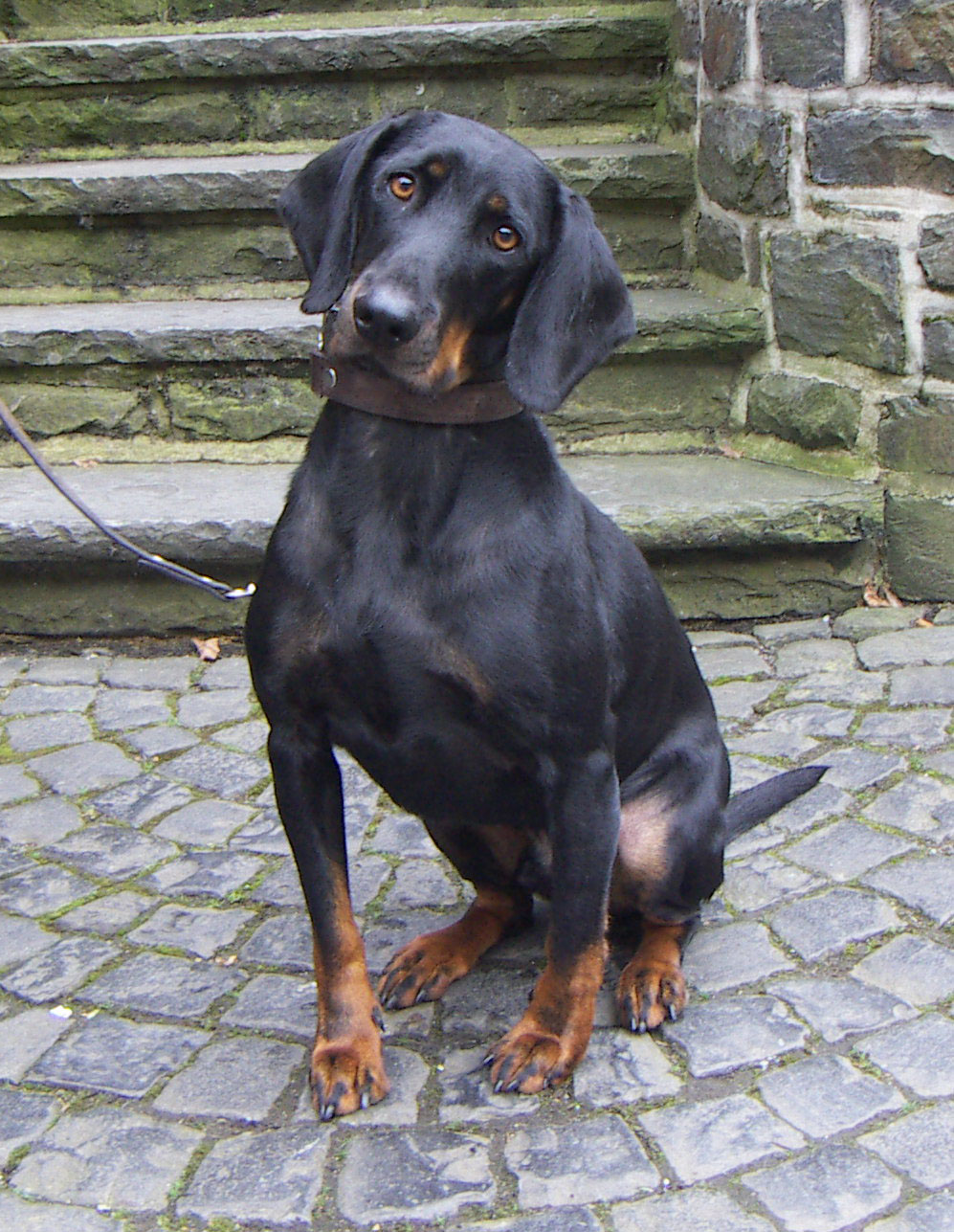
- Other names: Brandlbracke; Vieräugl; Austrian smooth-coated hound Carinthian brandlbracke Österreichescher Glatthaariger Bracke; Kärntener Hunde; Österreichische Bracke
- Common nicknames: Bracke (colloquially called Vieräugl)
- Origin: Austria
Traits
Height	Males	50–56 cm (20–22 in)
	Females	48–54 cm (19–21 in)
- Weight: 33–49 lb (15–22 kg)
- Coat: smooth, dense, and short
- Color: black with light fawn or tan markings
Kennel club standards
- United Kennel Club: standard
- Fédération Cynologique Internationale: standard

The Austrian Black and Tan Hound is a medium-sized scenthound originating in Austria and is used for tracking wounded game, most commonly hare, in high altitudes.

== History ==
The breed's history can be traced back to ancient times when the inhabitants of Austria selectively bred dogs for hunting purposes. The Austrian Black and Tan Hound's ancestors were likely a crossbreed of various Celtic hounds, possibly mixed with Jura hounds from Switzerland.

During the 19th century, Austrians began to advocate for the development of breed standards and purebred registries for their hounds. In 1884, the Österreichischen Hundezuchtvereins (lit. Austrian dog breeding club) was founded and the first dog registered was an Austrian black and tan hound named "Bergmann." The Federation Cynologique Internationale (FCI) recognized the breed in 1954 and the United Kennel Club in 2006.

== Description ==
=== Appearance ===
Colouring in this breed is highly important. The dogs have a smooth, dense and short black coat with tan or fawn markings on the legs, chest and face. Two fawn marks above the eyes must be present. The long tail is slightly bent and the ears are medium in length and lie flat with rounded tips. They are a medium-sized breed, with a large skull and brown eyes. Males are 50–56 centimetres (20–22 inches), while females are 48–54 centimetres (19–21 inches). They weigh 15–22 kilograms (33–49 pounds). The dark coat helps protect the dog from harsh weather conditions, while the tan markings make it easily visible to hunters in dense vegetation.

=== Temperament ===
It is an elegant runner, used in tracking all sorts of game. It has a lovely voice, and makes a great pet due to its affectionate and good-natured personality. It is not a dog wanting to be in a city. A suitable home will be in a rural area where the dog will have much space to run unrestricted by a leash. It loves to work.

== Uses ==
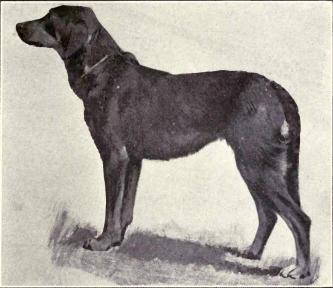
Austrian Hound from 1915

The Austrian black and tan hound has a keen sense of smell that is used to track wounded game, most commonly hare, in high altitudes. Austrian black and tan hounds have been used in the detection of emerald ash borer.

== Health ==
There are no breed-specific genetic diseases known to affect this breed, which is fairly healthy, and lives up to 12 to 14 years of age.

== Etymology ==
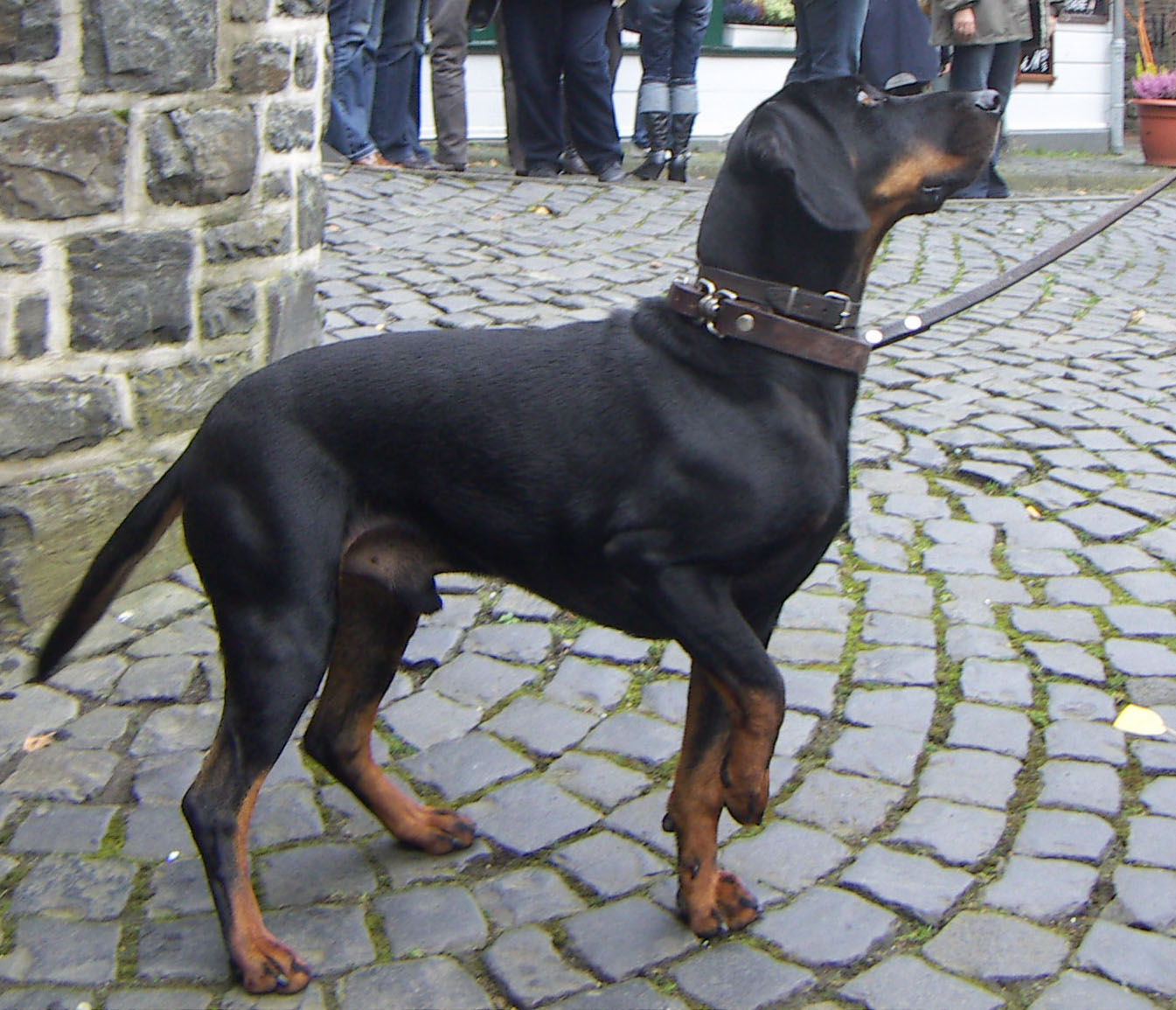
Austrian Black and Tan Hound.

The Austrian black and tan hound is known by a myriad of names including the Austrian smooth-coated hound, the Austrian or Carinthian brandlbracke or vieräugl, the Kärntener Hunde, Österreichische Bracke or the Österreichescher Glatthaariger Bracke. Brandlbracke is a compound word, stemming from "Brand" (harmful fire, fire that went out of control) which refers to the fawn markings and "Bracke", a type of hunting dog that primarily tracks through scent. Vieräugl is the Austro-Bavarian diminutive of "Vierauge", meaning: somebody our something having four eyes. It refers to the distinctive fawn markings above the eyes.

== See also ==
- List of dog breeds
