= Istrian Shorthaired Hound =

Istrian Short-haired Hound istarski kratkodlaki gonič
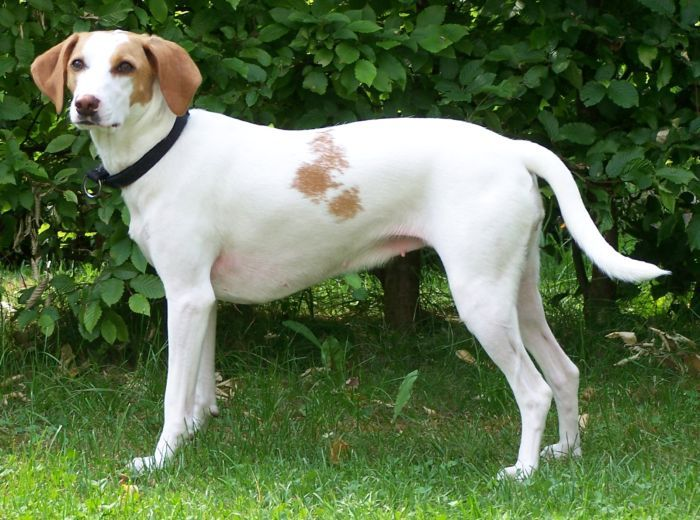
- Istrian Short-haired Hound
- Origin: Croatia
Kennel club standards
- Croatian Kennel Club: standard
- Fédération Cynologique Internationale: standard

The Istrian Short-haired Hound (Croatian: istarski kratkodlaki gonič) is a breed of dog from Istria in Croatia, descended from a very old type of scenthound. This hound is the slightly smaller counterpart to the longer-coated Istrian Coarse-haired Hound from the same region.

== Appearance ==
The Istrian Short-haired Hound has a short, smooth, glossy, hard coat, primarily white with sparse patches of orange. The breed has a typical well-muscled hound body, with long legs and a long tail. The head is fairly broad and flat (not domed on top) with short (for a hound) triangular drop ears that hang close to the head, a type typically called East European.

The ideal height for an adult dog is 50 cm (19.5 in) at the withers and weight is about 18 kg (40 lb); females are slightly smaller.

The cry or baying while hunting (important for a scenthound) is described as persistent and sharp.

== History ==
Although the name indicates Istria as the place of origin, place of formation is also Croatian Littoral and Dalmatia. A description was given by the Bishop of Đakovo Petar Bakić in 1719. The old type is seen in the Posavaz Hound and the Istrian Coarse-haired Hound, as well. The smooth- and coarse-haired hounds were used for hunting in Istria (see the article on Motovun for photographs of the sort of mountainous terrain they were bred to hunt) while the Posavaz Hound is from the Sava Valley. The Istrian hounds are thought to be the oldest of the hound breeds in the Balkan region.

A stud book was established in 1924 to document which hounds were considered of this breed. The FCI accepted the breed in 1949, but the first breed standard was not published until 1973 (the FCI does not write the breed standard, it is written in the breed's country of origin and published by the FCI to be used internationally, so that other countries will also describe the breed in the same manner as the breed's home country, and not change it to suit themselves.) It is recognised in the scenthound group 6. It is also recognised in the scenthound group in North America by the United Kennel Club. It also is recognised under its original name, the standard English translations, other translations or combinations of the translation and Croatian name by minor kennel clubs and other organisations. It also may be promoted as a rare breed for those seeking an unusual pet.

The Istrian Short-haired Hound is still kept in its homeland and in nearby areas for hunting, not as a pet, and is especially valued for hunting fox and rabbit.

== Health and temperament ==
No specific health problems or claims of extraordinary health have been documented for this breed. The ideal temperament according to the standard is docile and calm, and lively and enthusiastic when hunting.

== See also ==
- List of dog breeds
