= Istrian Coarse-haired Hound =

Istrian Coarse-haired Hound Istarski oštrodlaki gonič
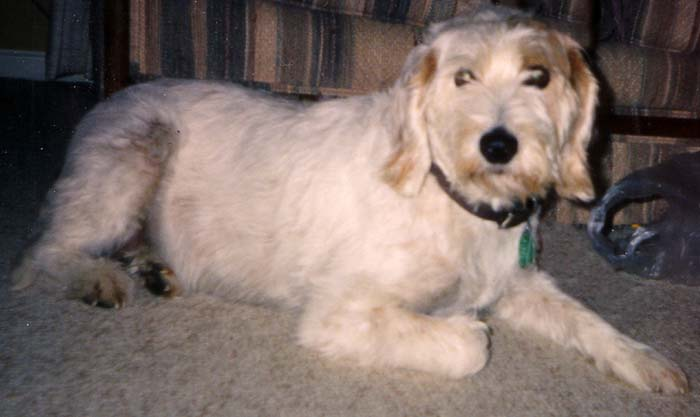
- Istrian Coarse-haired Hound
- Other names: Istrian Rough-coated Hound
- Origin: Croatia
Kennel club standards
- Croatian Kennel Club: standard
- Fédération Cynologique Internationale: standard

The Istrian Coarse-haired Hound (Croatian: istarski oštrodlaki gonič, Slovene: istrski ostrodlaki gonič) is a dog breed from Croatia. It is a rough-coated scent hound still kept primarily as a hunting dog rather than as a pet.

== Description ==
=== Appearance ===
Dogs of this breed can vary considerably in size, as the dog is still bred primarily for hunting, so more emphasis might be placed on performance than on specific appearance requirements. It can range from 26 to 60 lb (12 to 27 kg) and stand 17 to 24 inches (43 to 60 cm) at the withers.

The breed's wiry coat is weather resistant for hunting. The topcoat is 2 to 3 inches (5 to 8 cm) long and it has a woolly undercoat. The color is white with yellow or orange markings, usually on the ears. The ears are broad and hang flat with a long upstanding curved inwards tail.

=== Temperament ===
Again, because the Istrian Coarse-haired Hound has been bred primarily for hunting rather than as a companion, it tends to be willful and hence more challenging to train than many other breeds.

== History ==
Although the name indicates Istria as the place of origin, place of formation is also Croatian Littoral, Dalmatia, Gorski Kotar and Lika. The breed first took part in a conformation show in Vienna in 1866.

The origin of the Istrian Coarse-haired Hound has been disputed since the 1960s, with competing claims from Croatia and Slovenia. In 2003 the Fédération Cynologique Internationale recognized the breed as originating in Croatia.

== See also ==
- List of dog breeds
- Istrian Shorthaired Hound
- Posavac Hound
