= List of dog breeds originating from England =

The Kennel Club (KC), the United Kingdom's official kennel club, recognises over 200 pedigree dog breeds. This list includes dog breeds that are generally considered to have originated in England, some of which are also recognised by other major kennel clubs and organisations such as the Fédération Cynologique Internationale (FCI). Breeds are included if reputable sources describe them as originating in England, extinct breeds and unrecognised local types are also listed where documented.

Name	Other names used	Recognition	Place of origin (within England)	Notes	Image
Airedale Terrier	Waterside Terrier Bingley Terrier	KC FCI	Airedale, West Riding of Yorkshire	Largest of the British terriers, traditionally nicknamed the "King of Terriers"	
Basset Hound		KC FCI		Originally French; modern breed developed from British stock	
Beagle	English Beagle	KC FCI			
Bedlington Terrier	Rothbury Terrier Rothbury's Lamb	KC FCI	Bedlington, Northumberland		
Bloodhound	Chien de St. Hubert St. Hubert Hound Sleuth-hound English Bloodhound	KC FCI			
Border Collie		KC FCI	Anglo-Scottish border		
Border Terrier		KC FCI	Anglo-Scottish border		
Buckhound				Extinct	
Bull Terrier	English Bull Terrier Bully	KC FCI	Birmingham, West Midlands		
Bulldog	English Bulldog British Bulldog	KC FCI			
Bullmastiff		KC FCI			
Cavalier King Charles Spaniel		KC FCI			
Clumber Spaniel		KC FCI	Nottinghamshire		
Cumberland Sheepdog			Cumberland	Extinct Claimed to be ancestor of the Australian Shepherd	
Cur				Extinct	
Curly-coated Retriever	Curly	KC FCI			
English Cocker Spaniel	Cocker English Cocker Working Cocker Cocker Spaniel	KC FCI			
English Foxhound	Foxhound	KC FCI			
English Mastiff	Mastiff	KC FCI			
English Setter	Laverack Llewellin (or Llewellyn) Setter	KC FCI			
English Springer Spaniel	Springer English Springer Springer Spaniel Working Springer	KC FCI			
English Toy Terrier (Black & Tan)		KC FCI			
English Water Spaniel				Extinct	
English White Terrier				Extinct Ancestor to the Jack Russel terrier	
Field Spaniel		KC FCI			
Flat-coated Retriever	Flatcoat Flattie	KC FCI			
Greyhound	English Greyhound	KC FCI			
Jack Russell Terrier	Jack Russell	KC FCI	Swimbridge, North Devon		
King Charles Spaniel	English Toy Spaniel Toy Spaniel Charlies Prince Charles Spaniel Ruby Spaniel Blenheim Spaniel	KC FCI			
Labrador Retriever	Labrador Lab	KC FCI		British retriever developed from the St. John’s water dog of Newfoundland	
Lakeland Terrier		KC FCI	Lake District of Cumbria		
Lancashire Heeler		KC FCI (provisionally)	Ormskirk, Lancashire		
Lucas Terrier		None			
Manchester Terrier		KC FCI	Manchester		
Miniature Bull Terrier	Mini Bull	KC FCI			
Norfolk Spaniel	Shropshire Spaniel			Extinct	
Norfolk Terrier		KC FCI	East Anglia		
North Country Beagle				Extinct	
Northern Inuit Dog		None		Closely related to other Northern-breed crosses such as the Tamaskan	
Norwich Terrier		KC FCI	Norwich, Norfolk		
Old English Bulldog				Extinct Ancestor of the modern Bulldog and Bullmastiff	
Old English Sheepdog	Shepherd's Dog Bobtail	KC FCI	South-western counties of England		
Otterhound		KC FCI			
Parson Russell Terrier	Parson Parson Jack Russell Terrier	KC FCI	Swimbridge, North Devon		
Patterdale Terrier		None	Patterdale, Cumbria		
Plummer Terrier		None			
Pointer	English Pointer	KC FCI			
Russell Terrier		None		Roots in English Jack Russell terriers; developed as a breed in Australia	
Smithfield	Smithfield Collie Smithfield Sheepdog	None	Smithfield Market, London		
Smooth Fox Terrier	Both are called Fox Terriers	KC FCI	Earliest showing in Islington, London	Both are Fox terriers and descend from the same breed	
Wire Fox Terrier	Both are called Fox Terriers	KC FCI		Both are Fox terriers and descend from the same breed	
Staffordshire Bull Terrier	Stafford Staffy	KC FCI	Staffordshire		
Staghound				Extinct	
Sussex Spaniel	Sussex	KC FCI	Sussex		
Talbot				Extinct	
Toy Bulldog				Extinct	
Tweed Water Spaniel	Tweed Spaniel Ladykirk Spaniel			Extinct Ancestor to the Golden Retriever and Curly-coated Retriever	
West Country Harrier	Somerset Harrier		Devon and Somerset		
Whippet		KC FCI			
Yorkshire Terrier	Yorkie	KC FCI	Yorkshire and Lancashire		

== See also ==
- List of dog breeds
- List of dog breeds originating from Scotland
- List of dog breeds originating from Wales
