= King's White Hound =

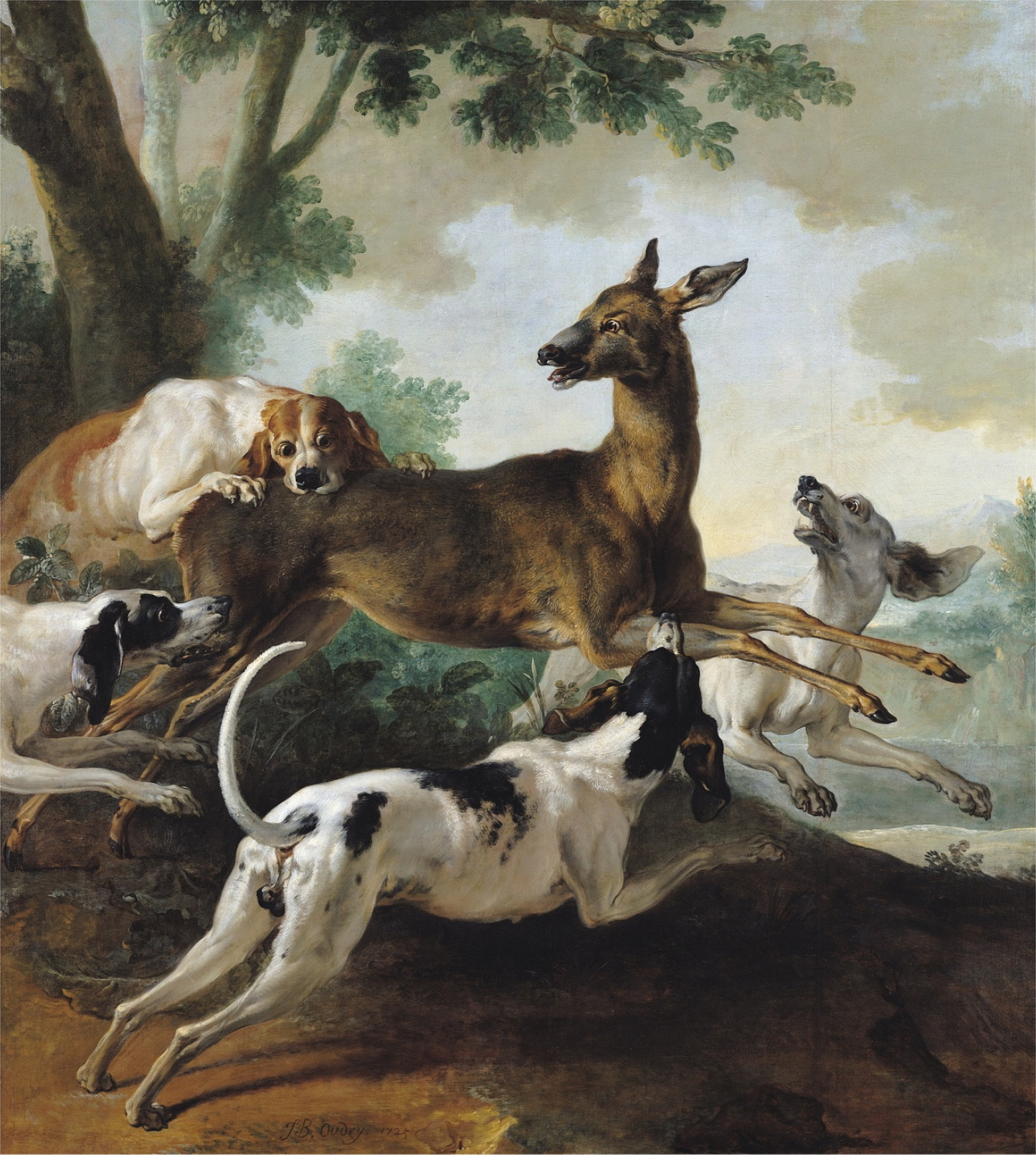
- Other names: Chien Blanc du Roi
- Origin: France
- Breed status: Extinct

The King's White Hound, the Chien Blanc du Roi in French, was a breed of scent hound from France that is now extinct. The breed was said to be the favourite of the French kings from Louis XI to Louis XIV.

== History ==
The King's White Hounds were said to have descended from a pure white St. Hubert Hound named Souillard that was gifted to King Louis XI by a poor squire from Poitou in 1470. The hound was passed to the king's daughter, Anne de Beaujeu, he was widely used at stud and his white progeny gradually replaced the hounds in the king's pack until the whole pack was white. Several notable infusions of outside blood were added to the pack, in 1500 Louis XII introduced an Italian Pointer called Greffier, in 1520 François I introduced a powerful Grand Fauve de Bretagne called Miraud, and in 1560 Mary, Queen of Scots gifted a Talbot Hound named Barraud to her husband François II, all of these infusions improved the breed.

The White Hounds reached the height of their fame during the reign of Louis XIII (1610–1643) when they were renowned throughout Europe for their speed, being able to run a stag down in half an hour and kill four stags in a day's hunting. By this time the breed displayed many sighthound features and hunted as much by sight as by scent. By Louis XIII's death the hunt employed over 90 hunt servants, and under Louis XIV the pack consisted of over 100 hounds and costs continued to rise.

Towards the end of Louis XIV's reign (1643–1715) the king was becoming too infirm to follow the fast paced White Hounds on horseback, wishing to follow the hunt from a carriage from 1700 the hounds were crossed with the slower Norman Hounds to slow them down. At the beginning of his reign (1715–1774), Louis XV wanted to revive the pack, so his son the Count of Toulouse procured English Staghounds which were crossed with the pack. In 1725 the pack was dispersed and the king adopted a new pack consisting of English Foxhound crosses.

The King's White Hounds are believed to have been foundational in the development of a number of French hound breeds, including the Grand Griffon Vendéen, the Porcelaine and the Billy, the latter is sometimes called the Chien Blanc du Roi.

== Characteristics ==
The King's White Hounds were large, powerful hounds, initially they were deep scenting, long eared scent hounds close to the St. Hubert Hound, later they displayed many features of sighthounds. Charles IX said of them they "were as tall as grey-hounds, with heads as fine as braques ..." Whilst initially all white in colour, despite their name the White Hounds in fact came in a number of colours from pure white, to white with yellow, red or black spots or patches, to badger or pure black. They were said to have great courage and were not easily distracted by the large retinue of hunt followers that followed the royal hunts.

== See also ==
- List of extinct dog breeds
