= Staghound =

Extinct breed of scent hound

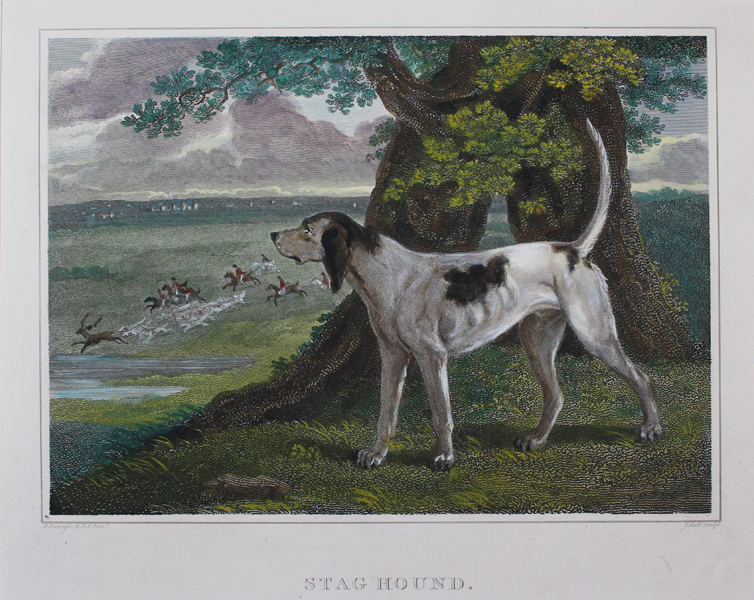
- Other names: English Staghound
- Origin: England
- Breed status: Extinct
Traits
- Height: Up to 27 in (69 cm)
- Coat: Short
- Colour: Usually bi-colour; white with yellow, lemon or badger

The Staghound, sometimes referred to as the English Staghound, is an extinct breed of scent hound from England. A pack hound, the breed was used to hunt red deer and became extinct in the 19th century when the last pack was sold.

== History ==
The Staghound most likely developed from Southern Hounds, which were themselves developed from Talbot Hounds and Norman Hounds introduced into England by the Normans in the 11th century after their conquest of the country. As seen from the Norman Forest laws, in medieval England the hunting of red deer, or stag, was the exclusive domain of the monarch and their favourites, and the Staghound was developed to hunt the stag in packs, becoming an important dog breed in England. From at least the reign of Henry III (1216–1272), different hounds were maintained in England for hunting different deer species, with the Staghound kept to hunt stag, and the smaller Buckhound kept to hunt fallow deer or buck.

The Staghound shared many characteristics with French hound breeds; there was likely interbreeding between the hounds of France and England as the exchange of hounds as gifts was common between royal courts and noble houses. It has been claimed the Staghound most closely resembled the King's White Hounds, the hound breed of the French kings. At the beginning of his reign, Louis XV of France wanted to improve the quality of his royal pack, and sought English Staghounds, procured by the Count of Toulouse, to achieve this, as English Staghounds were described as "fleeter and more vigorous and better hunters" than the hounds in the royal pack.

With the gradual destruction of the forests of England and the increased cultivation of the country, the deer's habitat was reduced, and from the 17th century, the sport began to decline in popularity, being supplanted by fox hunting. The Staghound was one of the foundation breeds used in the development of the Foxhound.

The last pack of Staghounds in England were those of the North Devon Hunt, predecessor of the Devon and Somerset Staghounds, which pursued stag in the Royal forests of Exmoor until 1825, when the pack was sold at Tattersalls. The pack was purchased by a Mr Charles Shard of Somborne House in Hampshire; the terrain in Hampshire consists of flintier soil than Devon, and it was found that whilst hunting this country the ground caused consistent injuries to the Staghound's paws, so the pack was sold again in 1826 after just one season. The majority of the pack was purchased by a German buyer who exported them to Germany; most of these animals were subsequently destroyed during a rabies outbreak. After this time, all hound packs kept in England for the hunting of deer are predominantly derived from Foxhounds, despite their usually being referred to as "Staghounds".

Prior to their 1825 sale, some of the North Devon Staghounds were acquired by enthusiasts in Devon including Parson John Froude, and it is thought that their bloodlines contributed to the development of the West Country Harrier. Parson Jack Russell was so upset by the impending loss of the breed to England that in 1826 he managed to purchase three bitches prior to their departure for Germany. Hoping to somehow resurrect the breed from these three hounds, when this proved impossible Parson Russel passed these hounds on to a friend called John Dillwyn Llewelyn of Swansea who used them to improve local Welsh Hounds, their influence is still seen in that breed. In 1826, some of the North Devon Staghounds were also purchased by enthusiasts who resided near the Epping Forest; the fate of these hounds is unknown.

== Description ==
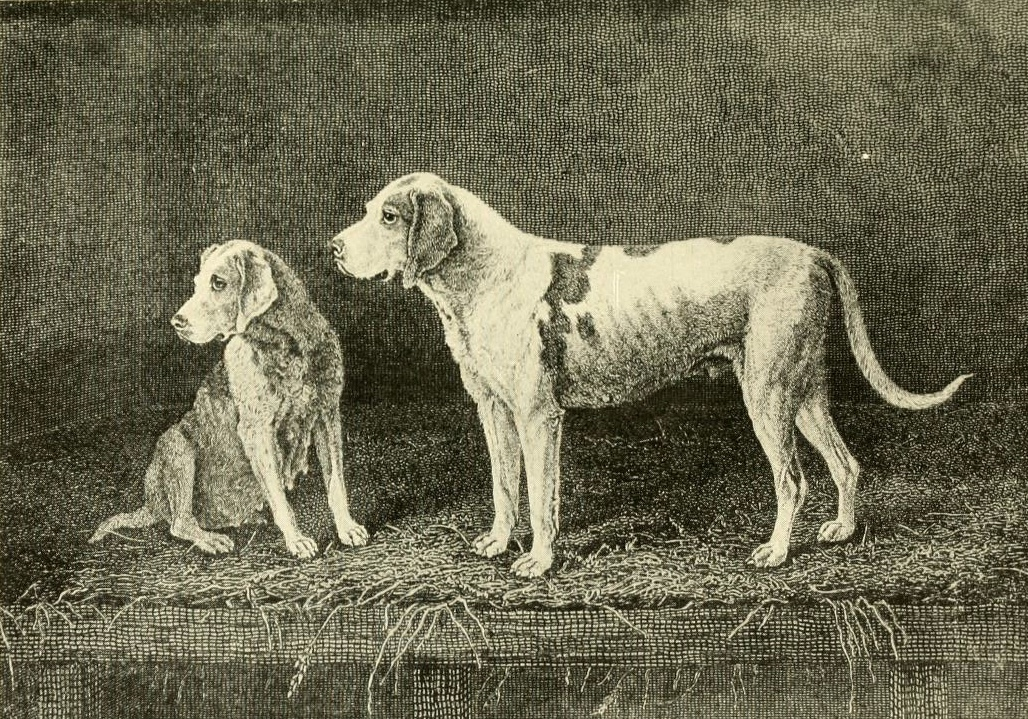
North Devon Staghounds, Governor and Famous, 1826.

The Staghound was said to be a strong, powerfully built breed standing up to 27 inches (69 cm) at the shoulder, with significant sexual dimorphism in size, with dogs being larger than bitches. The breed had a short coat that usually bi-coloured with yellow, lemon or badger patches on a white background, yellow and white was said to be the most common colour. The breed had a long head with a broad nose, they were renowned for their deep scenting abilities. Compared to the Foxhound, the Staghound was taller, more heavily built and slower. An 1826 portrait exists of two Staghounds from the North Devon hunt, a dog and bitch: "Governor" and "Famous".

== See also ==
- List of extinct dog breeds
