= List of dog breeds originating from Scotland =

List of Scottish dog breeds

The Kennel Club (KC), the United Kingdom’s official kennel club, recognises over 200 pedigree dog breeds. This list includes dog breeds that are generally considered to have originated in Scotland, some of which are also recognised by other major kennel clubs and organisations such as the Fédération Cynologique Internationale (FCI). Breeds are included if reputable sources describe them as originating in Scotland or of Anglo-Scottish origin, extinct breeds and unrecognised local types are also listed where documented.

Name	Other names used	Recognition	Place of origin (within Scotland)	Notes	Image
Bearded Collie	Highland Collie Mountain Collie Hairy Mou'ed Collie Beardie	KC FCI	Borders and Highlands	Earliest written reference to the Bearded Collie comes from 1891 Widely believed to be descended of the ancestors of the Polish Lowland Sheepdog	
Border Collie		KC FCI	Anglo-Scottish border		
Border Terrier		KC FCI	Anglo-Scottish border		
Cairn Terrier		KC FCI	Scottish Highlands (especially Isle of Skye)		
Dandie Dinmont Terrier	Dandie Hindlee Terrier	KC FCI	Anglo-Scottish border		
Dumfriesshire hound			Glenholm Kennels, Kettleholm, near Lockerbie, Dumfriesshire	Extinct	
Golden Retriever	Flat-coated Retriever Golden Yellow or Golden Retriever	KC FCI	Guisachan, Scottish Highlands		
Gordon Setter	Black and Tan Setter	KC FCI	Gordon Castle, Moray, and Scottish Highlands		
Paisley Terrier	Clydesdale Terrier Silky		Paisley and the Clyde Valley (Clydesdale), south-west Scotland	Extinct	
Rough Collie	Collie Long-Haired Collie	KC FCI	Scottish Highlands		
Scottish Deerhound	Deerhound	KC FCI	Scottish Highlands		
Scottish Terrier	Scottie Aberdeenie	KC FCI	North-east Scotland (notably around Aberdeen)		
Shetland Sheepdog	Sheltie	KC FCI	Shetland Islands		
Skye Terrier	Scotch Terrier	KC FCI	Isle of Skye		
Smooth Collie		KC FCI			
Sporting Lucas Terrier		None			
West Highland White Terrier	Westie/Westy Poltalloch Terrier Roseneath Terrier White Roseneath Terrier	KC FCI	West Highlands (notably Poltalloch and Roseneath, Argyll)		

== See also ==
- List of dog breeds
- List of dog breeds originating from England
- List of dog breeds originating from Wales
