= Braque Dupuy =

Dog breed

Braque du Puy
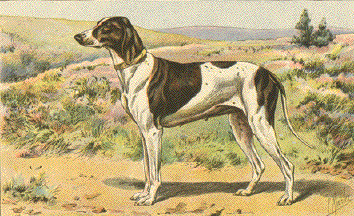
- Braque du Puy, c. 1917

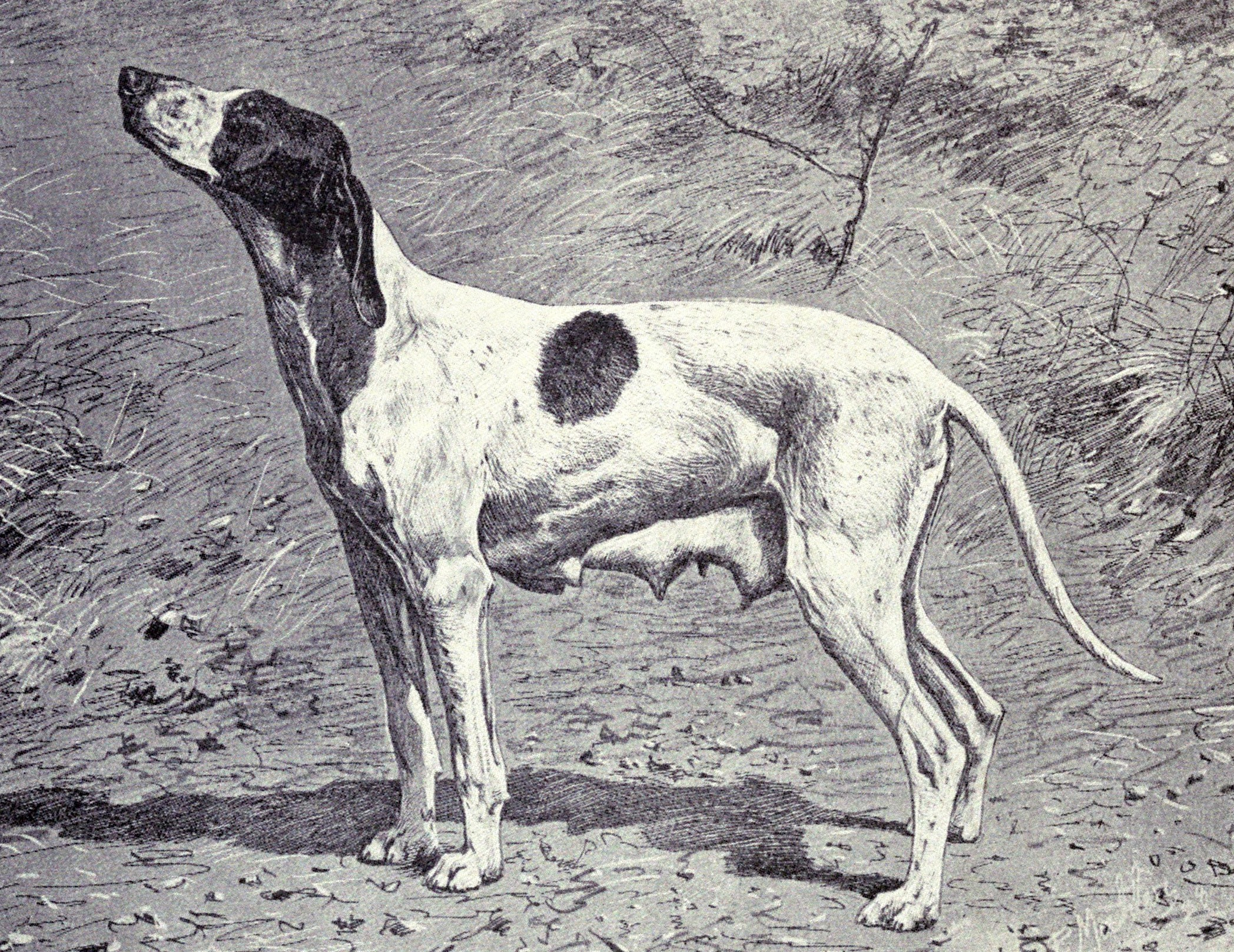
- Dupuy Pointer dam, c. 1915
- Other names: Dupuy Pointer
- Common nicknames: Greyhound pointer Greyhound braque
- Origin: France
- Breed status: Extinct
Traits
- Height: 65–69 cm (26–27 in)
- Weight: 22–28 kg (49–62 lb)
- Coat: Short and fine
- Colour: White with dark brown patches and some ticking

The Braque Dupuy, also known as the Dupuy Pointer, was a breed of pointing dog from the Poitou region of France. The breed is extinct.

== History ==
The Braque Dupuy was more closely related to the Pointer than it was to the other French braque breeds; its foundation stock was extensively outcrossed to the English Pointer and some believe there were minor introductions of Greyhound and Sloughi bloodlines, giving the breed additional pace.

Other stories abound about the breed's genesis; one that it was created from by a breeder named Dupuy from Braques Français from the kennels of the Marquis of Rochelambert, another that it was an ancient breed saved from extinction during the French Revolution by a gamekeeper named Dupuy in the Abbey of Argensois, another that it was created in the 19th century by two gamekeeper brothers named Dupuy who crossed a Braque Français dam with a Sloughi sire named Zidar, another that it was created by a huntsman named Dupuy who crossed his wonderful dam Leda with a sire of unknown ancestry named Mylord, and finally one in which the breed was created by crossing an exceptional Poitou Pointer with an imported Greyhound.

== Appearance ==
The Braque Dupuy had a long slender head and generally racy appearance, reminiscent of a sighthound; it was the tallest of the French braque breeds, standing 65 to 69 centimetres (26 to 27 in), was predominantly white with dark brown markings and had an undocked tail. It was not well known outside France, was always rare within France, and is generally believed to be extinct today, although there are claims to the contrary.

== In popular culture ==
During an episode of the television program Rick Steves' Europe, originally aired in October 2014, Rick Steves made note of an estate keeper of a castle in the Loire Valley who possessed, as hunting dogs, approximately 70 mongrel dogs who are crossbreeds between an English Foxhound and a Braque Dupuy.

== See also ==
- Media related to Braque du Puy at Wikimedia Commons
- List of dog breeds
- List of extinct dog breeds
