= List of extinct dog breeds =

The following is a list of extinct dog breeds, varieties, landraces and types.

== List of extinct dog breeds, varieties, landraces and types ==
Name	Image	Notes
African hairless dog		Also known as Abyssinian sand terriers and African sand dogs among many other names, they were found in Egypt, Ethiopia, and among the Zulu.
Alaunt		Large running dogs used during the Middle Ages to seize and bring down game for the hunter to dispatch; they were described as having the body of a Greyhound with a broad and short brachycephalic-type head.
Alpine mastiff		A mastiff-type dog known in the Western Alps from the Middle Ages, it is sometimes claimed they were descended from dogs introduced to the area by the Romans; a short-haired dog that is believed to be the progenitor of the St. Bernard.
Argentine polar dog		A long-haired breed developed by the Argentine Army to act as sled dogs in the country's Argentine Antarctic Program. The creation of the Antarctic Treaty System forced Argentina to remove all of the dogs from the continent, since they were an exotic animal. The army then ended their dog breeding program and the remaining dogs were moved to Patagonia where most of them succumbed to diseases, since living their entire lives in Antarctica away from other dogs had made them lose their natural immunity to the common diseases of dogs.
Belgian Mastiff		A mastiff-type breed that was used throughout the Low Countries as a draught dog, it was a large, powerful dog with a smooth coat and docked tail; its role became redundant in the 20th century and it is now believed to be extinct.
Black and Tan Terrier		A British breed of terrier that was common throughout all of Great Britain, it had a rough coat that was black and tan in colour; most of the Fell terrier breeds, including the Border Terrier, Lakeland Terrier, Patterdale Terrier and Welsh Terrier, descend from it.
Braque Dupuy		A French breed of pointer from the Poitou region; known for its pace compared to other French pointing breeds, it was sometimes claimed that Greyhound or Sloughi blood was used in their breeding.
Buckhound		An English breed of scenthound; used to hunt fallow deer in packs.
Bullenbeisser		A German hunting-mastiff known from the Middle Ages, used to hunt stag, wild boar and even bear; it is considered to be the progenitor of the Boxer.
Celtic Hound		The Celtic hounds were a breed of dogs in Gaelic Ireland described in Irish legend. Also known as the vertragus, they were popular breeds throughout many ancient civilisations; considered to be the ancestor of modern day sighthound breeds such as the Greyhound.
Chien-gris		A French breed of scenthound known in the Middle Ages, it was said to have been introduced to France from the east by King Louis IX when he returned from the Crusades.
Córdoba fighting dog		A fighting dog type developed in Córdoba, Argentina and one of the ancestors of the Dogo Argentino.
Cumberland Sheepdog		A British herding dog from Cumberland that was very similar to the Border Collie; its numbers declined from the mid-20th century onward.
Cur		A British breed of herding dog used by cattle drovers in England, it was known for its distinctive stumpy tail; it likely became extinct in the mid-19th century.
Dalbo dog		The Dalbo dog (Dalbohund) or Dalsland Mastiff is an extinct livestock guardian dog breed from Sweden.
Dogo Cubano		A Cuban breed of mastiff originally used for bull-baiting, dog fighting and recapturing runaway slaves; believed to have been descended from introduced Spanish Mastiffs, they became extinct in the mid-20th century.
Dumfriesshire Black and Tan Foxhound		A British pack of foxhounds from Scotland bred in the interwar period; a combination of English Foxhound, Welsh Foxhound, Bloodhound and Gascon Saintongeois blood, they were a unique black and tan coloured pack; the pack was disbanded after foxhunting was banned in Great Britain in 2002.
English Water Spaniel		A British breed of gundog that was described as being between a spaniel and a retriever in appearance; very popular with wildfowlers in the mid-19th century, it is considered to be the progenitor of both the Curly-Coated Retriever and the Flat-Coated Retriever (which both surpassed it in popularity) and it disappeared around the end of the 19th century.
English White Terrier		A British breed of terrier from England that was all-white in appearance; it was the progenitor of the Fox Terrier and one of several progenitors of the Bull Terrier.
Fila da Terceira		A mastiff-type dog from the Azores, it was the ancestor of both the Saint Miguel Cattle Dog and the Fila Brasileiro.
Fuegian dog		A domesticated form of the culpeo (Lycalopex culpaeus).
Grand Fauve de Bretagne		A French breed of scenthound from Brittany that was used to hunt wolves and wild boar; the breed became extinct in the late 19th century after the extirpation of wolves from much of France.
Halls Heeler		An Australian breed of cattle-herding dog bred from imported Scotch collies crossed with dingoes; it is claimed that they were the progenitor of the Australian Cattle Dog.
Hare Indian Dog		Possibly a dog breed, coydog, or domesticated coyote; formerly found and originally bred in northern Canada by the Hare Indians for coursing.
Hawaiian Poi Dog		A Hawaiian pye-dog that was kept by the native Hawaiians before European settlement; the Hawaiian Poi Dog was kept as both a pet and for human consumption, it also played a ceremonial role in Hawaiian culture; taking its name from poi, which was its main diet. It became extinct after the introduction of European dog breeds to the islands.
King's White Hound		A French breed of scenthound that was kept by the Kings of France from Louis XI to Louis XV; known as the Chien Blanc du Roi in French, they became extinct when Louis XV disbanded the pack in 1725.
Kurī		It was introduced to New Zealand by the Polynesian ancestors of the Māori during their migration from East Polynesia in the 13th century AD.
Laconian	statue of a Statue of a hunting dog with Laconian characteristics found in the sanctuary of Artemis Brauronia on the Acropolis.	An extinct Spartan hunting dog typically used for hunting; known for its olfactory abilities.
Lapponian Shepherd		Also known as Cockhill's Finnish Lapphound; it became extinct in the 1980s.
Limer		A scenthound in the Middle Ages used to locate a stag on the morning of a stag hunt, the limer was kept on a leash and led the huntsman to the stag, which was subsequently hunted by other hound types; limers were known for their scenting ability and had to work silently in order to avoid alerting the quarry.
Marquesan Dog		Introduced to the Marquesas by the ancestors of the Polynesian people during their migrations.
Mexican lapdog		One of the smallest of all dog breeds.
Molossus		Large dogs kept in the ancient kingdom of Molossis in the region of Epirus; it is claimed that they are the progenitors of the mastiffs.
Moscow Water Dog		The Moscow Water Dog, also known as the Moscow Diver, Moscow Retriever or Moskovsky Vodolaz; derived in the U.S.S.R. from the Newfoundland, Caucasian Shepherd Dog and East European Shepherd.
Norfolk Spaniel		The term was used to designate springer-type spaniels that were neither Sussex nor Clumber Spaniels.
Norman Hound		A large breed of French scenthound from Normandy believed to be one of the ancestors of the Bloodhound; it became extinct in the 19th century as hunters switched to faster hound types.
North Country Beagle		A British medium-sized scenthound that was used to hunt hare, it was said to be smaller, with a sharper nose and faster than the contemporary Southern Hound; it is believed to be one of the foundation breeds of the modern English Foxhound.
Old Croatian Sighthound		A Croatian breed of sighthound used to course all forms of local game; they were known from the Middle Ages.
Old English Bulldog		A British breed of specialised small mastiff-type dogs developed from the 16th century for the blood sports of bull-baiting and dog fighting; the prohibition of most blood sports in 1835 saw the decline of the breed, although some were retained as companion dogs and were bred into the modern Bulldog.
Old Spanish Pointer		A breed of Spanish pointing dog known from the Early Modern Period; it is considered the first of its type from which all modern pointing dog breeds descend.
Old Welsh Grey Sheepdog		An extinct sheepdog breed native to Wales.
Paisley Terrier		A terrier breed from Scotland that was bred primarily as a pet and a show dog version of the Skye Terrier; it is considered to be the progenitor of the Yorkshire Terrier.
Polynesian Dog		A catch-all term for four breeds on this list: the Hawaiian Poi Dog, Kurī, Marquesan Dog and Tahitian Dog (see above and below).
Rache		A British type of hound in the Middle Ages, they were a fast-running scenthound used to drive game toward the waiting hunters.
Rastreador Brasileiro		A scenthound bred specifically to hunt jaguars; when jaguars became endangered and were protected, the breed's purpose became obsolete. The breed became extinct in 1973 and was later brought back through re-breeding.
Red Decoy Dog		An early English gundog used to lure waterfowl into large netted traps.
St John's water dog		A Canadian breed used by the fishermen of Newfoundland and Labrador; descended from imported European dogs brought to the New World on fishing vessels, it is considered to be the progenitor of the Labrador Retriever.
Salish Wool Dog		The Salish Wool Dog or Comox Dog is an extinct breed of white, long-haired, Spitz-type dog that was developed and bred by the Coast Salish peoples of what is now Washington state and British Columbia. It was raised for its hair, which was used like a sheep's wool.
Sleuth hound		A Scottish hound breed that assimilated into the modern Bloodhound.
Southern Hound		A British medium-sized scenthound that was used for hunting hare; a slow-paced, deep-scenting hound believed to be related to the Bloodhound, they became extinct towards the end of the 18th century when faster hounds became more popular for hare hunting.
Staghound		An English breed of scenthound that was used for stag hunting; developed in the Middle Ages, they effectively became extinct when the last pack was sold to Germany in 1826.
Tahitian Dog		A small breed that played an important role in indigenous Tahitian society.
Tahltan Bear Dog		A breed of dog that came to Canada in early migrations and acclimatised to the environment. It was developed by the Tahltan people.
Talbot Hound		A British small to medium-sized white scenthound known from the Late Middle Ages; famed for its scenting ability, it was often employed pursuing criminals; it is believed to be a progenitor of the Bloodhound.
Techichi		An ancestor of the modern Chihuahua.
Tesem		Ancient Egyptian dogs that are now extinct.
Toy Bulldog		A British breed that was a miniature version of the Bulldog, popular in the late Victorian era as a companion dog; it is considered to be the progenitor of the French Bulldog (which surpassed it in popularity) and the last record of it was in 1914.
Toy Trawler Spaniel		A breed similar to the King Charles Spaniel.
Turnspit dog		A British dog type used in larger kitchens to run in a wheel that turned a rotisserie; these short-legged dogs were known from the Middle Ages, they likely became extinct in the 19th century.
Tweed Water Spaniel		A British breed of gundog from the Anglo-Scottish border region; it was used by wildfowlers and is considered to be a progenitor of the Golden Retriever.
Welsh Hillman		A British breed of herding dog from Wales.
