= West Country Harrier =

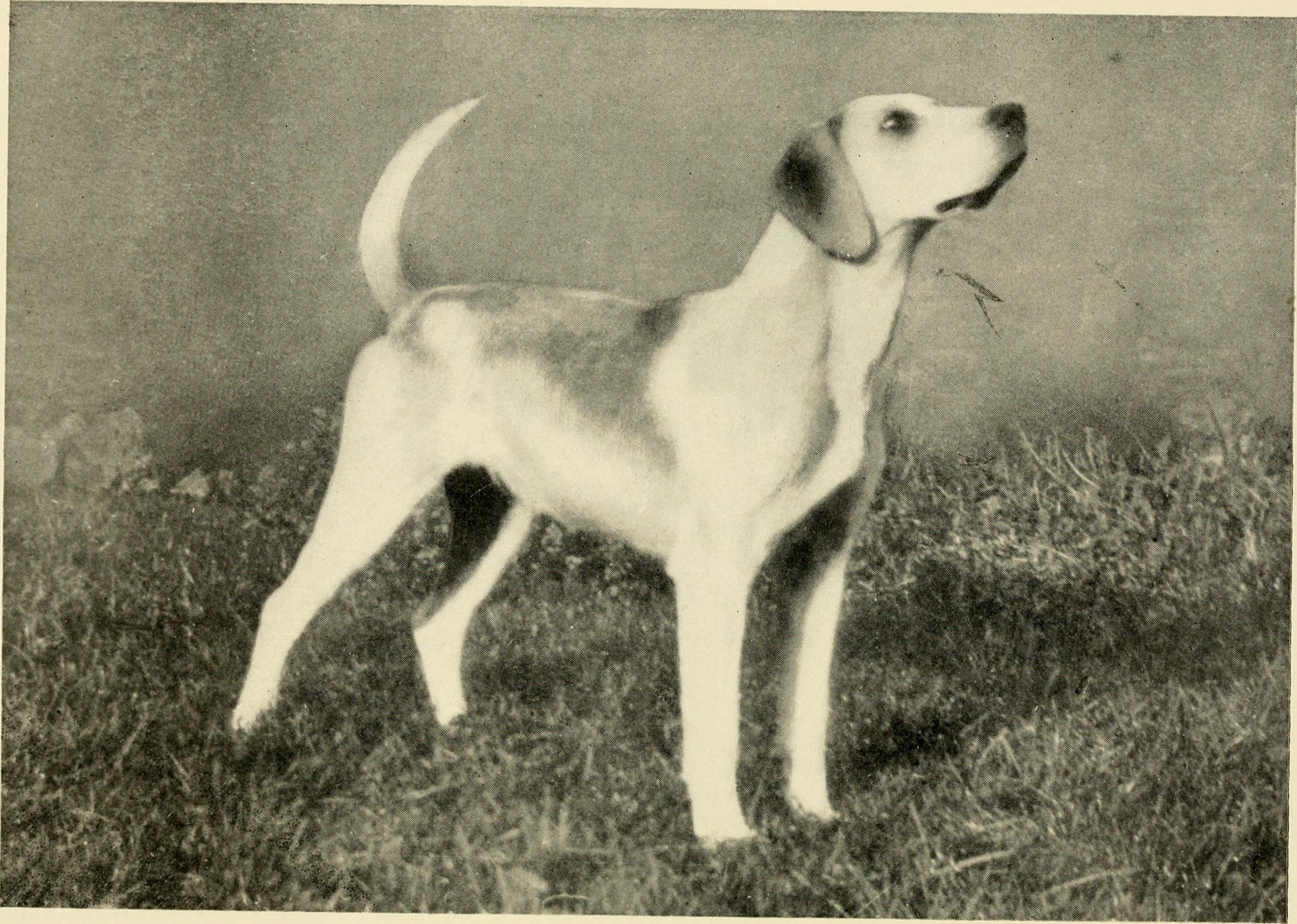
- West Country Harrier of the Quarme pack, 1905.
- Other names: Somerset Harrier
- Origin: England
- Breed status: Not recognised as a breed by any major kennel club.
Traits
- Coat: Short
- Colour: Predominantly white with cream or yellow markings

The West Country Harrier, sometimes called Somerset Harrier, is a breed of scent hound from the south west of England that is used to hunt hare in packs. The West Country Harrier is often considered to be a variety of the more common Harrier breed, which is sometimes referred to as the Studbook Harrier.

== History ==
The Harrier has been known in England from at least the 13th century, although some have claimed the breed was introduced into England by the Romans. The old Harrier was a slow moving, deep scenting hound breed that was closely related to the Southern Hound, and the hunts were traditionally followed on foot. From the 19th century, significant Foxhound blood was introduced into most Harrier packs, or frequently packs adopted pure Foxhound lines that were slightly bred down in size. This change was to produce faster hounds, and hare hunts began to be followed on horseback in a similar manner as fox hunting.

It is believed the West Country Harrier is more closely related to the old Harrier breed, without significant infusions of Foxhound blood. Parson Jack Russell described the West Country Harrier as being descended from the old style Harrier and the now extinct Staghound, the latter having been introduced by several enthusiasts including Parson John Froude. The breed was developed in, and is most frequently found in the English counties of Devon and Somerset, they are sometimes called Somerset Harriers although the name West Country Harriers is preferred.

The West Country Harrier is not recognised as a separate breed by the Kennel Club in the United Kingdom, but the country's official body for the governance of Harrier packs, the Association of Masters of Harriers and Beagles, maintains a separate studbook for the West Country Harrier.

As of 2023 there are 5 packs of West Country Harriers in the UK - with a population of around 300 dogs.

The West Country Harriers can be found only in the UK.

== Characteristics ==
Physically when compared to the Studbook Harrier, the West Country Harrier tends to be bigger and lighter in colour, being predominantly white with patches of cream or lemon markings. The West Country Harrier is said to lack some of the speed and drive of the Studbook Harrier, but it is claimed they have superior scenting abilities and more appealing voices.

== See also ==
- List of dog breeds
