= Dalbo dog =

Dalbohund
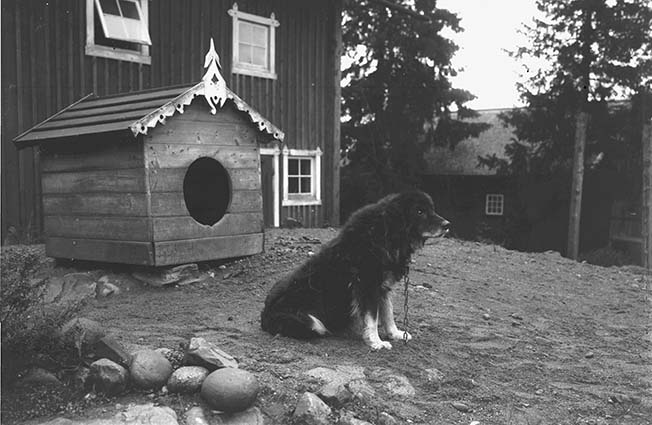
- Other names: Dalbo hound
- Common nicknames: Dalbo dog
- Origin: Sweden
- Variety status: Extinct. Not recognized as a breed by any major kennel club.

The Dalbo dog (Dalbohund) or Dalsland Mastiff is an extinct livestock guardian dog breed from Sweden.

== History ==
From the Icelandic Sagas, there are indications to suggest that the Vikings had acquired large cattle/guard/war dogs from their invasion of Britain. In Njals Saga, the Viking "Gunnar from Hlidarende" is given a large Irish Wolfhound as a gift. In Olaf Tryggvasson's Saga "Heimskringla", there is a mention of his dog, and it seems to have been a very large herding dog. There is a preserved large brown skin of a Dalbo dog in Hindås, Sweden. The skin clearly shows livestock guardian-type characteristics. There are some photos and paintings that might show the breed. A stuffed dog at the Natural History Museum in Stockholm was thought to have been a Dalbo dog, but it proved in fact to be an English Mastiff.

The first time the breed is mentioned is in Gunno Brynolphi Blutherus' (*1609-+1657) book Dalia printed in 1632 AD. The breed got its name in print again in 1843 AD, when Axel Emanuel Holmberg (*1817-+1861) published his book "Bohusläns Historia och Beskrifning", or "Bohuslän's History and Description." Oral history of the breed dates back to around A.D. 1700.

The stories that remain tell of a legendary giant dog who killed wolves, took on marauding brown bears, and defended small children who had got lost in the deep Swedish forests. There are also stories of Dalbo dogs who fought to the death saving humans from wolfpacks. One local priest claimed in A.D. 1833 that his "Dalbo dog has a bite of a crocodile" in his diary.

== Description ==
The Dalbo dog was a large, heavy dog with a long furry coat. The shoulder height for males was reported to have been 80 cm. Their fur was brown or dark, and some individuals were reported to have big white fur patches much like a St. Bernard dog. It has been said that the Dalbo dog closely resembled the living Portuguese breed of Cão da Serra da estrela. Others claim it was more like the modern day Leonberger, Hovawart or the English Mastiff.

== Temperament ==
The Dalbo dog was noted for its courage and bold nature.

== Extinction ==
The Dalbo dog was largely used to protect free-roaming cattle, sheep, horses, and goats from wolves, brown bears, and cattle thieves. It was also used to herd cattle and as a protection/guard dog. It became extinct around 1870. No dogs of this breed were found when an inventory was done in 1913. This breed was never common in Sweden, but it did occur in the following Swedish counties: Västergötland, Bohuslän, Dalsland, Värmland and the Norwegian county of Östfold. The extinction of the Dalbo dog is linked to the nearby wipeout of wolves and bears in Scandinavia in around 1890. It was then considered too expensive to continue to have large dogs that did not seem to fill a clear purpose. An ill-fated outbreak of rabies in 1854 might have contributed to the downfall of the breed. Another reason might have been the great Swedish famine of 1867-1868.

== See also ==
- List of dog breeds
- List of extinct dog breeds
