= Buckhound =

Breed of dog

- The New Forest Buckhounds, 1896

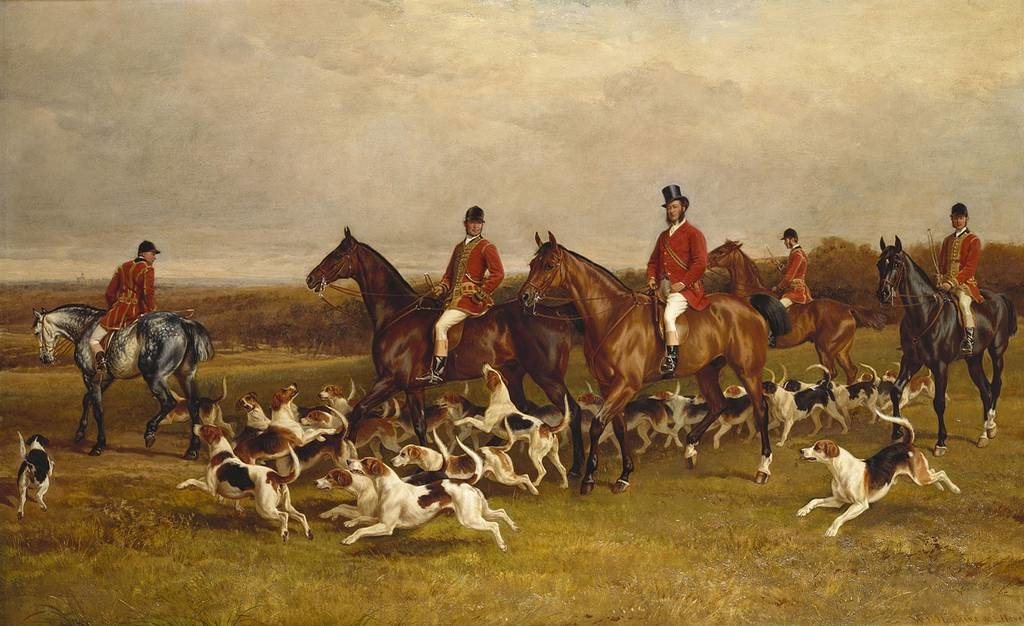
- The Royal Buckhounds, 1875
- Origin: England
- Breed status: Extinct

The Buckhound was a breed of scent hound from England; they were used to hunt fallow deer in packs.

== History ==
From the Middle Ages, the hunting of deer in England varied depending on whether the quarry was the large stag or red deer or the smaller buck or fallow deer. The use of different hounds for the hunting of different deer species was known from at least the reign of Henry III (1216–1272), with packs of Staghounds maintained for the hunting of stag, whilst the hunting of the smaller buck was conducted with packs of Buckhounds. By the 15th century, stag hunts and buck hunts had diverged significantly; during a stag hunt, stag were tracked and located using limers and then hunted using the deep-scenting Staghounds, whereas buck hunts were more of a fast-paced par-force hunt, with the hounds hunting by both sight and scent, and emphasis being placed on the pace of the hunt.

Buck hunting held a special place in England during the reign of Edward III (1327–1377) when the Royal Buckhounds pack was established and the title Master of the Buckhounds was allocated to the Brocas family. The English and later British monarchs maintained the Royal Buckhounds until the 20th century. When Queen Anne became too infirm to follow the hounds on horseback, she had paths cut through Windsor Forest so she could follow the hunt in a carriage.

Due to scarcity of deer to hunt, by the time of George III's reign (1760–1820), the Royal Buckhounds was one of the few remaining Buckhound packs in England. Buck hunts became hunts for carted deer. A semi-tame deer was released and hunted by the hounds and accompanying riders, but the hounds were prevented from harming the deer, which was recaptured and returned to its deer park unharmed to be hunted again later.

In 1868 the hounds ran through Wormwood Scrubs and the hunt ended at Paddington Goods Station. The Prince of Wales rode home to Marlborough House wearing his pink coat. Queen Victoria appeared as a spectator at only one meet of the Queen's Hounds in 1874. Until 1878 the Prince of Wales hunted fairly regularly with the Buckhounds. However, there was talk of abolishing the Buckhounds and turning them into a royal fox hunt. Reverend Joseph Stratton spearheaded the humanitarian campaign against the Buckhounds in 1852. He worked tirelessly, walking ten or twenty miles a day, to expose the hunting of the carted deer as a "spurious" sport.

Eventually, in 1901, the pack was dissolved as a cost-saving measure by Edward VII. Buck hunting was subsumed by stag hunting and Buckhounds died out.

== Description ==
Artistic depictions show that the Buckhound's appearance was quite similar to that of the Harrier, a hound used for hare hunting in packs, being noticeably smaller and lighter-framed than the Staghound. Richard Barrett Davis described Buckhounds in this way: "The buck-hound, in the days of George III, was tall, loose and ill put together, with a well formed head and large ears, not rounded: its colour was yellow pie, more in spots than is usual in hounds. Its pace for half an hour was very fast; after the first stop there was little difficulty in keeping up with them."

== See also ==
- List of dog breeds
- List of extinct dog breeds
