= P & R Ginger Jo R =

American Foxhound (1973)

P & R Ginger Jo R with owner Jacob "Jackie" Ryals and her 1976 trophies

P & R Ginger Jo R (I.F.S.B. No. 127252; whelped 18 November 1973) was an American Foxhound owned and handled by Jacob “Jackie” Ryals of McRae, Georgia. In 1976 she won the United States Open (U.S.O.) and the National Field Trial Championship. The Chase and The Lumber City Log described those two titles, won in the same year, as unmatched in the sport. She remains the only foxhound, male or female, to win both events in the same calendar year.

== Early life and background ==
Ginger Jo R was whelped on 18 November 1973. She was sired by Va. Ch. Allegany Ringo and out of Pittman Snow Bird. She was produced through a collaborative breeding program between Dr. C.W. Pittman, a veterinarian from Raleigh, North Carolina, and Ryals. Ryals took the pick of the litter and raised her at his kennels in McRae.

The Chase quoted Ryals as saying she was “the sorriest looking little female you ever saw, but when she was turned loose at six months with older hounds that would not run a deer, she took right to foxhunting. At nine months of age she could hold her own with the other packs".

== Competitive career ==
At fifteen months age she was loaned to E. M. Cannon for the Mid-South Open and was scratched for running a deer.[2]

At the Western Hills field trial she did not have a score going into the last day, then came from behind to be crowned Western Hill Dual Champion.

In 1976 Ginger Jo R won the National Field Trial Championship at Panama City, Florida. Contemporary reports noted that over 600 hounds were entered in the National event. The Chase said she finished first in hunting, trailing, speed and drive, and endurance.

The Lumber City Log reported that the National win brought eight trophies, including challenge trophies, the Jasper Maupin Memorial Trophy, and the James Trophy.

In December of the same calendar year, she was entered into the U.S. Open Field Trial in Laurinburg, North Carolina. Despite freezing temperatures and frozen ground during the first two days of the event, she outperformed 353 other hounds to capture the High General Average (HGA) title and secure the U.S.O. championship. With this victory, she became the only hound in history to win both the National and the U.S. Open in the same calendar year.

== Sale and Later Life ==
In February 1977, Paul May, a retired tobacco manufacturer from Burlington, North Carolina, purchased Ginger Jo R for $10,000, setting a record at the time for a field trial hound. In 1978, she returned to the Ryals Kennels in McRae. She was retired from field trial competition to be used for breeding with notable studs at the Ryals Kennels.

Jackie's Kennels produced other champion hounds, including Jackie's Scout, winner of the 1980 National Field Trial Championship. Ryals and that hound appeared on the cover of The Chase.

== Burial ==
She is buried at the National Hall of Fame Cemetery of Fox Hounds at Boles Field in the Sabine National Forest, Shelby County, Texas. The headstone lists Western Hill Dual Champion, National Champion, and U.S.O. Champion.
