= American Foxhound =

American hunting dog with keen sense of smell

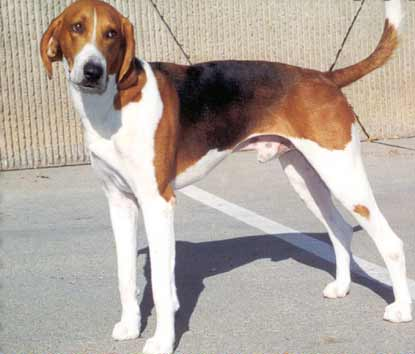
- American Foxhound
- Common nicknames: Foxhound
- Origin: United States
Traits
Height	Males	21–25 in (53–64 cm)
Weight	Males	55–71 lb (25–32 kg)
- Coat: Short, hard
- Color: red, tricolor, black and tan, blue
- Litter size: 5-7 puppies
Kennel club standards
- American Kennel Club: standard
- Fédération Cynologique Internationale: standard
- Notes: State dog of Virginia

The American Foxhound is a breed of dog, closely related to the English Foxhound. They are scent hounds, bred to hunt foxes by scent. United States Founding Father George Washington was key to the breed's early development.

== History ==
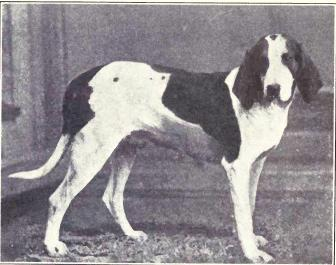
American Foxhound circa 1915

In 1650, Robert Brooke sailed from England to Maryland with his pack of hunting dogs, which were the root of several strains of American hounds. Dogs of this bloodline, known as "Brooke Hounds," remained in the Brooke family for nearly 300 years, possibly one of the longest documented breeding records for a single breed and family.

The American Kennel Club credits George Washington as the Father of the American Foxhound. Washington is said to have had a strong love for dogs that grew from his love of hunting for foxes. Washington bred the American Foxhound in hopes of breeding faster speed and tracking of foxes into the breed of hounds he already owned. He received French Foxhounds, Grand Bleu de Gascogne, (which look much like an American Bluetick Coonhound) as a gift from the Marquis de Lafayette. Around two years later, Washington acquired eight regular hounds from Philadelphia, Pennsylvania and two “Slow Pace” hounds from England. The combination of those dogs, the French Foxhounds, and the dogs Washington kept, which were descended from Brooke's, create the present-day American Foxhound.

The American Foxhound originated in the states of Maryland and Virginia, where Washington lived, and is the state dog of Virginia.

The breed was developed purely for hunting foxes. With the importation (or migration) of the red fox, Irish Foxhounds were added to the lines, to increase speed and stamina in the dog, qualities still prevalent in today's dogs.

The breed was first recognized by the American Kennel Club in 1886. Today, there are many different strains of American Foxhound, including Walker, Calhoun, Goodman, Trigg, July, and Penn-Marydel. Though each strain looks different, they are all recognized as members of the same breed. Most show hounds are Walkers, many of the pack hounds (used with hunting foxes on horseback) are Penn-Marydel, and hunters use a variety of strains to suit their hunting style and quarry.

Notable individual members of the breed include P & R Ginger Jo R, who in 1976 became the only foxhound in history to win both the United States Open and the National Field Trial Championship in the same calendar year.

== Description ==
=== Appearance ===
While standards call for the American Foxhound to be about 21–25 in (53–64 cm) tall to the withers, and weigh anywhere between 55–71 lb (25–32 kg), many of them are larger in structure (especially the show strains), with males standing 26–29 in (66–74 cm) and females 25–28 in (64–71 cm) and smaller in weight, typically between 45–65 lb (20–29 kg). The legs of a Foxhound are long and straight-boned. The foxhound's chest is rather narrow. It has a long muzzle, and a large, domed skull. The ears are wide and low-set. The eyes are hazel or brown, and are large and wide-set.

=== Coat ===
A close, hard hound coat of medium length, and any color, though the combination of black, white, and tan is prevalent. American Foxhounds do tend to shed a good amount of hair, but a weekly brushing will decrease shedding.

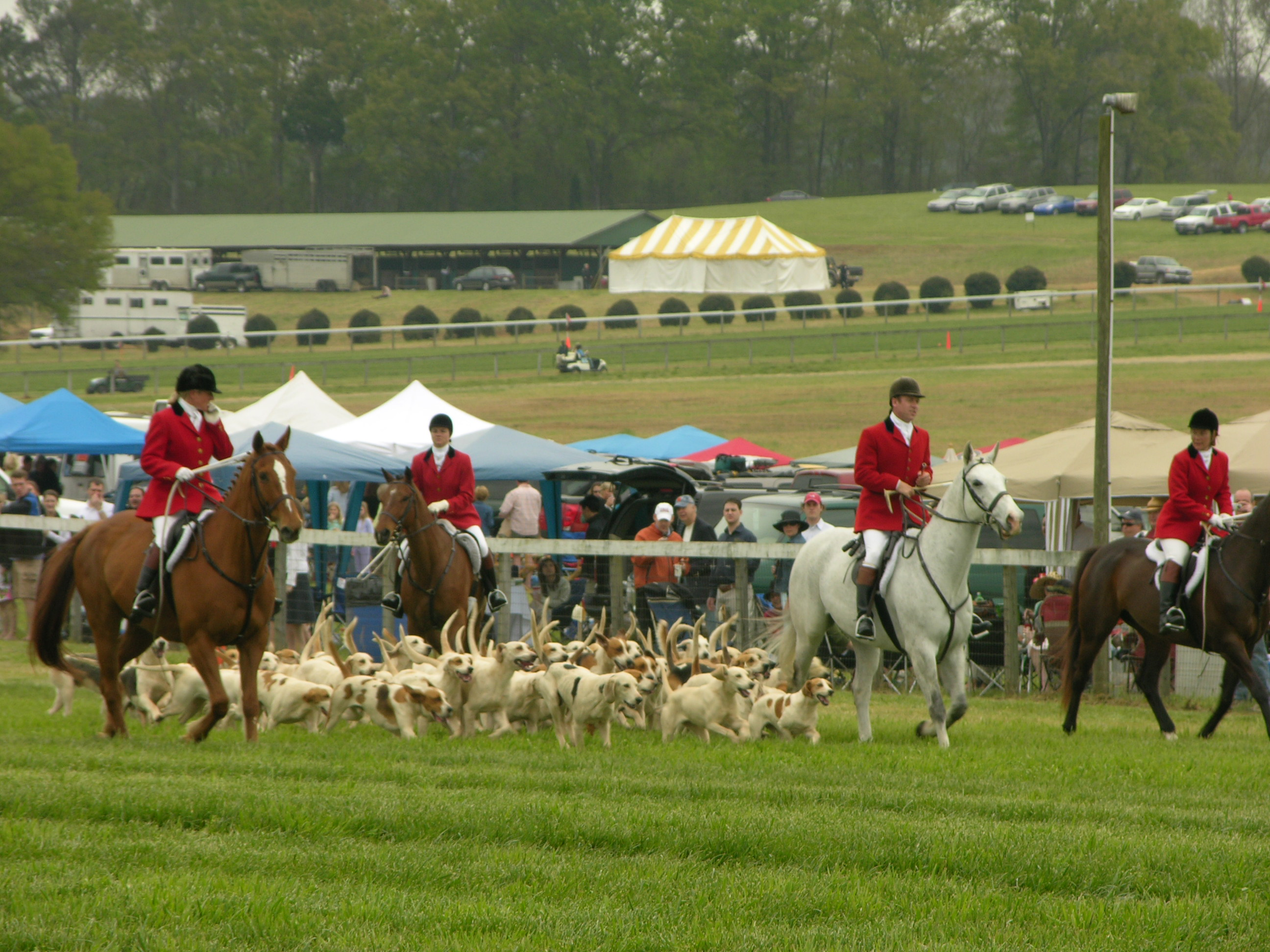
American Foxhounds at the Atlanta Steeplechase

=== Defining physical characteristics ===
The American Foxhound is known to have a musical bark, called a bay, when it is hunting that can be heard for miles, probably inherited from the Grand Bleu de Gascogne's signature howl. This is one reason why this breed does not do well in city settings.

The American Foxhound is taller and rangier than its cousin, the English Foxhound. If competing in a dog show, some physical characteristics that judges would look for would be a slightly domed skull, long, large ears, large eyes, straight muzzle, well laid-back shoulders, a moderately long back, fox-like feet, and a slightly curved tail. Though they are traditionally tri-colored (black, white, and tan) they can be any color. They are one of the rarest breeds in the American Kennel Club.

== Behavior ==
=== Temperament ===
The American Foxhound typically has a calm temperament and generally gets along with children and other animals.

=== Activity level ===
The American Foxhound is a very active breed with very high energy. With longer legs bred into them, they are a very fast dog. They require a lot of exercise and do best in habitats where they have room to run.

=== Trainability ===
Obedience training is essential for this breed due to their independence and natural instinct to follow a scent. A Foxhound that picks up a scent will follow it while ignoring commands; training requires patience and skill because of the breed's independence and occasional stubbornness. Because of its strong hunting instinct, American Foxhounds should not be trusted off-leash. Most scent hounds are bred to give "voice," but the Foxhound does not make a good watchdog.

== Health ==
This breed does not generally carry genetic disorders. However they can easily become overweight when overfed. A minor health risk in American Foxhounds is thrombocytopathy, or platelet disease. This comes from poorly functioning blood platelets and can result in excessive bleeding from minor bumps or cuts. The treatment is usually based on the severity of the disease. Owners will often have their American Foxhounds undergo blood tests so that the condition can be caught early on. While dysplasia was largely unknown in Foxhounds, it is beginning to crop up occasionally, along with some eye issues. It is not typical or customary for Foxhound breeders to screen for any hereditary disorders at this time. The breed's lifespan is generally 10–12 years.

== Trigg Hound ==
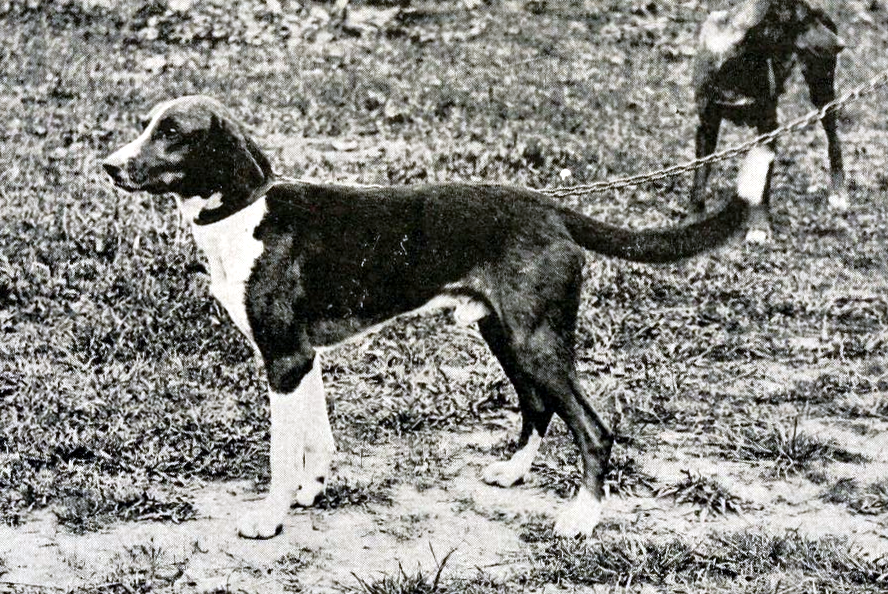
Male Trigg Hound

The Trigg Hound (also known as the Trigg Foxhound or Hayden Trigg Hound) is a variety of the American Foxhound, developed in Kentucky by Colonel Haiden Trigg.

The Trigg Hound originated in Barren County, Kentucky, in the 1860s, when fox hunting enthusiast Colonel Haiden C. Trigg wanted to develop a faster hound than those available in his area. He used dogs from the Birdsong, Maupin, and Walker lines to develop his strain.

According to W. L. Porter in an article in The Chase, local fox hunters who saw the dogs purchased from Birdsong found them unattractive, but their performance was surprisingly good. Porter stated that the dogs were "racy built, crop ears, rough coated, bushy tails and chop mouthed and looked unlike any fox hound any of us had ever seen". Eventually, Trigg's breeding program became successful on a local and national level.

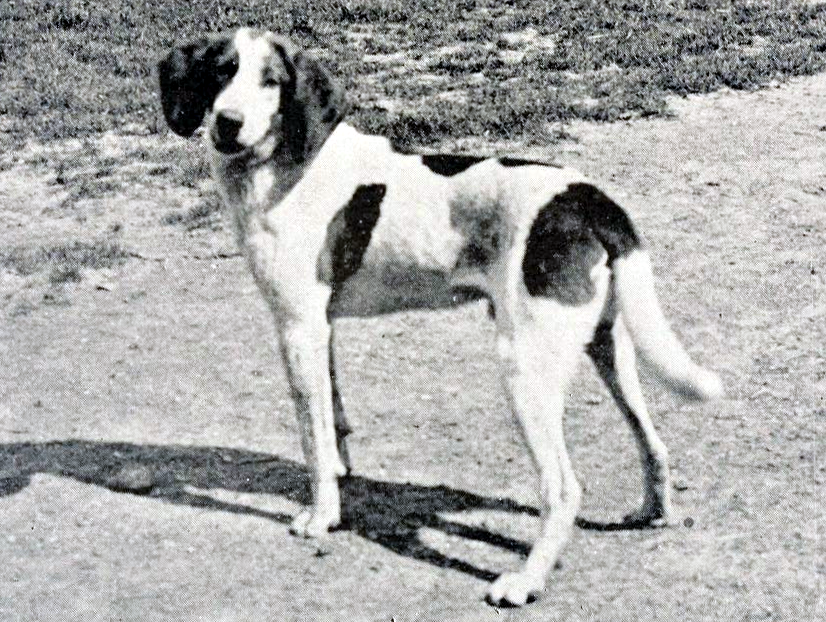
Early Trigg Hound

In 1910, well-known big-game hunter Paul J. Rainey purchased twenty five hounds from Trigg and took them on a hunting trip in Africa, later buying more from Trigg, his son Alanson, and others. After Trigg's death, some fanciers began to lose interest and the strain declined in popularity, despite a small core of active breeders. After Rainey returned from his trips, however, he announced that the Triggs were the "best and most courageous hounds in the world," causing their popularity to rise again amongst hunters.

Male Trigg Hounds stand 23 to 24 inches (58 to 61 centimeters) at the withers and weigh 45 to 55 pounds (20 to 25 kilograms), while females stand 20 to 22 inches (51 to 56 centimeters) and weigh 35 to 45 pounds (16 to 20 kilograms). The variety has a long snout, hanging ears, and a short, smooth coat, and though it may come in any color, the Continental Kennel Club allows only tricolor and bicolor dogs. The Trigg Hound is obedient but "tenacious", and is well-suited to hunting because of its sense of smell and endurance.

== See also ==
- List of dog breeds
- English Foxhound
