= Cumberland Sheepdog =

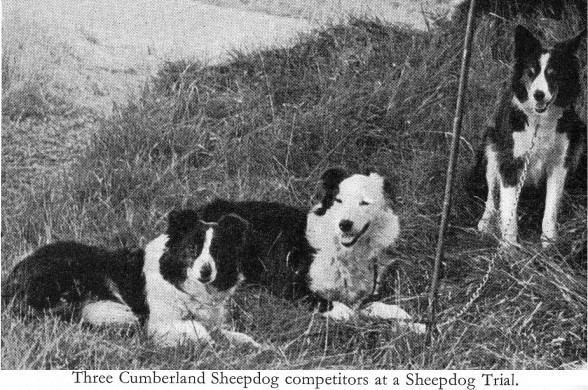
- Breed status: Extinct

The Cumberland Sheepdog was a breed of collie from the North of England. Closely related to the Border Collie, the Cumberland Sheepdog is believed to be extinct.

== History ==
The Cumberland Sheepdog was a local breed of collie found throughout Cumberland, Westmorland and the Peak District, the breed was known in its native counties for centuries, but remained relatively unknown elsewhere.

In the late 19th and early 20th centuries Cumberland Sheepdogs were regular competitors in and frequent winners of local sheepdog trials. The 5th Earl of Lonsdale was an admirer of the Cumberland Sheepdog, and in the late 19th century attempted to save the breed from extinction. In 1899 he outcrossed the breed German Shepherds to save them from inbreeding, however in the mid 20th century he disbanded his kennels and after that the numbers quickly dwindled.

No effort was ever made to gain kennel club recognition for the Cumberland Sheepdog, and today the breed is considered extinct.

It is sometimes claimed that the Cumberland Sheepdog was one of the progenitors of the Australian Shepherd.

== Description ==
The Cumberland Sheepdog was variously described as resembling the Welsh Sheepdogs, old working collies, heavy-set Border Collies and even Bearded Collies. The breed stood approximately 20 in (51 cm) at the shoulder and weighted between 40–50 lb (18–23 kg), their body was fairly long and extremely lithe, with light but muscular legs and a low-set tail carried at the trail. They was black and white in colour, had an unusually heavy, dense and weatherproof coat, and a bushy tail. They had a rather broad and flat, tapering to a medium-length muzzle and ears that fell over to the front or were semi-erect and rather small.

When working, it was said they worked quietly, quickly and low-to-ground.

== See also ==
- List of dog breeds
- List of extinct dog breeds
