= List of dog breeds originating from Wales =

List of Welsh dog breeds

The Kennel Club (KC), the United Kingdom's official kennel club, recognises over 200 pedigree dog breeds. This list includes dog breeds that are generally considered to have originated in Wales, some of which are also recognised by other major kennel clubs and organisations such as the Fédération Cynologique Internationale (FCI). Breeds are included if reputable sources describe them as originating in Wales, extinct breeds and unrecognised local types are also listed where documented.

Name	Other names used	Recognition	Place of origin (within Wales)	Notes	Image
Black and Tan Terrier	Old English Black and Tan Terrier Broken Coated Working Terrier Rough Coated Black and Tan Terrier Old Working Terrier Old English Terrier		Wales and England	Extinct	
Cardigan Welsh Corgi	Cardigan CWC Cardi	KC FCI	Ceredigion		
Old Welsh Grey Sheepdog	Welsh Grey Old Welsh Grey			Extinct The Patagonian Sheepdog is in part a descendant from this breed	
Pembroke Welsh Corgi	Corgi Welsh Corgi Pembroke	KC FCI	Pembrokeshire		
Sealyham Terrier	Welsh Border Terrier Cowley Terrier	KC FCI	Sealyham House, Pembrokeshire		
Welsh Hillman				Extinct	
Welsh Hound					
Welsh Sheepdog					
Welsh Springer Spaniel	Welsh Springer Welsh Starter Welshie	KC FCI			
Welsh Terrier	Welshie WT	KC FCI			

== See also ==
- List of dog breeds
- List of dog breeds originating from Scotland
- List of dog breeds originating from England
