= Lapponian Shepherd =

Extinct breed of dog

The Lapponian Shepherd (Finnish: Lapinpaimenkoira [ˈlɑpimˌpɑi̯meŋˌkoi̯rɑ]) or Cockhill's Finnish Lapphound (Kukonharjunkoira) is an extinct dog breed originating from Finland. Despite its name, it did not come from Lapland, but from the southern parts of the country.

== Etymology ==
The name Lapinpaimenkoira ("Lapponian Shepherd") refers to the fact that the ancestors of this breed came from Lapland. During the 1950s to the 1970s, Kukonharjun Kennel was one of the most remarkable breeders and this is where this breed or variety received its second name Kukonharjunkoira (literally "Cockhill's Dog", but referred to by Desmond Morris as "Cockhill's Finnish Lapphound").

== History ==
In the 1930s, Lapponian reindeer-herding dogs – namely the Finnish Lapphund – were taken to southern Finland and crossed with the long-haired Karelian Bear Dog. This is how a new breed called Cockhill's Finnish Lapphound was developed and in 1945, it was officially registered as the Lapponian Shepherd. However, the Finnish Lapphund and the Lapponian Herder were soon added under the same breed name and, therefore, all three of these breeds began to cross with each other.

In 1967, the Finnish Kennel Club (the Suomen Kennelliitto) decided to split the Lapponian Shepherd breed into two separate breeds called the Finnish Lapphund and the Lapponian Herder. They did not take Cockhill's Finnish Lapphound into account and in the beginning of the 1980s, it finally vanished due to the popularity of the Finnish Lapphund. However, it can still be found behind the bloodlines of today's Finnish Lapphunds.
