= Red Decoy Dog =

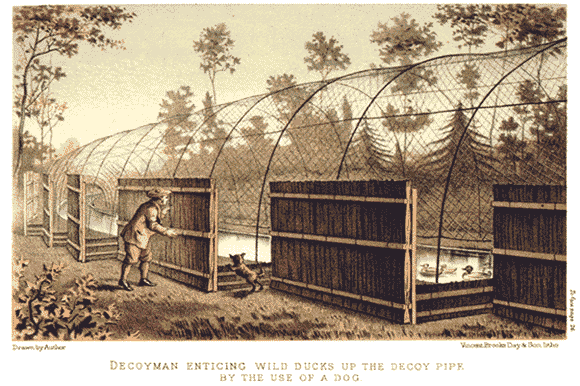
- Other names: Decoy Dog
- Origin: England
- Breed status: Extinct
Traits
- Colour: Red or yellow

The Red Decoy Dog, also known as the Decoy Dog, was a now extinct breed of gundog from England. Used to lure waterfowl into large netted traps. The Red Decoy Dog is believed to be the progenitor of the Canadian Nova Scotia Duck Tolling Retriever.

== Overview ==
Prior to the proliferation of firearms, a common method of capturing ducks in England was by enticing them from a body of water into a large tunnel made from hoops covered in netting. Two methods existed to lure the ducks into the tunnels, one was to train live ducks, called decoys, to entice wild ducks onto their pond then to follow them into the tunnel. The second was to use a decoy dog to entice wild ducks to follow them into the tunnel.

These dogs were bred to look like foxes, as it had been observed that inquisitive ducks would often follow a fox behaving erratically. Through consistent breeding, at some point these dogs developed into a distinct breed, the Red Decoy Dog. In Holland, the very similar Kooikerhondje was bred for the same purpose.

The Red Decoy Dog was described as being small, fox-red or tawny coloured, and collie-like appearance with a distinct long, brushy tail. In his 1886 work The book of duck decoys, Sir Ralph Payne-Gallwey describes a good decoy dog as “a bright little fellow, about a third smaller than a Fox, with a curly bushy tail if possible, and of red or yellow colour.” The breed seems to have been found principally in The Fens.

It is unknown when the Red Decoy Dog became extinct, it is considered likely their popularity declined with the proliferation of shooting, when wildfowlers replaced their nets with shotguns to hunt waterfowl. Although it does appear they were used as gundogs by early shooters. The Nova Scotia Duck Tolling Retriever is believed to have descended from Red Decoy Dogs taken to Nova Scotia by early settlers. Some cynologists also believe Red Decoy Dogs were one of the ancestors of the Golden Retriever.

== See also ==
- List of extinct dog breeds
- Duck decoy
