= Hovawart =

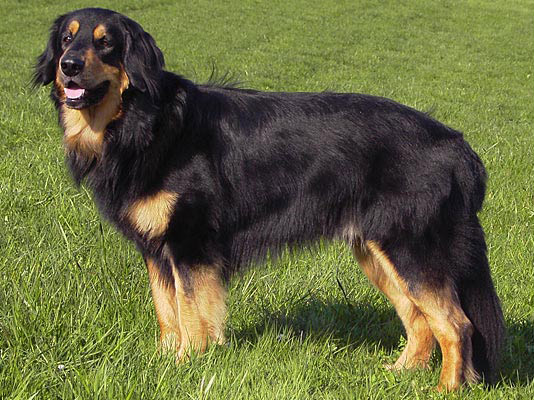
- Male Hovawart
- Common nicknames: Hovie
- Origin: Germany
Traits
Height	Males	63–73 cm (25–29 in)
	Females	58–65 cm (23–26 in)
- Weight: 30–50 kg (66–110 lb)
- Color: Black, black and gold, and blonde
Kennel club standards
- VDH: standard
- Fédération Cynologique Internationale: standard
- Notes: IHF - Internationale Hovawart Föderation

The Hovawart is a medium to large size German dog breed.

The name means "yard-watcher" or "farm-watcher", from the Middle High German words hova ("court", "yard", "farm", modern Standard German: Hof) and wart ("watchman", modern Standard German: Wart).

== Description ==
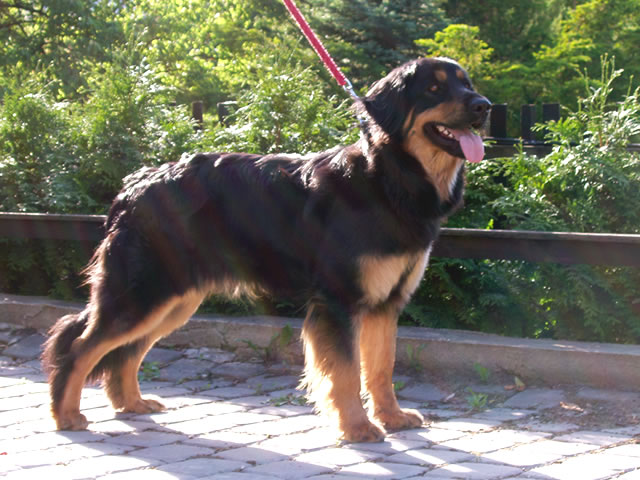
A black and gold Hovie. Black and gold is the most common colour of Hovawart.

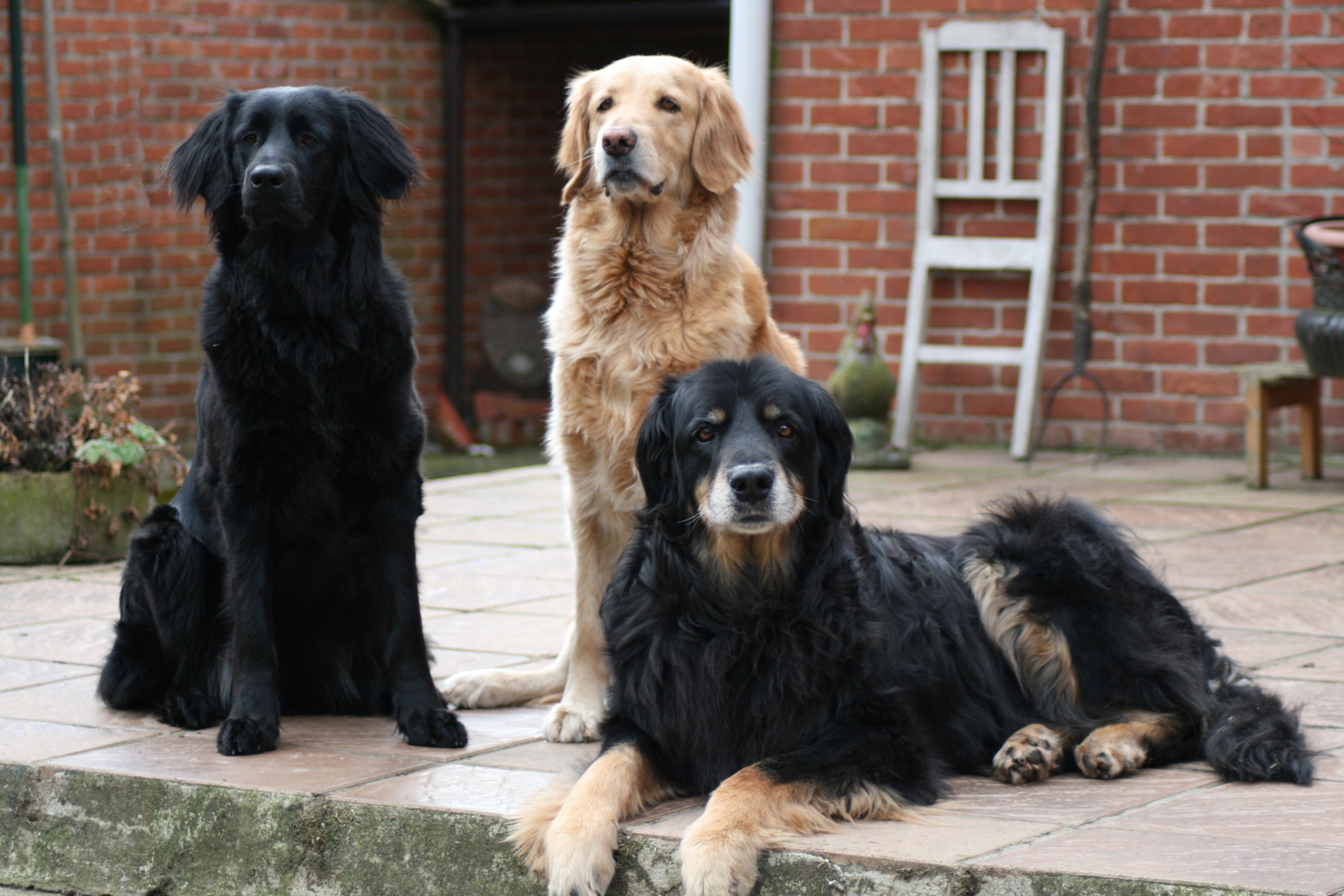
The three permitted colours

=== Appearance ===
The Hovawart is a muscular, medium sized, long-haired working breed. The breed is slightly long with length being between 110-115% of the height at withers.

==== Head ====
The bridge of the nose is straight. Muzzle is roughly the same length as the skull and the skin is tight. Facial pigmentation is black. Eyes are oval shaped with a dark-to-medium brown colour. Ears are triangular shaped and drop down. They should reach down far enough to be in line with the mouth.

==== Body ====
The tail reaches to the hocks but not the ground.

==== Coat ====
The long-haired coat lies close to the body with only a slight amount of undercoat. Coat is longer on the chest, belly, and rare of legs. There are three different colours: black, black and gold, and blonde.

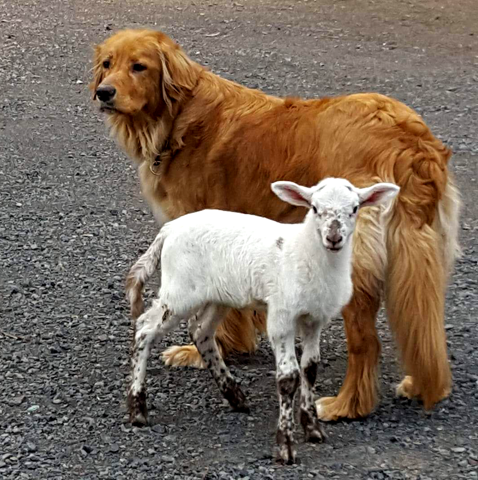
Hovawart at work

==== Size ====
Dogs are 63–70 cm (25–28 in) at the withers and bitches are 58–65 cm (23–26 in)

=== Personality ===
Hovawarts are protective dogs who can make good family pets when trained due to their guarding instincts and desire to be part of a pack.

== History ==
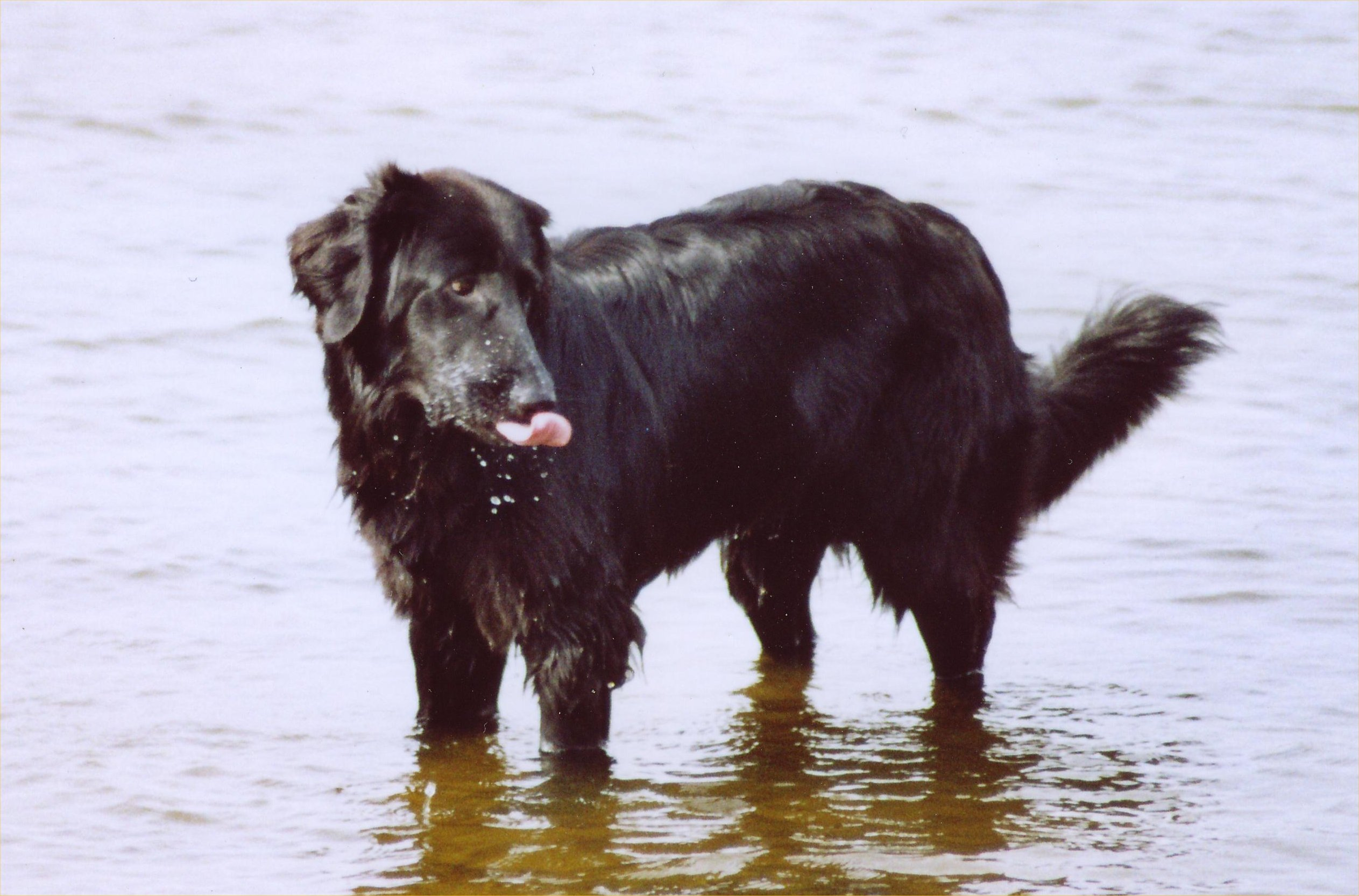
A black-colored Hovawart

Following the medieval period, the popularity of the Hovawart began to decline. Newer breeds such as the German Shepherd Dog slowly replaced the Hovawart as a guard and working dog until it had almost disappeared by the beginning of the twentieth century. Around 1915 a group of enthusiasts decided to try to save the breed. Predominant in this group was the zoologist Kurt Friedrich König. They started by looking for dogs in the farms of the Black Forest region. König then started a careful breeding program using these dogs and crossed them with Kuvasz specimens, Newfoundlands, German Shepherd Dogs, Leonbergers, a Bernese Mountain Dog and an African hunting dog. After much work, the group was rewarded in 1922 when the first Hovawart litter was entered into the German Breeding Registry. The enthusiasts continued their work and in 1937 the German Kennel Club officially recognised the Hovawart. All this work was almost undone with the outbreak of the Second World War. Because of their abilities many Hovawarts were used in the German war effort and perished. By 1945 only a few remained. Enthusiasm for the breed remained and in 1947, Otto Schramm and some fellow enthusiasts in Coburg formed a new club, the Rassezuchtverein für Hovawart-Hunde Coburg which is still in existence today. In 1964 the German Kennel Club recognised the Hovawart as the country's seventh working breed.

== Miscellaneous ==
The Hovawart is used in search and rescue, tracking and working dog activities.

== See also ==
- List of dog breeds
