= Richard Barrett Davis =

English painter (1782–1854)

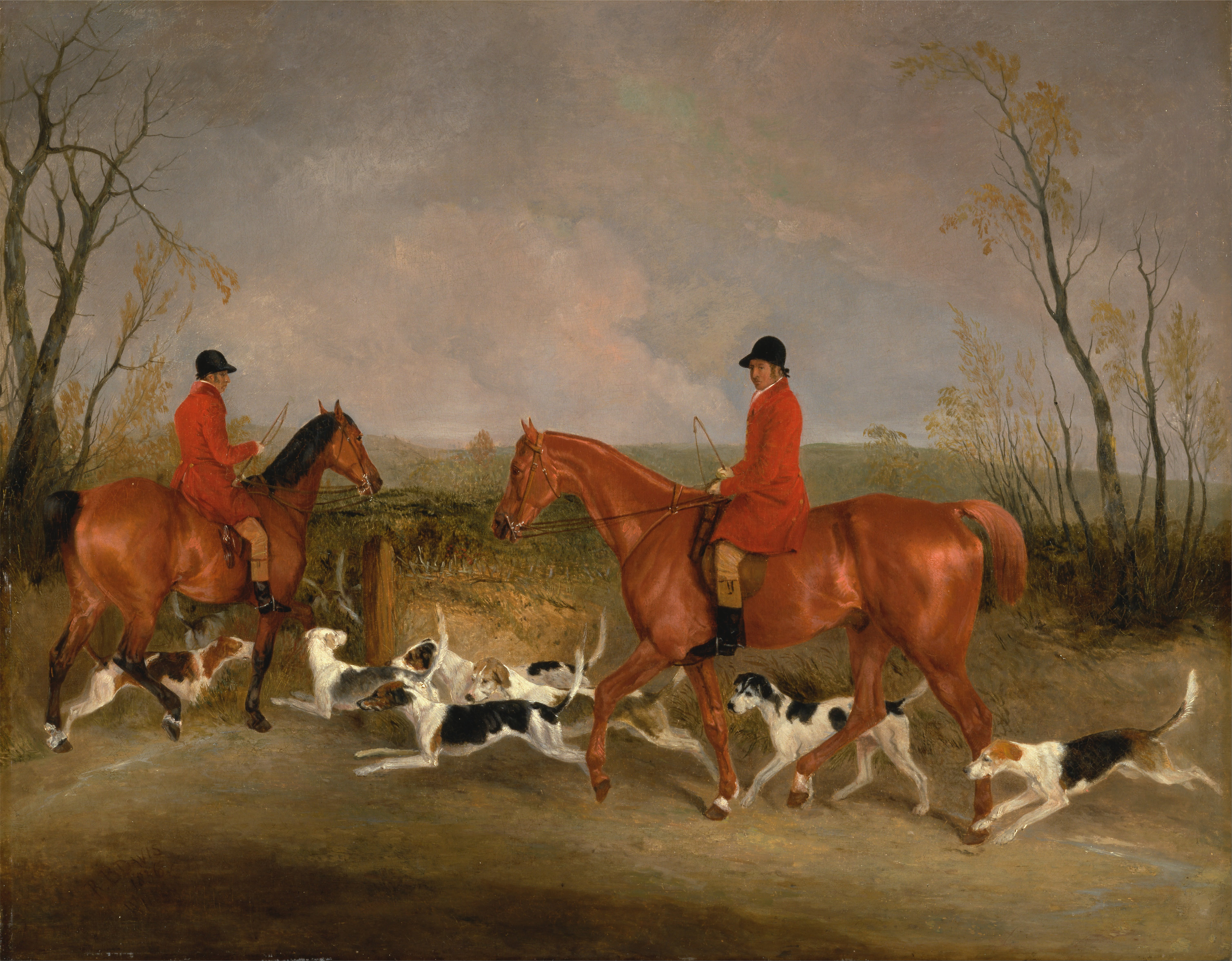
George Mountford, Huntsman to the Quorn, and W. Derry, Whipper-In, at John O'Gaunt's Gorse, near Melton Mowbray by Richard Barrett Davis, 1836.

Richard Barrett Davis RBA (1782–1854) was an animal and landscape painter.

Davis was born at Watford in 1782. He studied under William Evans of Eton, under William Beechey, and in the schools of the Royal Academy, where he first exhibited in 1802. He joined the Society of British Artists in 1829, and was appointed animal painter to William IV in 1831. He died in 1854. Amongst his works are:

- Mares and Foals from the Royal Stud, 1808
- Going to Market, 1814
- Horse Fair, 1821
- Travellers attacked by Wolves, 1831
- Near Virginia Water (South Kensington Museum)
