= Polish Lowland Sheepdog =

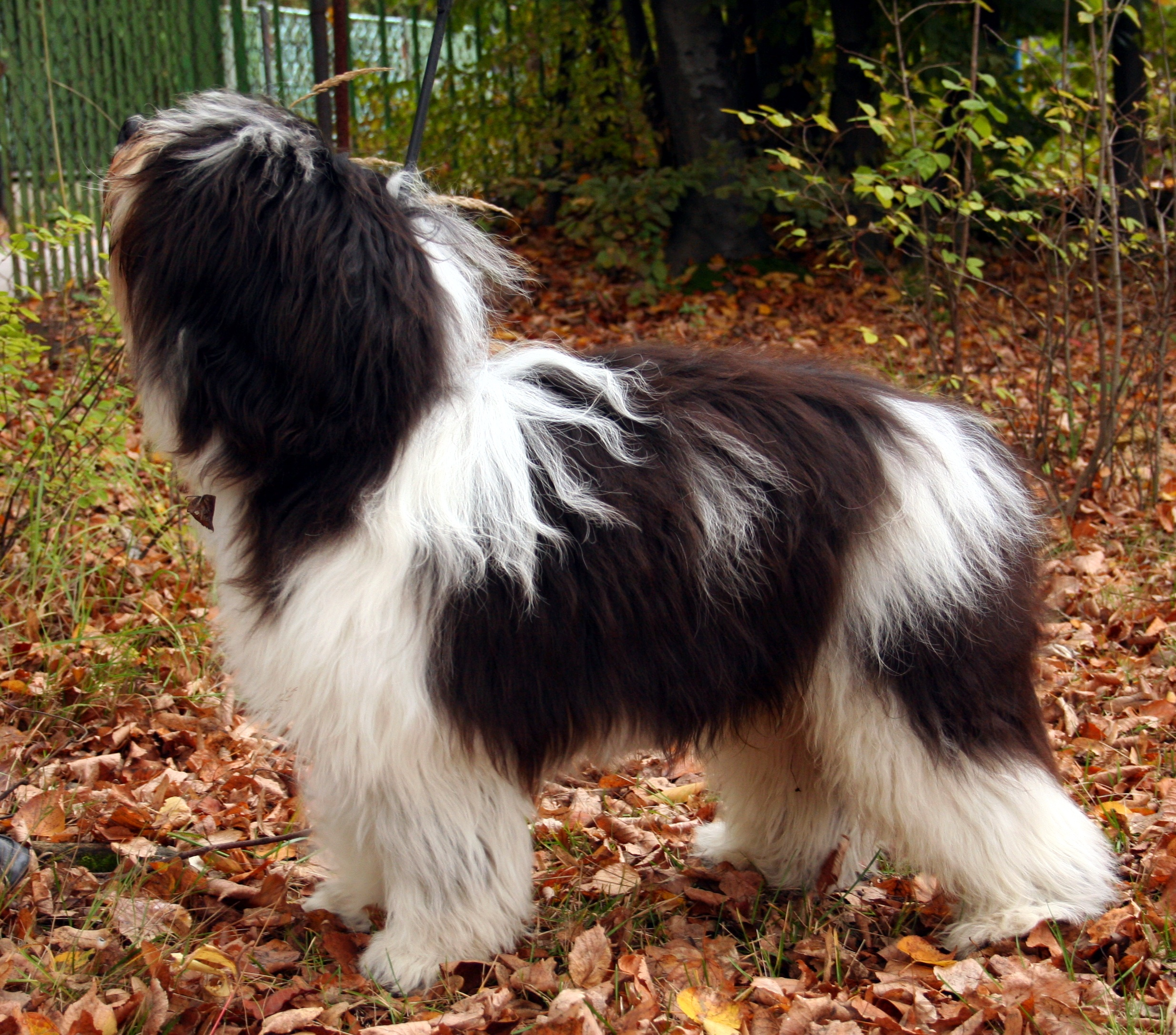
- Other names: Polski Owczarek Nizinny; Valee Sheepdog
- Common nicknames: PON; Nizinny; PLS
- Origin: Poland
Kennel club standards
- Fédération Cynologique Internationale: standard

The Polish Lowland Sheepdog (Polish: Polski Owczarek Nizinny, also PON), is a medium-sized, shaggy-coated, sheep dog breed native to Poland.

== Description ==
=== Appearance ===
The PON is a muscular, thick-coated dog. The double coat can be of any color or pattern; white, gray, and brown are most common, with black, gray, or brown markings. It is common for colors to fade as the dogs reach adulthood. The undercoat is soft and dense, while the topcoat is rough and either straight or wavy, but not curly. The hair around the head makes the head appear to be larger than it actually is, and typically covers the eyes.

Males are 45–50 cm (18–20 in) in height at the withers, while females are 42–47 cm (17–19 in). Males typically weigh between 40 – 50 lb, females, 30 – 40 lb. The body is just off square, it appears rectangular due to the abundance of coat on the chest and rear; the ratio of the height to the body length should be 9:10 (a 45 cm tall dog should have a body 50 cm long). The tail is either very short or docked in the United States. European countries have banned docking for the most part and many PONs now have tails of varying lengths.

=== Temperament ===
Polish Lowland Sheepdogs are stable and self-confident. They have an excellent memory and can be well trained, but may dominate a weak-willed owner. PONs adapt well to various conditions, and are popular as companion dogs for apartment dwellers in their native Poland. PONs require a moderate amount of exercise daily.

=== Activities ===
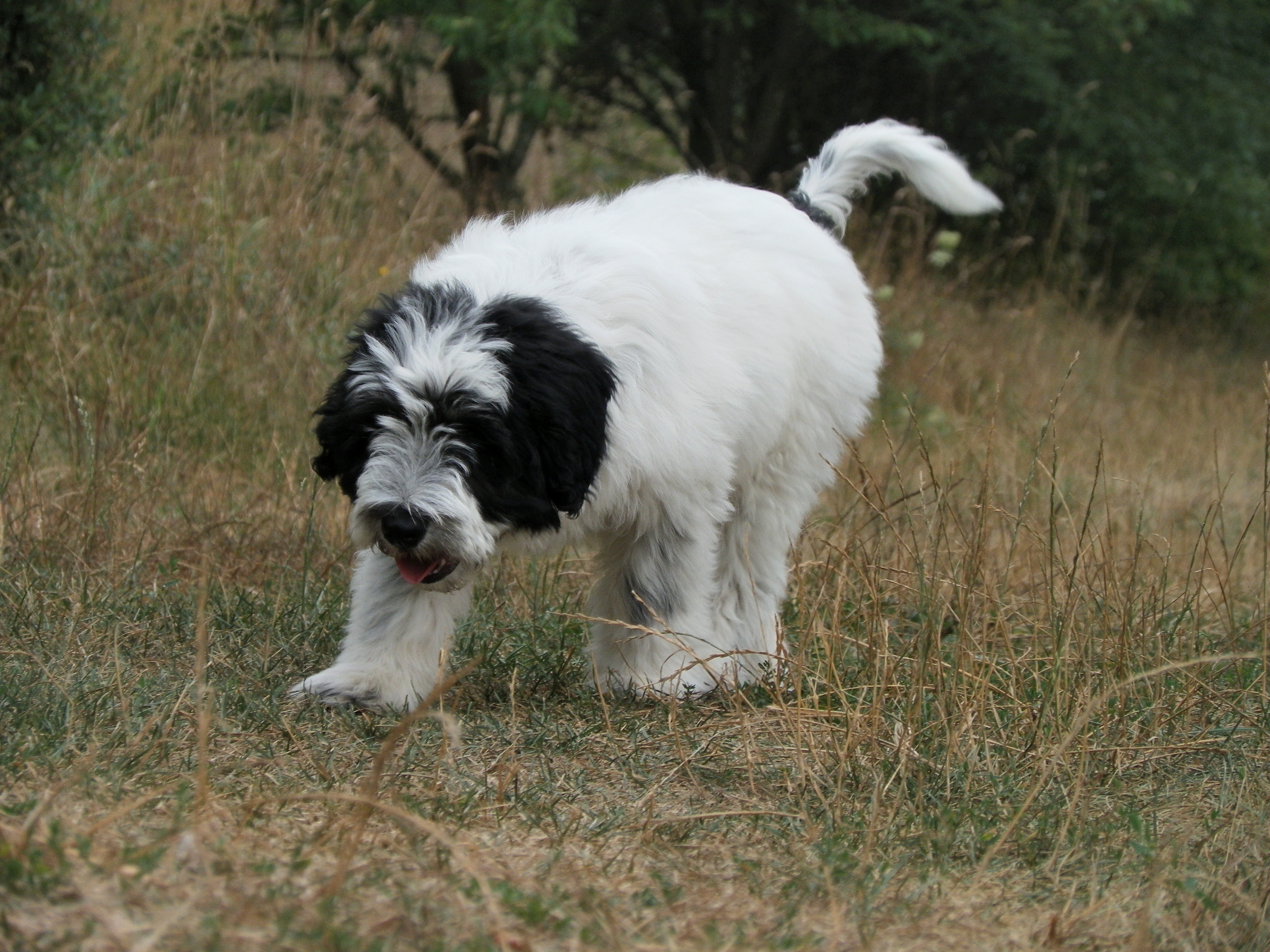
A 3-month-old male puppy

The Polish Lowland Sheepdog can compete in dog agility trials, obedience, Rally obedience, showmanship, flyball, tracking, and herding events. Herding instincts and trainability can be measured at noncompetitive herding tests. PONs that exhibit basic herding instincts can be trained to compete in herding trials.

=== Health ===
In general, PONs are a very healthy breed. Animals should be checked for hip dysplasia and checked for eye abnormalities such as PRA (Progressive Retinal Atrophy) before being used for breeding. PONs require a low protein diet. The life expectancy of a PON is approximately 12 years.

== History ==
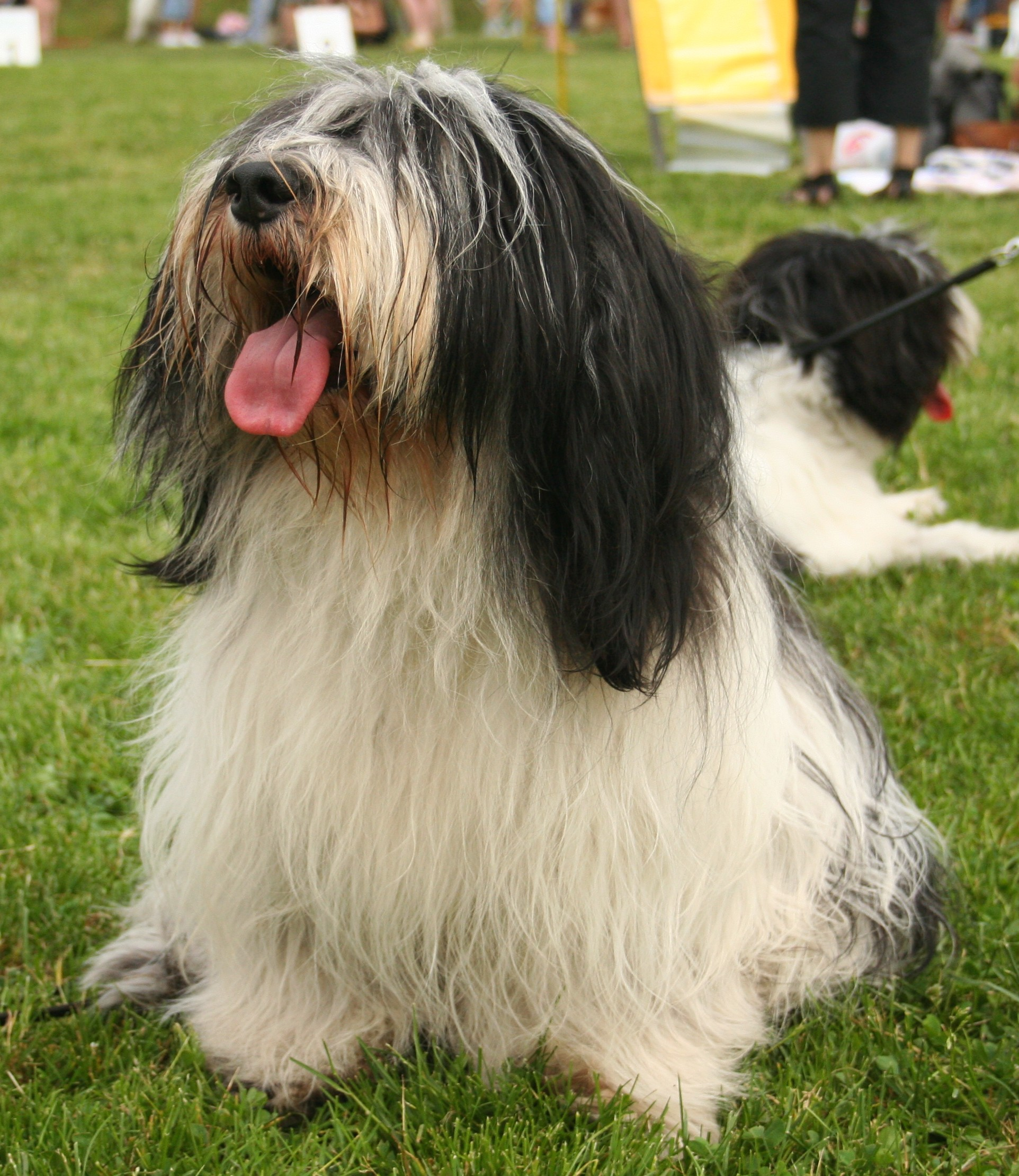
A Polish Lowland Sheepdog at a dog show in Racibórz, Poland.

Known in its present form in Poland from at least the thirteenth century, the PON is most likely descended from the Puli, Tibetan Terrier and the herding dogs.

Legend has it that the Polish Lowland Sheepdog was part-ancestor of the Bearded Collie.

Almost driven to extinction in World War II, the PON was restored mainly through the work of Dr. Danuta Hryniewicz and her dog, Smok ("Dragon"), the ancestor of all PONs in the world today, who sired the first ten litters of PONs in the 1950s.

In fact, Dr. Hryniewicz considered Smok to be the epitome of the breed, with a perfect anatomical build and a wonderful temperament. Smok set the standard and type that was emulated by PON breeders for generations to come, and from which the first official standard for the PON was finally written, and accepted by the FCI, Fédération Cynologique Internationale, in 1959. He is considered to be the 'father' of the modern Polish Lowland Sheepdog. His moderate build lends itself to working effortlessly all day long, running with ease to herd the sheep. Pictures of Smok can be seen in the book, "The Official Book of the Polish Lowland Sheepdog".

The American Kennel Club recognized the Polish Lowland Sheepdog as a breed in the Herding Group in 2001.

== See also ==
- List of dog breeds
