= Norman Hound =

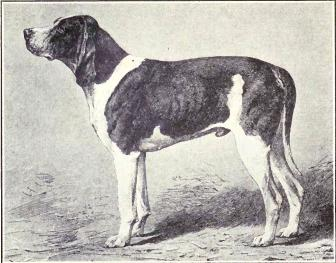
- Origin: France
- Breed status: Extinct
Traits
- Height: 66–76 cm (26–30 in)
- Colour: Broad range, including white, tri-colour and black

The Norman Hound is a now extinct breed of scent hound from France.

== Overview ==
Little is known about the origins of the Norman Hound, it has been said it was developed from St. Hubert Hounds and local hounds from Normandy. The breed was introduced into England by the Normans in the 11th century after their conquest of the country, and it believed both the Bloodhound and Talbot descended from it.

The Norman Hound was said to have excellent scenting abilities, great stamina and a magnificent voice, but was extremely slow; a pack usually took between six and eight hours to hunt a stag. The breed was very large, standing between 66 and 76 centimetres (26 and 30 in). They came in a broad range of colours, from pure white, to tri-colour (black, tan and white), to pure black. They were said to be unintelligent and to lack initiative.

The Norman Hound was becoming rare by the 18th century as it was replaced by faster hound types, in the 1830s only one pack remained and by 1875 they were declared extinct.

== See also ==
- List of extinct dog breeds
