= John Froude =

English clergyman (1777-1852)

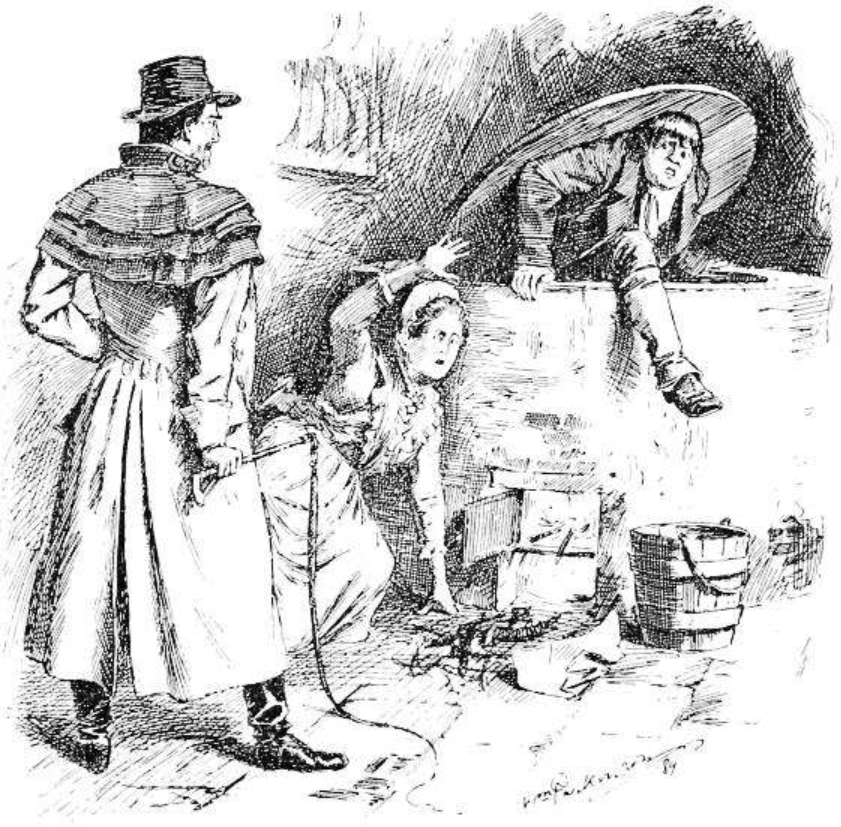
Illustration from R. D. Blackmore's novel The Maid of Sker (1872): Parson Chowne, a character based upon Rev. John Froude, brandishing his hunting whip at his housekeeper and her boyfriend

The Reverend John Froude II (1777 – 9 September 1852) of Knowstone and East Anstey, both in Devon, England, was an English Anglican priest. As Rector of Molland-cum-Knowstone, in Devon, he was an notorious example of the "hunting parson", for whom "hunting was...the main pursuit of their life, and clerical duties were neglected or perfunctorily performed". During his lifetime the anti-hunting lobby of the evangelicals was gaining ground. In his case this movement was represented by his nemesis Henry Phillpotts, Bishop of Exeter, with whom he had many amusing disputes.

He was the model for the evil "Parson Chowne" in The Maid of Sker, the 1872 novel by R. D. Blackmore, and was described by the Devon historian Hoskins (1954) as "an unspeakable oaf". According to Sabine Baring-Gould:

"Froude fascinated his neighbours, overawing them as a snake is said to fascinate a mouse. If he told them to do a thing, or to keep silent, he was obeyed. They dared not do otherwise...He encouraged about him a lawless company of vagabonds who, when they were not in prison, lived roughly at free quarters at the rectory, and from thence carried on their business of petty larceny; and who were, moreover, ready to execute vengeance upon the rector's enemies".

== Origins ==
Inscribed board displayed in Knowstone Church: list of rectors, vicars and patrons of the combined parish of Knowstone-cum-Molland in Devon

The Froude family is first recorded in surviving records at Kingston, South Hams, Devon, in the 16th century. He was the son of Rev. John Froude I (1743–1803), Rector of Molland-cum-Knowstone from 1767, born at Modbury in Devon, christened 9 September 1743 at St. George's Church, Modbury. According to Foster's Alumni Oxoniensis, John Froude I was the son of John Froude of Modbury and matriculated at Exeter College, Oxford on 31 March 1762, aged 18. John Froude I had been appointed Rector of Molland-cum-Knowstone by his brother Robert Froude (1741–1770) of Aveton Gifford, patron of Molland-cum-Knowstone and father of Robert Hurrell Froude (1771–1859), Archdeacon of Totnes.

John Froude II's mother was Prestwood Love Legassick (1750–1823), a daughter of John Legassick, and with her two sisters a co-heiress of the manor of Modbury and of the manors of Dodbrooke and Mothecombe, which became the property of her husband. In 1803 Henry Legassick had purchased the manor and borough of Modbury from the Trist family.

John Froude II's sister Prestwood Love Froude married William Bellew (1772–1826) of Stockleigh Court in Devon, descended from a notable gentry family of ancient Irish origins, this branch of which had married one of the heiresses of the prominent and wealthy Fleming family of Bratton Fleming in Devon.

== Career ==
Froude matriculated at Exeter College, Oxford, on 30 May 1797, aged 19, and obtained the degree of BA in 1801. His father died in 1803 and in 1804 he was appointed by his mother, patroness of the living, as Rector of Knowstone-cum-Molland, in place of his father.

According to Baring-Gould: "(John Froude II) had been well educated, and was a graduate of Oxford University. It is said that he had met with great disappointment in love, and early in life retired into what was, in the beginning of the nineteenth century, the great retirement from the world of culture and intellectual activity, Knowstone-cum-Molland". Froude was appointed Rector of Molland-cum-Knowstone by his widowed mother in 1804, to replace his deceased father in that position, and remained there until his death in 1852. He spent most of his time hunting with his own pack of hounds, and shooting birds. According to Baring-Gould: "Froude's church preferment was at the time valuable, and he was, moreover, in possession of some considerable private fortune in addition to his professional income. He had few educated people residing in his neighbourhood. With the quiet, inoffensive clergy about he would not associate; with others he could not, as they held themselves aloof from him. He soon came to associate almost entirely with the rough farmers who inhabited the Exmoor district, and he grew to resemble them in mind, language, habits of life and dress. From them he was principally differentiated by his native wit, his superior education, and his exceeding wickedness".

He had several run-ins with his nemesis Henry Phillpotts, Bishop of Exeter 1830 to 1869, which are recorded humorously in several near-contemporary sources. Phillpotts was a determined persecutor of clerics who were not wholly focussed on serving their parish as ministers of religion, and tried to abolish the country squire lifestyle followed by many clerics within his diocese of Devon and Cornwall. However Froude's position as rector was for life, his father having been the patron, and the bishop had little power over him. When the bishop at last decided to visit Froude in person to appeal to him to desist from his hunting lifestyle, Froude employed various ruses to foil him, from digging up the road to trap the bishop's carriage, to instructing his housekeeper to make him wait in a cold parlour and to frighten him away by reporting her master was suffering with a deadly infectious disease.

He could not abide being crossed by his friends, acquaintances and neighbours, and took his revenge in cruel and vicious ways, including burning hayricks, sabotaging carriages to cause serious accidents, maiming or injuring horses and livestock, burning plantations, choking chimneys, and manipulating his victims into positions of public ridicule. "He had a nicely adjusted scale of punishments for all who offended him". Most of his dirty-work was performed by his admiring gang of thugs and vagabonds whom he protected and provided with food and basic lodgings. He was wise enough never to give them direct orders to commit crimes, but merely hinted at what his pleasure might be, which hints were treated as orders. Examples are quoted by Baring-Gould: "For instance, if a farmer had offended him, he would say to one of these men subject to his influence, "As I've been standing in the church porch, Harry, I thought what a terrible thing it would be if the rick over yonder of Farmer G ---- were to burn. 'Twould come home to him pretty sharp, I reckon." Next night the rick would be on fire" and "A gentleman near had offended him. This person had a plantation of larch near his house. Froude said to Tom, "Bad job for Squire ----, if his larch lost their leaders!" Next morning every larch in the plantation had been mutilated". An example of a direct threat made by him to someone who had crossed him, a fellow parson from Hawkridge, was the following: "Do you not know that to-night on my return I have only to say at Knowstone, "Bones, bones at Hawkridge!" and, mind you, name no names, and your carcase will be stinking in a ditch within the week?". By these means he became feared by all who knew him, whether lowly or rich and powerful. When a man crossed Froude, as if by mystery within a couple of weeks he would suffer some calamity. If Froude's offer to buy a horse was refused, that horse would be blinded. If his parishioners did not pay their tithes to him promptly, their hay-rick would burn down one night, mysteriously. He did not hesitate to sell a blind horse, and when on discovering the fault the buyer demanded his money back, Froude refused, exclaiming: "Sir, you asked me for a hunter, and one that could jump, and I sold you a hunter that could jump. You saw the horse, and it was a bargain. You did not ask me if it could see". Despite all this criminal behaviour, he was a magistrate who wielded considerable local judicial power, as did many of his fellow country gentlemen, most of whom discharged their important duty in an honourable manner. Froude however was not averse to using his position to obtain search warrants from fellow magistrates on false pretences, and thus to have police ordered to search the residence of one of his enemies, destroying his home during the process.

He was a close friend of another "hunting parson", namely the famous Parson Jack Russell, who also lived in North Devon, who recorded many personal anecdotes of Froude's character, mainly concerning his prowess on the hunting field and in breeding hounds. Russell was also a target of Bishop Phillpotts, and avoided his attentions in equally humorous ways as did Froude.

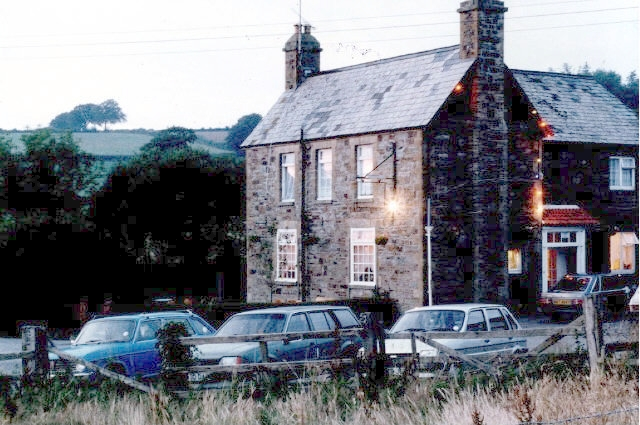
The "Froude Arms" public house in East Anstey, opened before 1878, closed in 2012, now a private residence

He lived for most of his life at Knowstone Rectory, in the middle of what was then wild and untamed moorland. Later he moved to nearby East Anstey Barton, a house he built in 1848 on the site of "the old mansion" in the village of East Anstey, next to the church. In 1850 he was the principal landowner in that parish. In 1866 a "Mrs Froude" (presumably his widow) was residing at Barton House. Until recently his family was commemorated by the "Froude Arms" public house at East Anstey, closed in about 2012. He appears to have been succeeded by his sister's descendant, John Froude Bellew, in 1866 living at Rhyll Manor, East Anstey, and in 1878 described as lord of the manor.

== Marriage ==
He married late in life, before which time it was noted that he always employed good-looking housekeepers. Baring-Gould relates the circumstances of Froude's marriage as follows: "Froude married a Miss Halse, the pretty sister of two well-known yeomen of Anstey. She was quite young enough to have been his daughter, and they had no children perhaps fortunately. The circumstances of the marriage are said to have been these. Froude had paid Miss Halse some of his insolent attentions, that meant, if they meant anything, a certain contemptuous admiration. The brothers were angry. They invited him to their house, made him drunk, and when drunk sign a paper promising to marry their sister before three months were up or to forfeit £20,000. They took care to have this document well attested, and next morning presented it to Mr. Froude, who had forgotten all about it. He was very angry, blustered, cajoled, tried to laugh it off—all to no purpose. He was constrained to marry her. And he seems to have been really fond of her. Certain it is that she was warmly attached to him, and after his death would speak of him as her "dear departed saint," which implies a singular misappropriation of terms, and confusion of ideas".

== Death ==
In The Maid of Sker, Blackmore represents Chowne as torn to pieces by his hounds. Baring-Gould relates the actual circumstances of Froude's death as follows:

"Before his parlour window grew a peculiarly handsome trimmed box-tree. Now Froude had done a mean and cruel act to a young farmer near, tricking him out of a considerable sum of money. One night the box-tree was pulled up by the roots and carried away, no one knew whither, or for certain by whom, though the young farmer was suspected of the deed. Froude raged over the insult; but as he was unable to bring it home, and as his powers were failing, his rage was impotent. The uprooting of the box-tree apparently precipitated his death. He felt that the awe of him was gone, his control over the neighbourhood was lost. This thought, even more than mortification at not being able to revenge the uprooting of his box-tree, broke him down, and he rapidly sank, intellectually and physically, and died 9 December 1852".

He was buried at Knowstone. According to Hoskins: "He left his two parishes, like himself, in a heathen and lawless condition". He appears to have been succeeded by the descendants of his sister Prestwood Love Froude who married William Bellew (1772–1826) of Stockleigh Court in Devon. Her son and heir was John Prestwood Bellew (born 1803) who married Mary Ann Hancock, eldest daughter of William Hancock of Wiveliscombe in Somerset, a wealthy brewer. His son and heir was John Froude Bellew (born 1829), of Rhyll Manor, East Anstey, who in 1866 was the major landowner in that parish and in 1878 was described as lord of the manor. A connection of this family was the rugby player Froude Hancock (1865–1933), whose monument is a large inscribed boulder on West Anstey Common.

== Sources ==
- Davies, E.W., A Memoir of the Rev. John Russell and His Out-Of-Door Life, Chapter 4
- Baring-Gould, Rev. Sabine, Devonshire Characters and Strange Events, 1926, Two Hunting Parsons
- Baring-Gould, Rev. Sabine, Old Country Life, London, 1890, Chapter 6
- Thornton, Rev. W.H., Reminiscences of an Old West-Country Clergyman, 1897.
