= Bearded Collie =

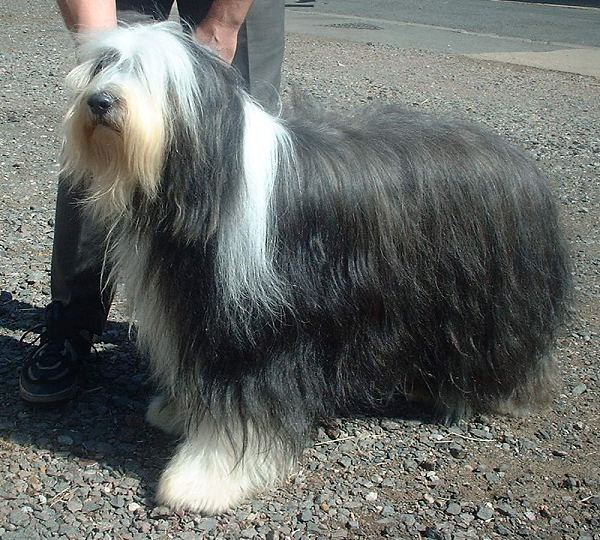
- Other names: Highland Collie; Mountain Collie; Hairy Mou'ed Collie
- Common nicknames: Beardie
- Origin: Scotland
Traits
Height	Males	53–56 cm (21–22 in)
	Females	51–56 cm (20–22 in)
- Weight: 18–27 kg (40–60 lb)
- Coat: long double coat with furnishings
- Colour: black, blue, brown, or fawn with white or tan markings
- Litter size: 4-12 pups
Kennel club standards
- The Kennel Club: standard
- Fédération Cynologique Internationale: standard

The Bearded Collie, also called Beardie, Highland Collie, or Hairy Mountain Dog is a British breed of herding dog of the collie type originating in Scotland. It was formerly used primarily by Scottish shepherds, but now commonly kept as a family companion.

Weights are usually in the range 18–27 kg (40–60 lb), while height at the withers varies from about 51 to 56 cm (20 to 22 in).

== History ==
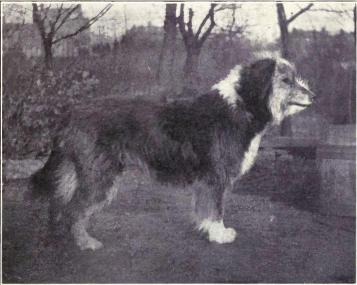
Photograph from about 1915

The legend of the Bearded Collie's origin is that the ancestors of what became the Polish Lowland Sheepdog were abandoned on the shores of Scotland, and these dogs then bred with native herding dogs. A variant on this story is that Kazimierz Grabski, a Polish merchant, reportedly traded a shipment of grain for sheep in Scotland in 1514 and brought six Polish Lowland Sheepdogs to move them. A Scottish shepherd was so impressed with the herding ability of the dogs that he traded several sheep for several dogs. The Polish sheepdogs were bred with local Scottish dogs to produce the Bearded Collie.

The first written reference to the Bearded Collie occurs in 1891, when D.J. Thomson Gray describes them in his book The Dogs of Scotland as

A big, rough, ‘tousy’ looking tyke, with a coat not unlike a doormat, the texture of the hair hard and fibry, and the ears hanging close to the head.

It is generally agreed that Mrs. G. Olive Willison founded the modern show Bearded Collie in 1944 with her brown bitch, Jeannie of Bothkennar. Jeannie was supposedly a Shetland Sheepdog, but Mrs. Willison received a Bearded Collie by accident. She was so fascinated by the dog that she wanted to begin breeding, so she began searching for a dog for Jeannie. While walking along the beach, Mrs. Willison met a man who was emigrating from Scotland; she became the owner of his grey dog, David, who became Bailie of Bothkennar. Bailie and Jeannie of Bothkennar are the founders of the modern show breed.

The last non-Kennel Club registered sire whose offspring received registration was Paul Turnbull's Blue, born in 1978. Turnbull's Blue was of pure working stock, registered to the International Sheep Dog Society on merit in 1984.

While the registered breed lines can be traced to a limited number of bloodlines, there are still many unregistered Bearded Collies in Scotland, some still working as herding dogs.

The breed became popular during the last half of the 20th century—propelled, in part, by Potterdale Classic at Moonhill, a Bearded Collie who won Best in Show at Crufts in 1989. The Bearded Collie Club celebrated its Golden Jubilee in 2005.

== Appearance ==
The Bearded Collie is a medium sized dog with a lean build. Dogs stand from 53–56 cm (21–22 in) and bitches stand from 51–53 cm (20–22 in). Healthy adults can weigh anywhere from 18–27 kg (40–60 lb), according to the breed standard.

Bearded Collies are longer than they are tall, with bitches being slightly longer. They have a square head, moderate stop, and dropping ears of medium size. The pigmentation of the nose, lips and eyes follow and match the color of the individual dog's coat. Both scissor and level bites are accepted, although level bites are generally considered undesirable. The Bearded Collie has a level back and low tail carriage. The tail must never be carried over the back. Their gait is supple, smooth and long-reaching, covering ground with little effort.

The Bearded Collie has a medium length, double coat with a soft, furry and close undercoat and a flat, harsh, strong, and shaggy outercoat. They come in a variety of colors, including black, blue, brown, and fawn, permissible with or without white markings, which may be accompanied by slight tan markings in certain areas.

== As pets ==
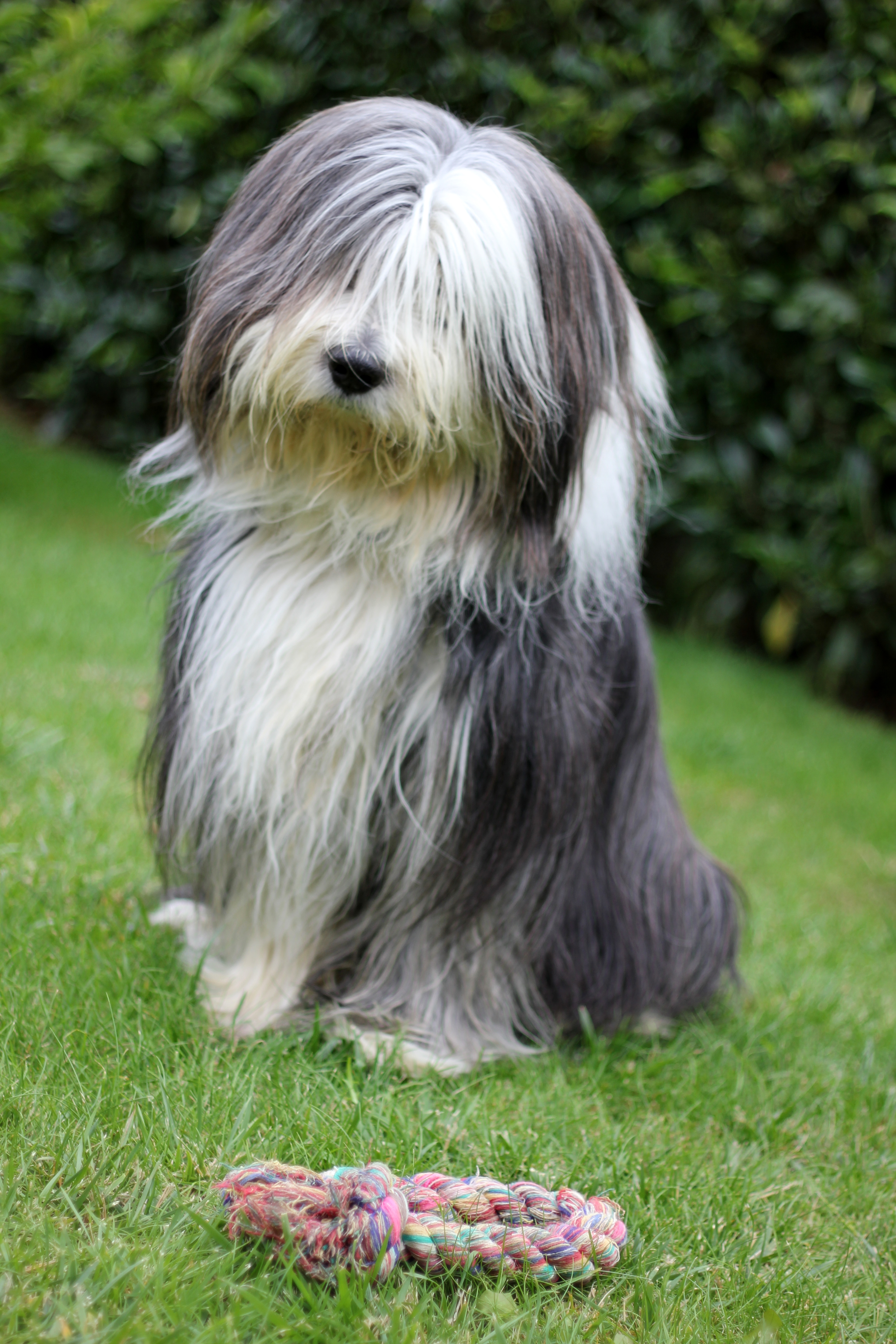
With a toy rope

The Bearded Collie ranks 140 out of 202 breeds in popularity in the United States, according to the American Kennel Club's yearly breed ranking. A Bearded Collie is best obtained from a reputable breeder or a dog rescue. There are Bearded Collie rescue associations, such as Bearded Collie Rescue.

As they were bred to be herders, Bearded Collies have a high energy level, and those kept as pets require vigorous exercise. It is recommended that a pet Bearded Collie have at least two half-hour play sessions per day, and that they have a large garden to roam in. They also require regular grooming; weekly brushing is mandatory for keeping their long hair mat-free. Bearded Collies that are not being shown can be clipped all over (a "puppy cut") to make grooming easier, though this can result in the dog looking little like the normal appearance.

Bearded Collies are intelligent, and can compete in obedience trials. Obedience Champion Scapa, trained by Jenne Wiggins, was the first Bearded Collie obedience champion. They are also frequently seen in agility, flyball, and freestyle competitions.

== Working life ==
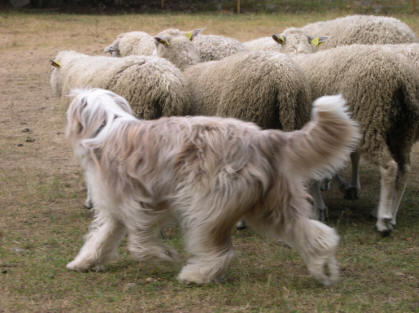
Herding sheep

The Bearded Collie is used to herd both sheep and cattle. It is essentially a working dog — bred to be hardy and reliable, able to stand up to the harshest conditions and the toughest sheep. The Bearded Collie is classified as a Vulnerable Native Breed by The Kennel Club.

Herding instincts and tractability can be assessed in noncompetitive herding tests. Bearded Collies exhibiting basic herding instincts can be trained to compete in herding trials.

== Health ==
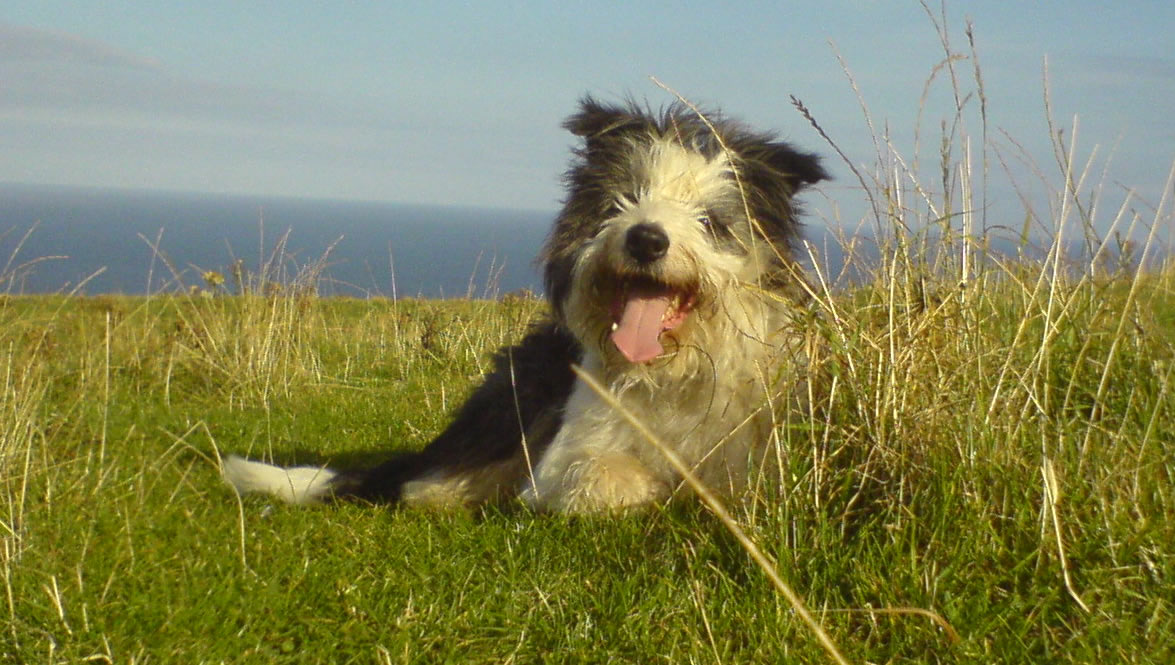
A three-year-old dog

=== Mortality ===
A 2024 UK study found a life expectancy of 13.9 years for the breed compared to an average of 12.7 for purebreeds and 12 for crossbreeds.

Leading causes of death amongst Bearded Collies in a 2004 Kennel Club survey were old age (26%), cancer (19%), cerebrovascular disease (9%), and chronic kidney failure (8%).

=== Morbidity ===
Further existing breed dispositions of the Bearded Collie include: Dermatological conditions, such as pemphigus foliaceous and black skin disease, follicular dysplasia, musculoskeletal conditions such as congenital elbow luxation, ocular conditions, such as corneal dystrophy, cataract and generalized progressive retinal atrophy (GPRA).

=== Hypoadrenocorticism ===
Hypoadrenocorticism (also known as Addison's disease) is an inherited disease in Bearded Collies, although the mechanism of inheritance is not known. It occurs when the adrenal cortex produces insufficient glucocorticoid and/or mineralocorticoid hormones. It affects approximately 2–3.4% of Bearded Collies in the USA/Canada, and causes the death of at least 1% of Bearded Collies in the UK. These are much higher percentages than for the general dog population (0.1%), and hypoadrenocorticism causes a disproportionate number of deaths among young dogs.
