= English Foxhound =

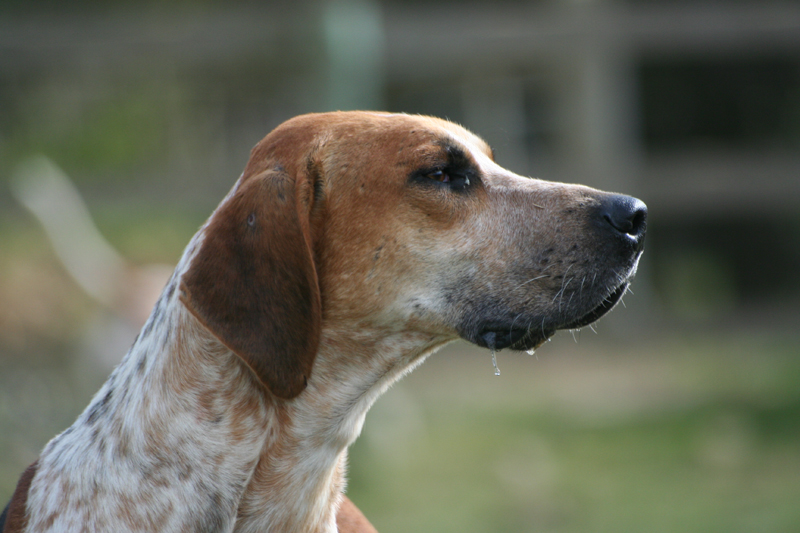
- Other names: Foxhound
- Origin: Great Britain - England
Traits
- Height: 23–25 inches (58–64 cm)
Kennel club standards
- The Kennel Club: standard
- Fédération Cynologique Internationale: standard

The English Foxhound is one of the four foxhound breeds of dog. It is a cousin of the American Foxhound. They are scent hounds, bred to hunt foxes by scent.

== Description ==
=== Appearance ===
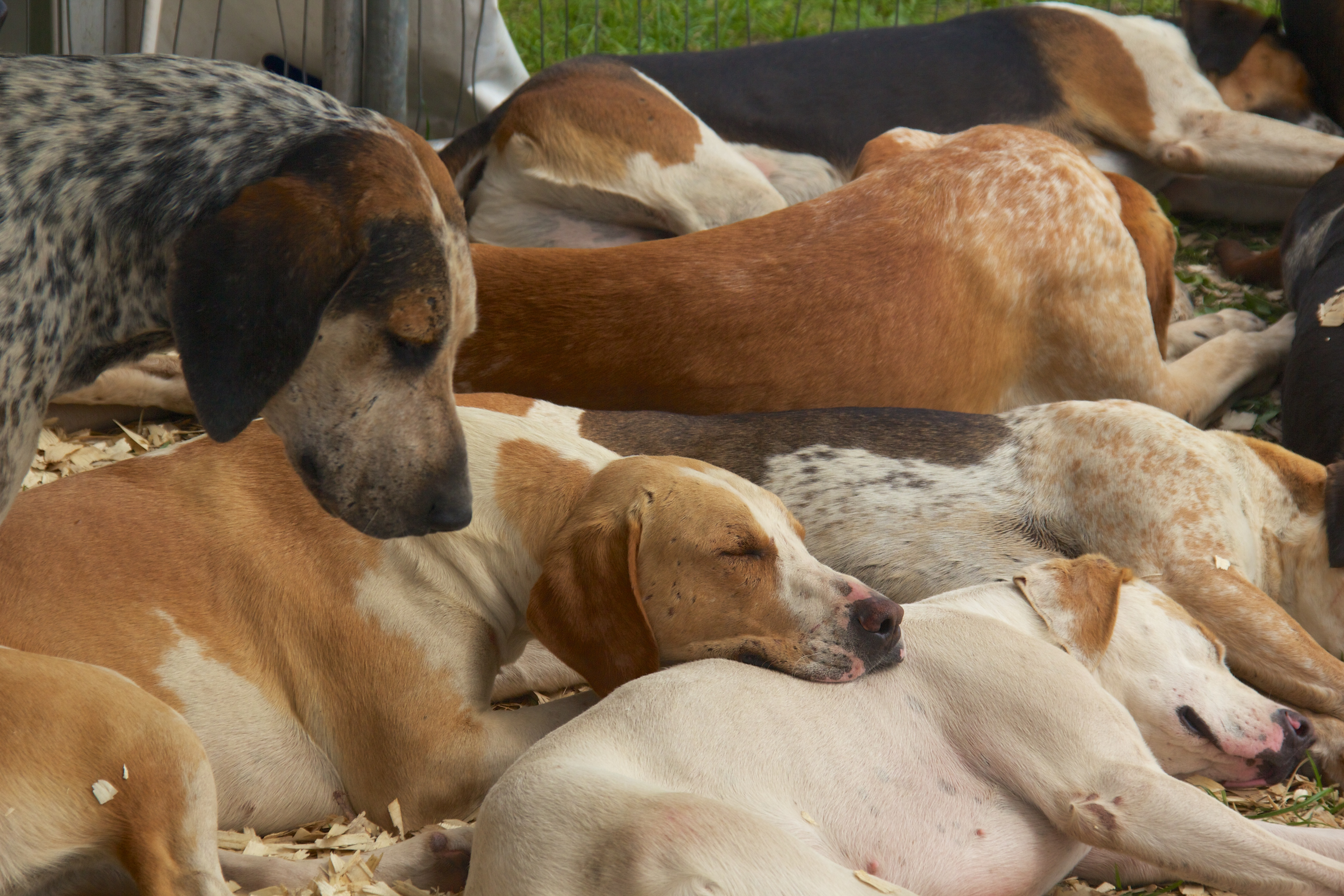
English Foxhounds at rest

The breed standards' guidelines for showing English Foxhounds requires them to be 20–27 inches (51–69 cm) tall at the withers. The skull is thick and the muzzle is long. The legs are muscular, straight-boned, and the paws are rounded, almost cat-like. The English Foxhound comes in any hound colour.

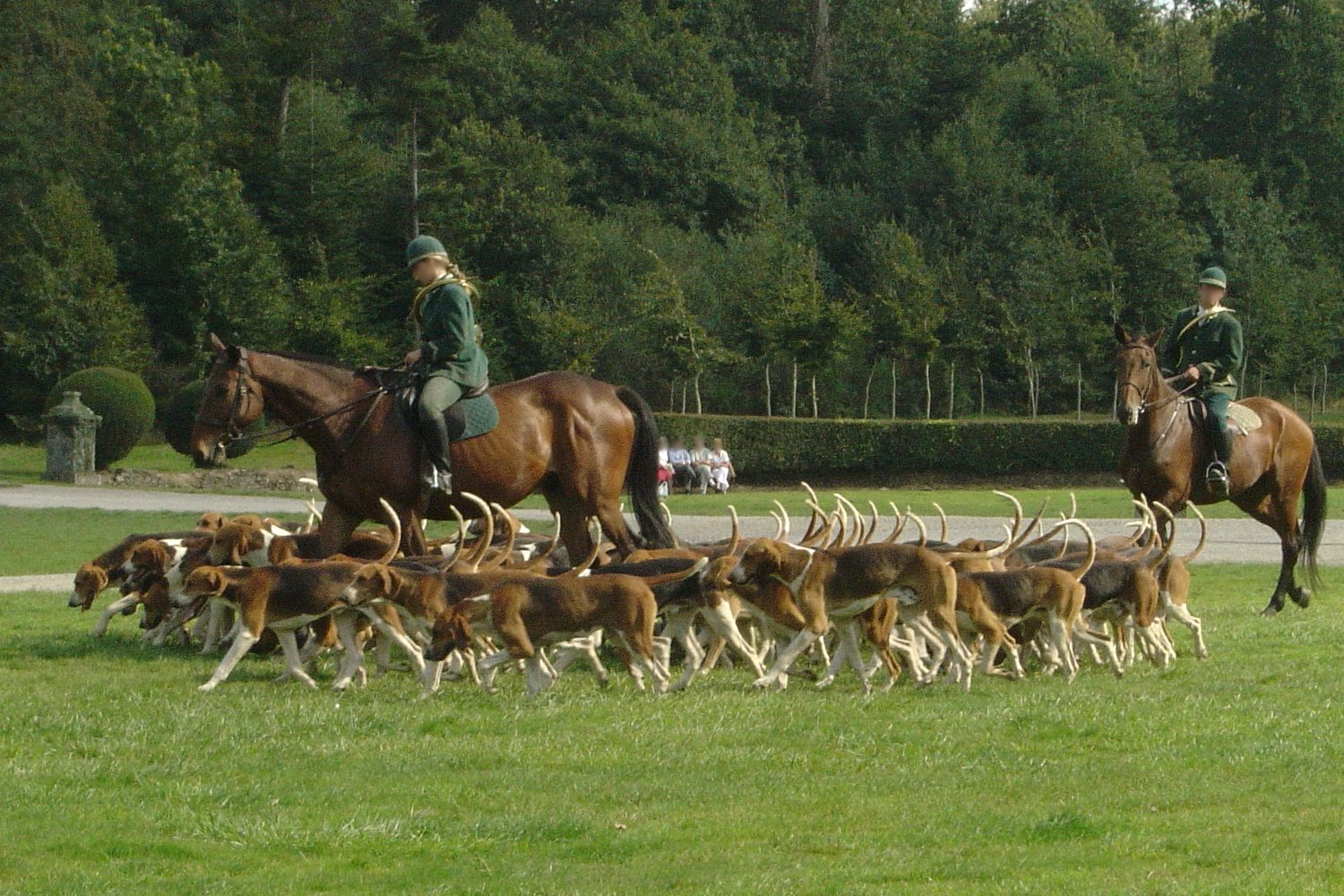
A pack of English Foxhounds

== History ==
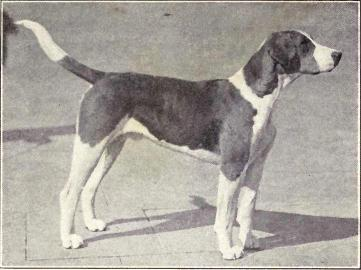
English Foxhound circa 1915

The English Foxhound has been bred for over two hundred years, with the stud books dating back before 1800.

During the British rule in India, English Foxhounds were exported to India for the purpose of jackal coursing, though due to the comparatively hotter weather, they were rarely long lived. Foxhounds were preferred for this purpose over greyhounds, as the former was not as fast, and could thus provide a longer, more sporting chase.

Studbooks for the English foxhound have been kept since the 18th century.

== See also ==
- List of dog breeds
