= Bracke =

Bracke may refer to:

- Bräcke Municipality, a Swedish municipality
- Bräcke, a locality in Sweden
- Bracke (grape), another name for the French wine grape Braquet
- Bracke is a German word for hound, which is used to describe multiple dog breeds:
  - Deutsche Bracke, literally meaning German Hound
  - Finnish Bracke, known as Finnish Hound
  - Tiroler Bracke, known as Tyrolean Hound

== People with the surname ==
- Ferdinand Bracke (born 1939), Belgian cyclist
- Roger Bracke (1913–1993), Belgian sculptor
- Siegfried Bracke (born 1953), Belgian politician
- Simon Bracke (born 1995), Belgian footballer
- Tony Bracke (born 1971), Belgian cyclist
- Wilhelm Bracke (1842–1880), German social-democrat and journalist
