= Dachsbracke =

Dachsbracke may refer to:

- Alpine Dachsbracke, breed of dog originating in Austria
- Westphalian Dachsbracke, breed of dog originating in Westphalia, Germany
- Drever, also known as Schwedische Dachsbracke in German

== See also ==
- Dachshund
