= Alpine Dachsbracke =

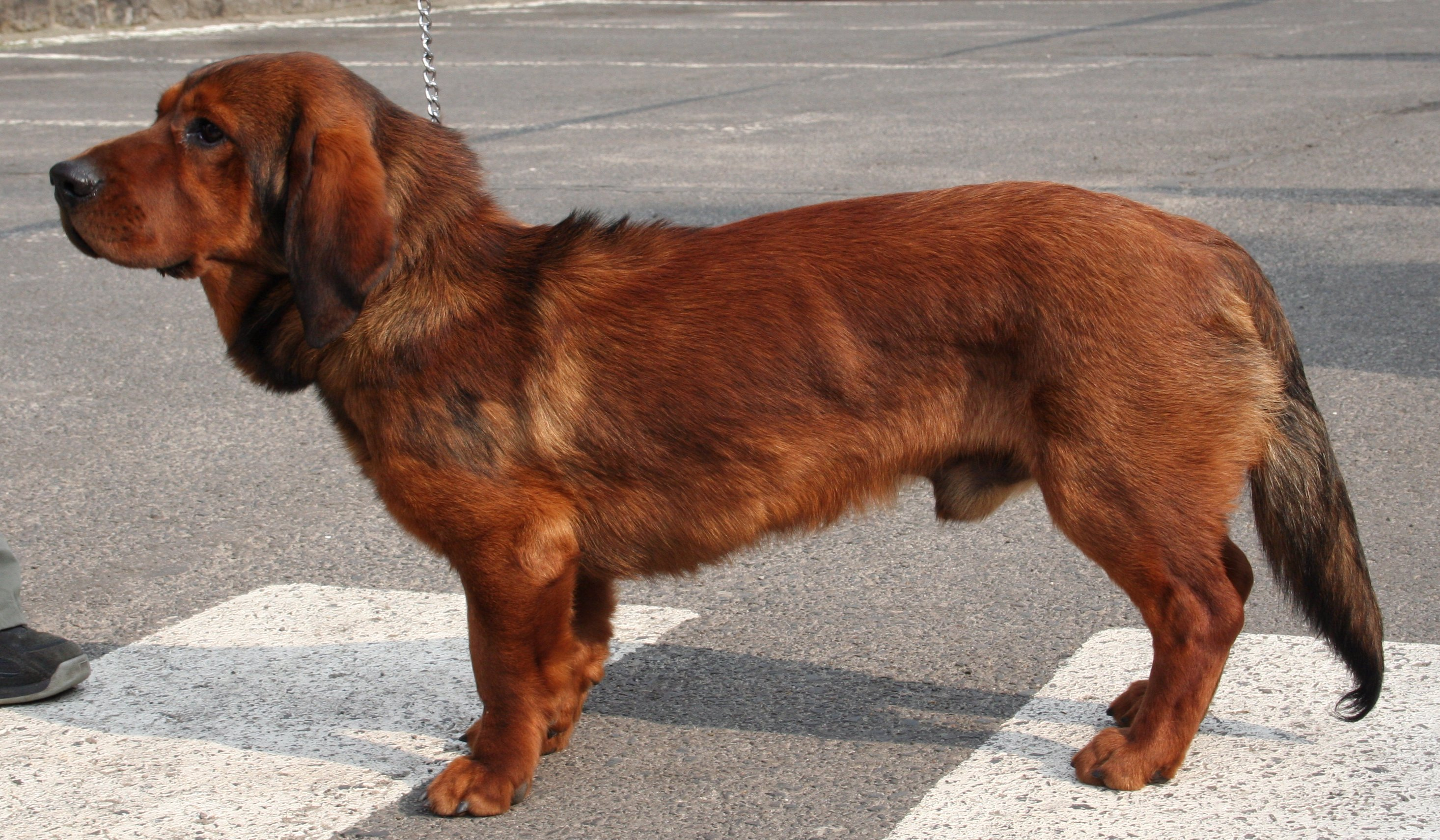
- Alpine Dachsbracke
- Other names: Alpenländische Dachsbracke
- Origin: Austria
Traits
- Height: 13 to 16 inches (33 to 41 cm)
- Weight: 33 to 40 pounds (15 to 18 kg)
- Coat: Dense, short, smooth
- Color: Dark deer red, sometimes black hairs
Kennel club standards
- Fédération Cynologique Internationale: standard

The Alpine Dachsbracke (German: Alpenländische Dachsbracke) is a small breed of dog of the scent hound type originating in Austria. The Alpine Dachsbracke was bred to track wounded deer as well as boar, hare, and fox. It is highly efficient at following a trail even after it has gone cold. The Alpine Dachsbracke is very sturdy.

== Description ==
=== Appearance ===
This small dog has a slight resemblance to a Dachshund, with short legs (although longer than a dachshund's) and a long body. The coat is dense, short but smooth except for the tail and neck. The round eyes have a lively expression. Being very sturdy, the Alpine Dachsbracke is visibly robust and has a big boned structure.

Preferred colors in competition are dark deer red with or without black hairs lightly interspersed. Black with red-brown markings on the head, chest, legs, feet, and tail are also permitted, as well as a white star on the chest (according to the American Rare Breed Association). The ideal height for dogs is 37–38 cm, and the ideal height for bitches is 36–37 cm. Strong limbs and feet, with black toenails and tight toes as well as strong elastic skin are features that judges look for in competition. They also look for a trotting gait. The top coat should be very thick, the undercoat dense and both closefitting to the body.

The Alpine Dachsbracke weighs from 15 to 18 kg (33 to 40 lb) and stands from 34 to 42 cm (13.5 to 16.5 in) at the withers. It is often compared with the dachshund, as they are very similar in appearance.

=== Temperament ===
Used effectively to track wounded deer, this breed could work even in harsh terrain and high altitude. It makes a good companion, although it is primarily a hunter and therefore is kept mostly by hunters. It has a fearless, friendly and intelligent personality. Most Alpine Dachsbrackes are excellent with children and good with dogs and other pets, though they may exhibit a strong prey drive typical of many scent dogs.

== History ==
Alpine Dachsbrackes, as with the other Bracke, can be dated back to the middle of the 19th century. The Dachsbrache were bred down in size by crossing the larger dogs with Dachshunds. It once was a favorite of German royalty. During the 1880s, Alpine Dachsbrackes accompanied Crown Prince Rudolf of Habsburg on hunting trips to Egypt and Turkey.

The Fédération Cynologique Internationale recognizes the Alpine Dachsbracke in Group 6 Scenthounds, Section 2 “Leash Hounds” with the Bavarian Mountain Scenthound (Bayrischer Gebirgsschweisshund, no. 217) and the Hanoverian Scenthound (Hannover'scher Schweisshund, no. 213). The only major kennel club in the English-speaking world to recognise the Alpine Dachsbracke is the United Kennel Club (US) in their Scenthound Group, but they use the Fédération Cynologique Internationale breed standard. The breed is also recognized by a number of minor registries, hunting clubs, and internet-based dog registry businesses.

== See also ==
- List of dog breeds
- Hunting dog
- Scenthound
- Finnish Hound
- Westphalian Dachsbracke
- Drever (also called Swedish Dachsbracke)
