= Finnish Hound =

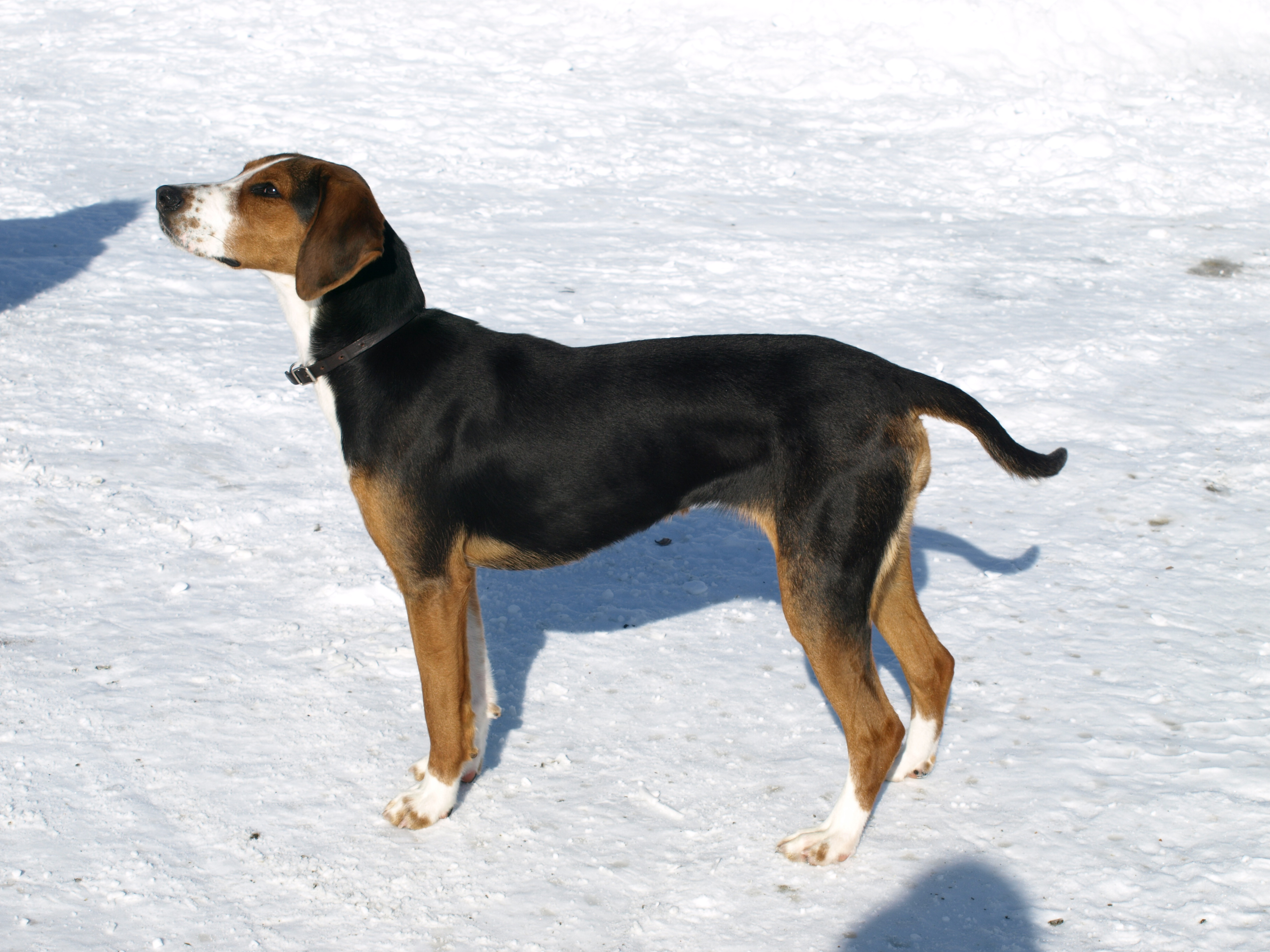
- Other names: Suomenajokoira
- Origin: Finland
Traits
Height	Males	55–61 cm (22–24 in)
	Females	52–58 cm (20–23 in)
- Weight: 20–25 kg (44–55 lb)
Kennel club standards
- Suomen Kennelliitto: standard
- Fédération Cynologique Internationale: standard

The Finnish Hound (Finnish: suomenajokoira [ˈsuo̯menˌɑjoˌkoi̯rɑ]) is a breed of dog originally bred for hunting hare and fox.

== History ==
The Finnish Hound was a result of a breeding programme in the 1800s, which involved French, German and Swedish hounds. The goal was to develop a hound dog that could work on hilly terrain and in deep snow. The Finnish Hound ranked second-most popular amongst the most popular breeds according to registries in Finland in 2013.

== Description ==
=== Appearance ===
Finnish Hounds are a tricolored, medium sized dog. Dogs stand from 55–61 cm (22–24 in) and bitches stand from 52–58 cm (20–23 in). Adults typically weigh 20–25 kg (44–55 lb).

The Finnish Hound is greater in length than they are in height and have a strong build. The top of its skull is domed, and its muzzle is as long as the skull. The topline of the skull is parallel to the bridge of the nose, which has a slight but clearly defined stop and must be black. The breed has dark brown eyes, drooping ears, and a tight and complete scissor bite. Its body is muscular and well-angulated, accompanied by a deep and clearly visible chest. Tail carriage should be low and slightly arched.

Finnish Hounds trot lightly and efficiently with a long-reaching stride. Their topline remains level and firm when moving.

The Finnish Hound has a short, dense and coarse double coat. The coat pattern is tricolor with tan and black predominantly, and small white markings on the head, neck, chest, lower parts of the legs, and tail tip.

=== Temperament ===
The Finnish Hound has a calm and friendly temperament, and must never be aggressive.

== Hunting ==
It is energetic in the hunt and is a versatile tracker. It works independently and pursues the quarry with passionate barking. It is energetic in the hunt and is a versatile tracker. It works independently and pursues the quarry with passionate barking. Finnish Hounds are energetic working dogs with great stamina.

== Health ==
=== Cerebellar ataxia ===
Finnish Hounds suffer from an inherited disease, progressive cerebellar ataxia. This disease has an early onset, showing clinical signs as early as 3 months, with symptoms including tremors, progressive motor incoordination, and developmental delay. This has been traced to a homozygous missense mutation in a gene called SEL1L. The disease may be identified by detecting cerebellar shrinkage through MRI. A genetic test to prevent this disease from being passed down has been developed.

=== Other conditions ===
The breed is also known to occasionally suffer from hip dysplasia, cardiomyopathy, lymphoma, black hair follicular dysplasia, and atopic dermatitis.

=== Inbreeding ===
The average inbreeding coefficient in 1997 in Finnish Hounds was 3.12%.

== See also ==
- List of dog breeds
- Scenthound
- Alpine Dachsbracke
- Westphalian Dachsbracke
- Drever
- Scenthound Group
