= German Hound =

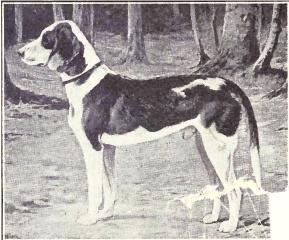
- German Hound from 1915
- Other names: Deutsche Bracke, German Bracke, Olper Bracke, Westphalian Bracke
- Origin: Germany
Kennel club standards
- VDH: standard
- Fédération Cynologique Internationale: standard

The German Hound (Deutsche Bracke) is a breed of dog originating in Westphalia, a region of Germany. The German Hound is of the scenthound type, used for hunting both large and small game.

== Appearance ==
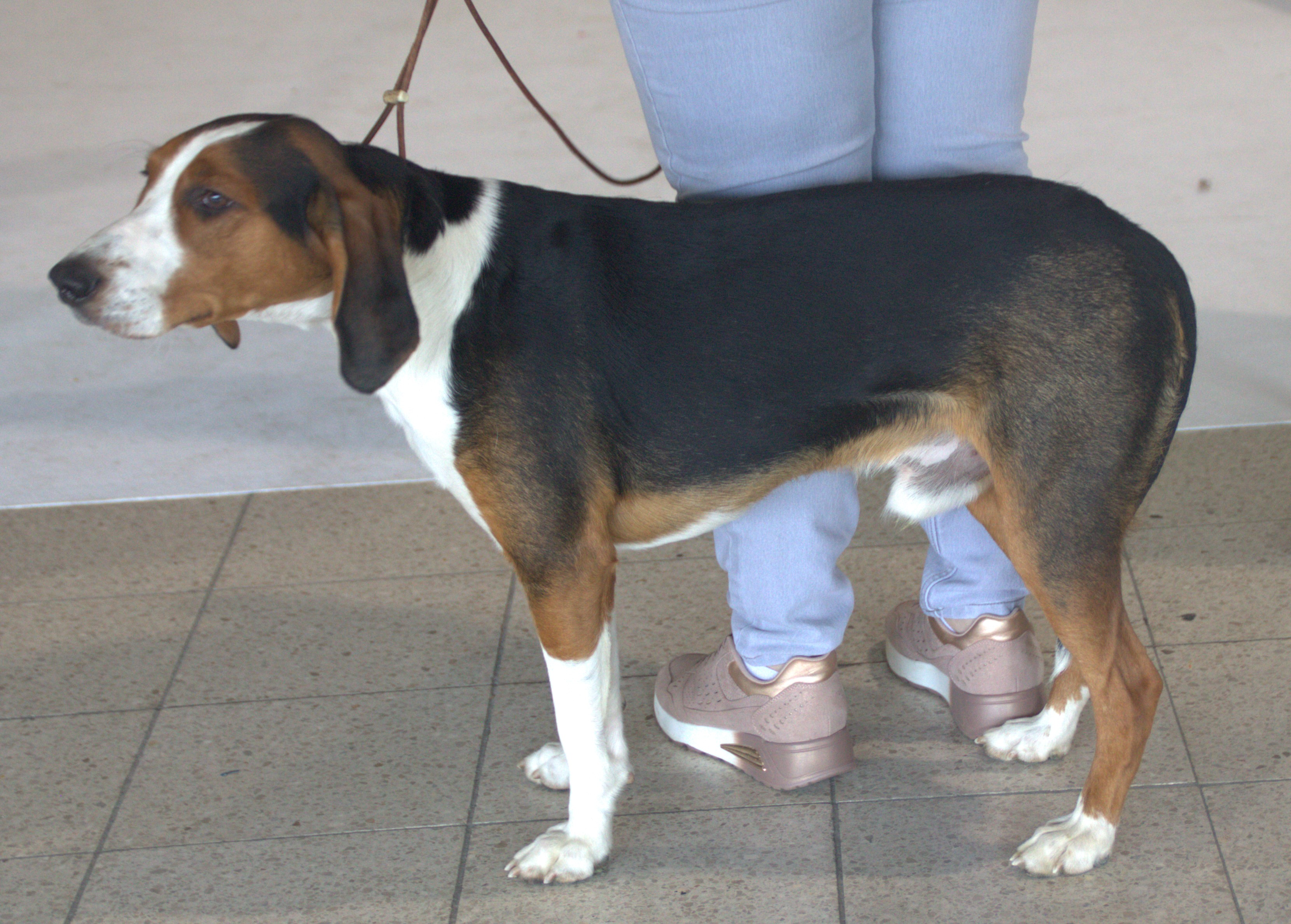
German Hound in a dog show, 2025.

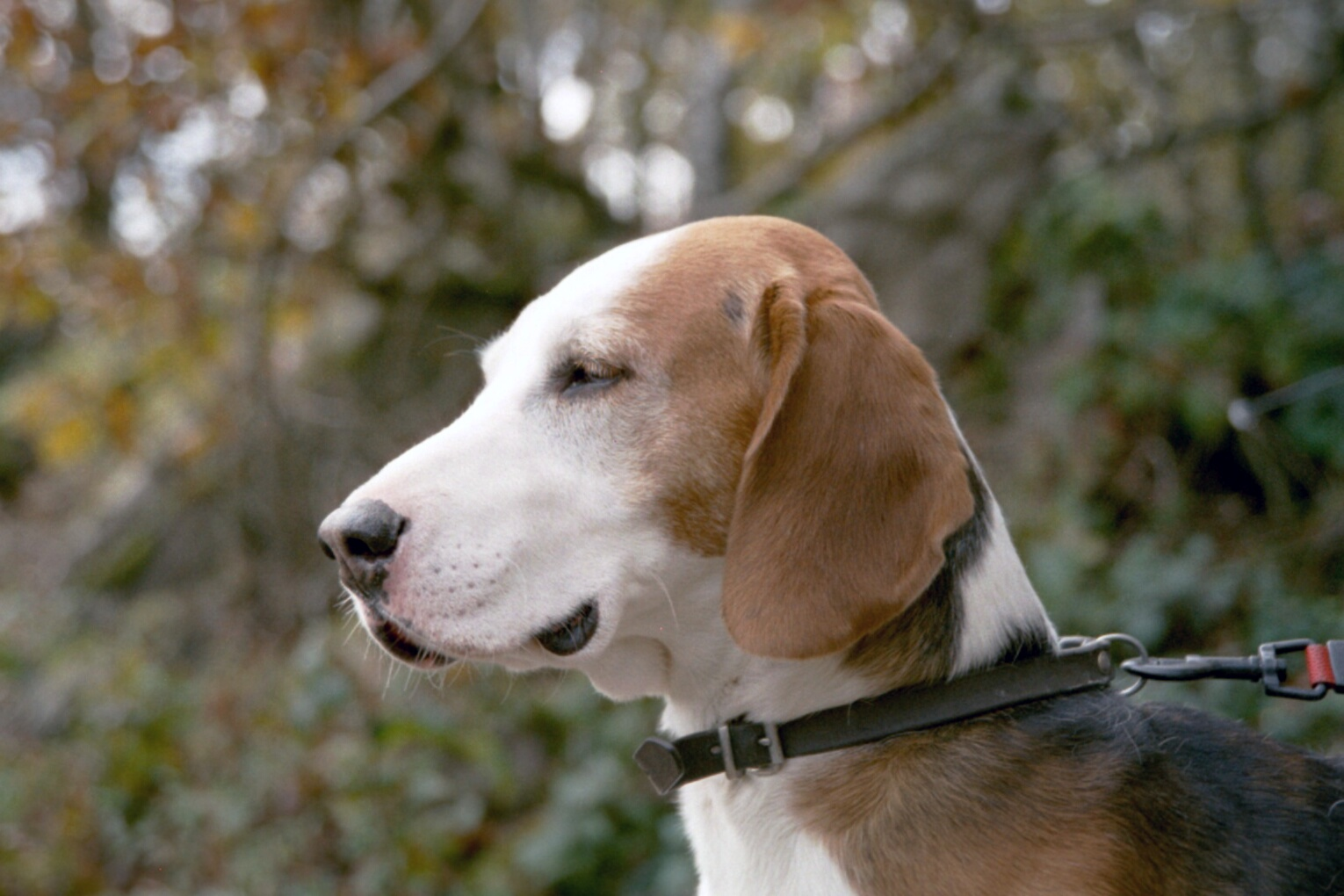
Photo of a German Hound

The German Hound is a small hound, 40 – 53 cm (16 – 21 ins) at the withers, with long, drooped ears and a long, narrow tail. It is distinguished by a long, somewhat narrow head, and a rectangular body, described as "elegant".

The coat has hard, almost bristly, short fur, usually tricolor (red to yellow with a black mantle), with white markings called Bracken marks - a white muzzle, chest, legs, collar, and tip of the tail, and a blaze on the head.

== History ==
In 1896, the Deutschen Bracken Club, encompassing all of the local types of Bracke in northwest Germany, was formed in Finnentrop and moved to Olpe in 1911. The breeds were merged in 1900 as one breed and were officially designated Deutsche Bracke. This breed was formerly called by a variety of old regional names such as "Olpe Bracke", "Sauerländer Bracke" and "Westphalian Bracke", and other local types now blended into one breed. The only breeds of Bracke in the area today are the German Hound and the Westphalian Dachsbracke. The Westphalian Dachsbracke is a short-legged dog, possibly a cross of a Bracke with the Dachshund.

Hunting with the Bracke in early times was done with hunters on horses following the hounds, as developed by the ancient Celts chasing deer and modern-day fox hunters. Another sport, developed in the 16th century, did not require the expense of horses and big kennels, and used firearms, called Brackade. Hounds hunting this way tenaciously followed the game while voicing cries that communicate to the hunter where the dog is and what type of game it is following. Today the Deutsche Bracke is usually used to hunt deer, but also rabbits and fox. Often, it is hunted singly as a leash hound, to hunt on smaller areas. The space needed to hunt a pack of hounds is described by the breed club as a minimum area of 1,000 ha (2471 acres). Related to the hunting with Bracke is the use of horns to communicate with the dogs, a custom that continues today.

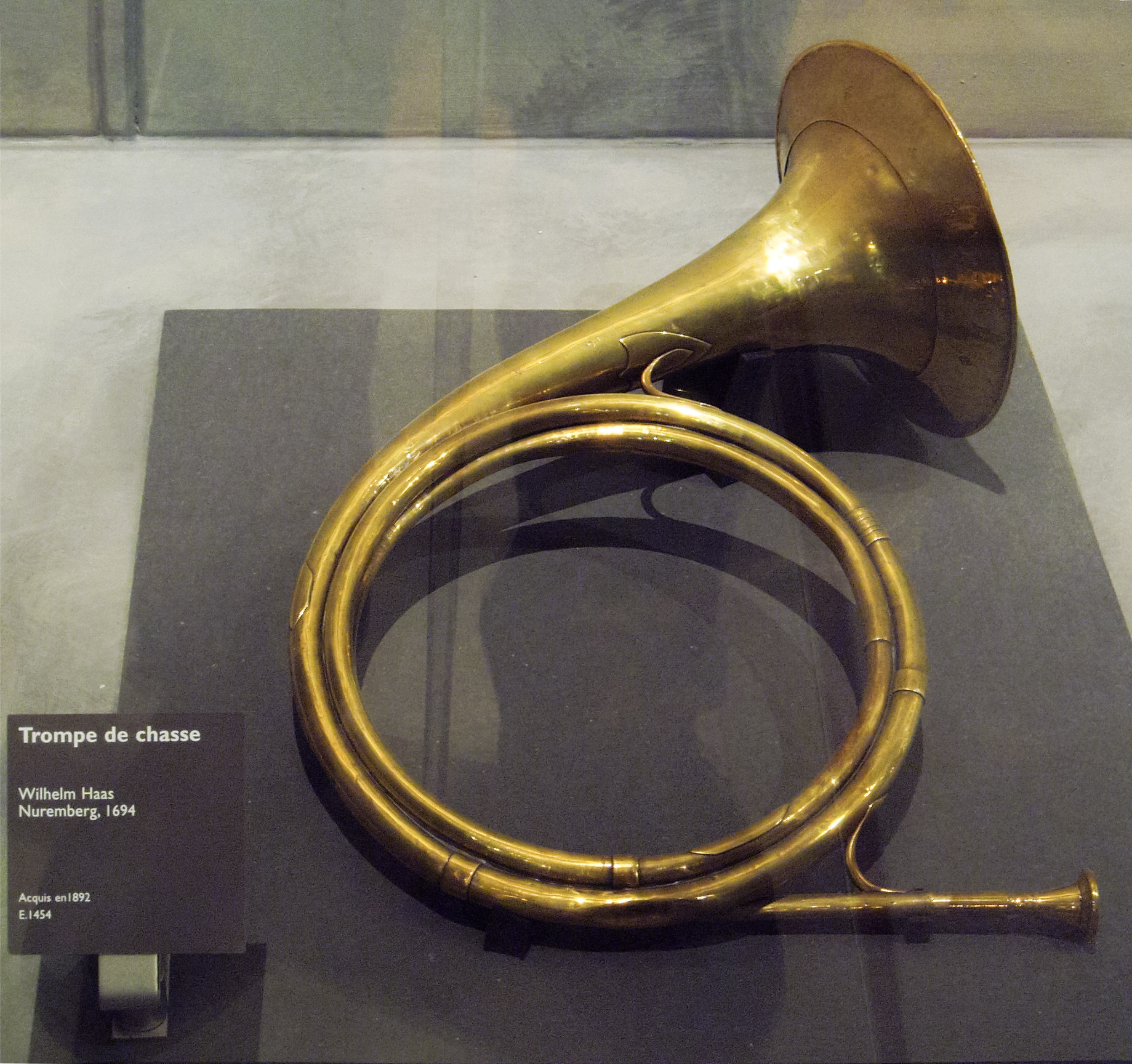
A hunting horn, used to communicate with hounds

The German Hound was recognized by the Verband für das Deutsche Hundewesen (German Kennel Club) through the Deutschen Bracken Club was formed in 1896 and continues today, and oversees breeding and hunt testing, as well as preserving traditions of Bracke hunting. The German Hound was the first Bracke to be registered as a distinct breed, in 1900, and by the Fédération Cynologique Internationale as breed number 299 in Group 6 (Scenthounds), Section 1.3 (Small hounds). Of the major kennel clubs in the English-speaking world, only the United Kennel Club in the U.S. recognises the German Hound, in its Scenthound Group. The German Hound also may be recognised by any of the many minor registries, rare breed groups, hunting clubs, and internet registry businesses under its original name, discarded antique names, translations of the name, or variations on the name. The German Hound is strictly a hunting dog, and seldom seen outside its native country. Outside its home country, purchasers of dogs represented as German Hounds should research the dog's background, especially if it is registered with one of the minor clubs that require little to no documentation before accepting a dog or litter for registration.

== Names ==
Historically, the term Bracke was used in German to mean scenthounds. Brack is an old Low German word for a coastal marsh periodically inundated by storm surges with salt water – the English word brackish. In Europe, scenthounds are usually separated into running hounds (free running packs, which either drive the game back to the hunter, or the hunter follows as they run, or the hunter waits until the dogs' cries communicate that game has been found and held, and then goes to that spot) and leash hounds (which follow the game or track wounded or dead game while being held on a leash by the hunter). The Bracke are usually used as running hounds, in packs, to hunt rabbits or foxes in a type of hunt called Brackade.

== Health and character ==
No specific diseases or claims of extraordinary health have been documented for this breed. According to the original German breed club, although it is a hunting dog, it is affectionate and benefits from living with the family rather than in a kennel. It is a very persistent tracking dog with a good sense of direction.

== Related breeds ==
The German Hound is related to the Westfälische Dachsbracke (Westphalian Dachsbracke, FCI No. 100) and the Drever, also called the Swedish Dachsbracke (FCI No. 130). The Finnenbracke (FCI No. 51) is from Finland. The Alpenländische Dachsbracke (Alpine Dachsbracke, FCI No. 254) is from Tyrol, in Austria, as is the Tiroler Bracke (Tyrolean Hound, FCI No. 68).

== See also ==
- List of dog breeds
- Hunting dog
- Hound
- Scent hound
