= SEL1L =

Protein-coding gene in the species Homo sapiens

Identifiers
- Aliases: SEL1L, PRO1063, SEL1-LIKE, SEL1L1, SEL1L ERAD E3 ligase adaptor subunit, ERAD E3 ligase adaptor subunit, Hrd3, SEL1L adaptor subunit of ERAD E3 ubiquitin ligase
- External IDs: OMIM: 602329; MGI: 1329016; HomoloGene: 31286; GeneCards: SEL1L; OMA:SEL1L - orthologs

Gene location (Human)
Chr.	Chromosome 14 (human)
Band	14q31.1	Start	81,471,547 bp
Band	14q31.1	End	81,533,853 bp

Gene location (Mouse)
Chr.	Chromosome 12 (mouse)
Band	12|12 D3	Start	91,772,817 bp
Band	12|12 D3	End	91,815,931 bp
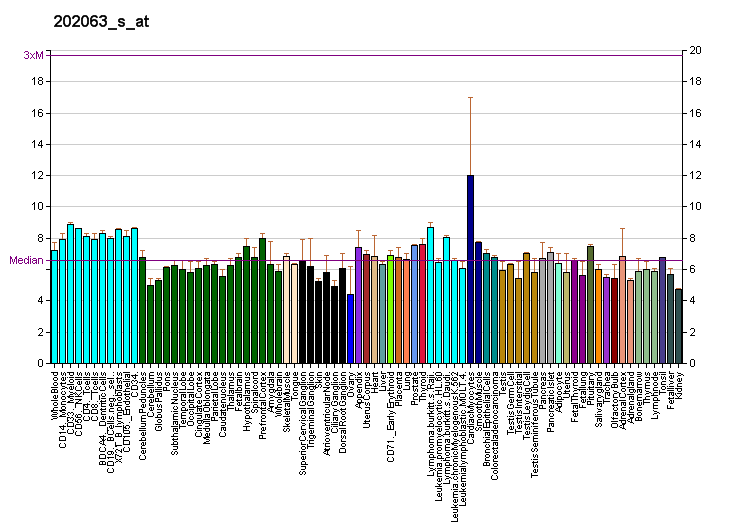

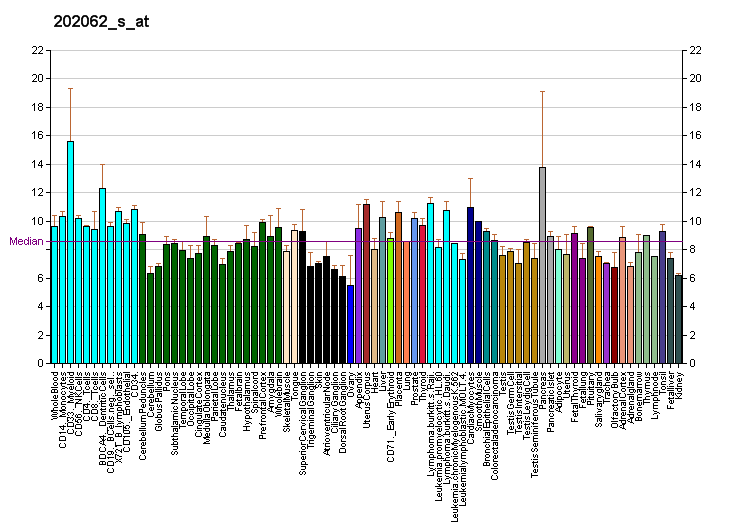

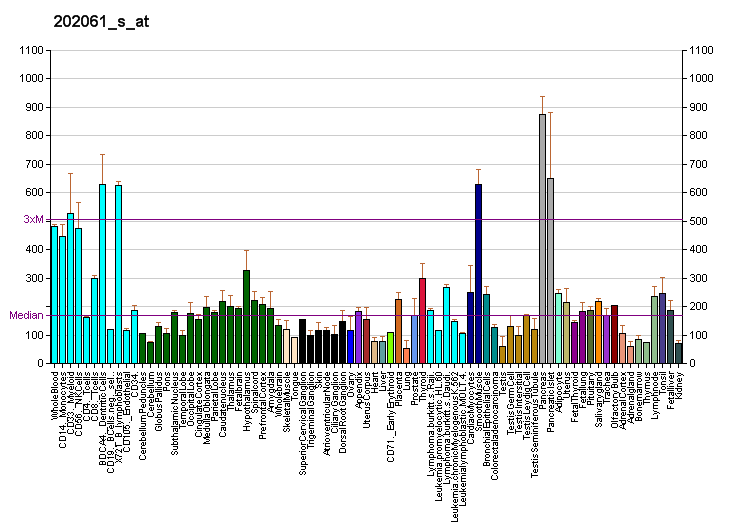
RNA expression pattern
Bgee	Human / Mouse (ortholog); Top expressed in: body of pancreas; epithelium of colon; bone marrow cell; pericardium; decidua; cardia; pylorus; islet of Langerhans; jejunal mucosa; mucosa of ileum / Top expressed in: submandibular gland; lacrimal gland; parotid gland; cumulus cell; Paneth cell; vestibular membrane of cochlear duct; pancreas; internal carotid artery; Rostral migratory stream; epithelium of stomach; More reference expression data
BioGPS	More reference expression data
Gene ontology
Molecular function	protein binding
Cellular component	integral component of membrane; Hrd1p ubiquitin ligase complex; endoplasmic reticulum membrane; Derlin-1 retrotranslocation complex; membrane; endoplasmic reticulum; endoplasmic reticulum quality control compartment; Hrd1p ubiquitin ligase ERAD-L complex
Biological process	Notch signaling pathway; protein stabilization; retrograde protein transport, ER to cytosol; ubiquitin-dependent ERAD pathway; response to endoplasmic reticulum stress; endoplasmic reticulum mannose trimming; triglyceride metabolic process; protein secretion; ERAD pathway; transmembrane transport
Sources:Amigo / QuickGO
Orthologs
Species	Human	Mouse
Entrez	6400	20338
Ensembl	ENSG00000071537	ENSMUSG00000020964
UniProt	Q9UBV2	Q9Z2G6
RefSeq (mRNA)	NM_001244984; NM_005065	NM_001039089; NM_011344
RefSeq (protein)	NP_001231913; NP_005056	NP_001034178; NP_035474
Location (UCSC)	Chr 14: 81.47 – 81.53 Mb	Chr 12: 91.77 – 91.82 Mb
PubMed search
- Wikidata
View/Edit Human	View/Edit Mouse

Protein sel-1 homolog 1 is a protein that in humans is encoded by the SEL1L gene.

== Clinical relevance ==
A mutation in this gene in Finnish Hound dogs have been implicated in cases of cerebellar ataxia. Mutant cells suffer disruptions in their endoplasmic reticula, leading to disease.
