= Bavarian Mountain Hound =

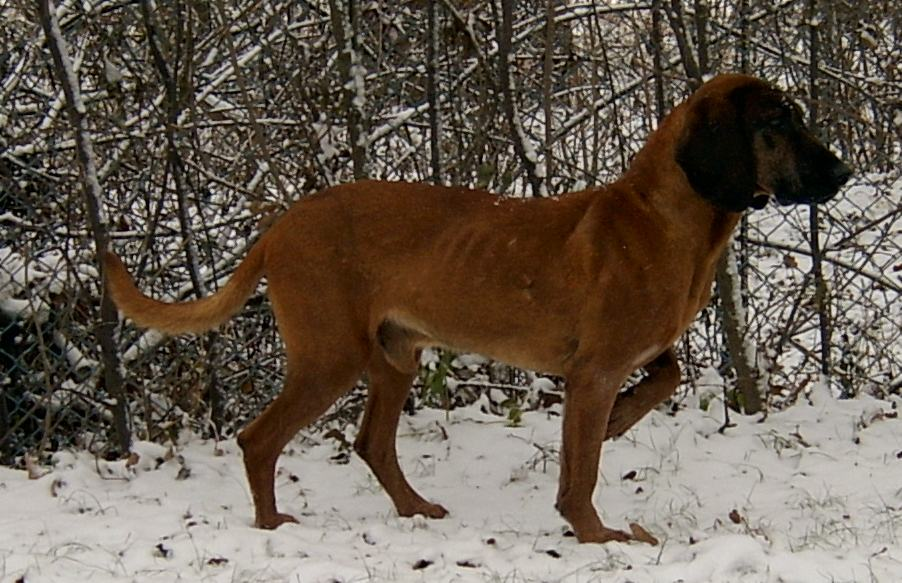
Traits
Height	Males	47–52 cm (19–20 in)
	Females	44–48 cm (17–19 in)
- Coat: short, dense, or wirey
- Colour: Deer red, tan, fawn, chestnut, black head/face/ears
Kennel club standards
- VDH: standard
- Fédération Cynologique Internationale: standard

The Bavarian Mountain Hound (German: Bayerischer Gebirgsschweißhund) is a breed of dog from Germany. As a scent hound, it has been used in Germany since the early 20th century to trail wounded game.

== Description ==
The Bavarian Mountain Hound's head is strong and elongated. The skull is relatively broad and slightly domed. It has a pronounced stop and a slightly curved nosebridge. The muzzle should be broad with solid jaws, and its lips fully covering the mouth. Its nose is black or dark red with wide nostrils. Its ears are high set and medium in length. They are broader at the base and rounded at the tips, hanging heavily against the head. Its body is slightly longer than it is tall and slightly raised at the rump. The neck medium in length, strong, with a slight dewlap. Topline sloping slightly upward from withers to hindquarters. Chest well-developed, long, moderately wide, and well let-down with a slight tuck-up. It has a long, fairly straight croup and solid back. While its tail is set on high, medium in length and hanging to the hock, carried level to the ground or hanging down.

The Bavarian Mountain Hound is a medium-sized dog, typically weighing between 20 and 30 kg. Males are 47 to 52 cm (18.5 to 20.5 in) tall, while females are 44 to 48 cm (17.5 to 19 in).

The coat is short, thick and glossy, lying very flat against the body, and moderately harsh. It is finer on the head and ears, harsher and longer on the abdomen, legs, and tail. Its coat can come in shades of black-masked fawn, red, or brindle, sometimes with a white marking on the chest.

=== Temperament ===
Bavarian Mountain Hounds are calm, poised, and very attached to their family but reserved with strangers. When hunting, they are hard, single-minded, and persistent. They are not often seen as pets; most are still employed by as hunters and trackers.

== Health ==
A 2009 study found an inbreeding coefficient of 4.5% among registered dogs between 1992 and 2004, the lowest of the three scent-hound breeds studied.

== History ==
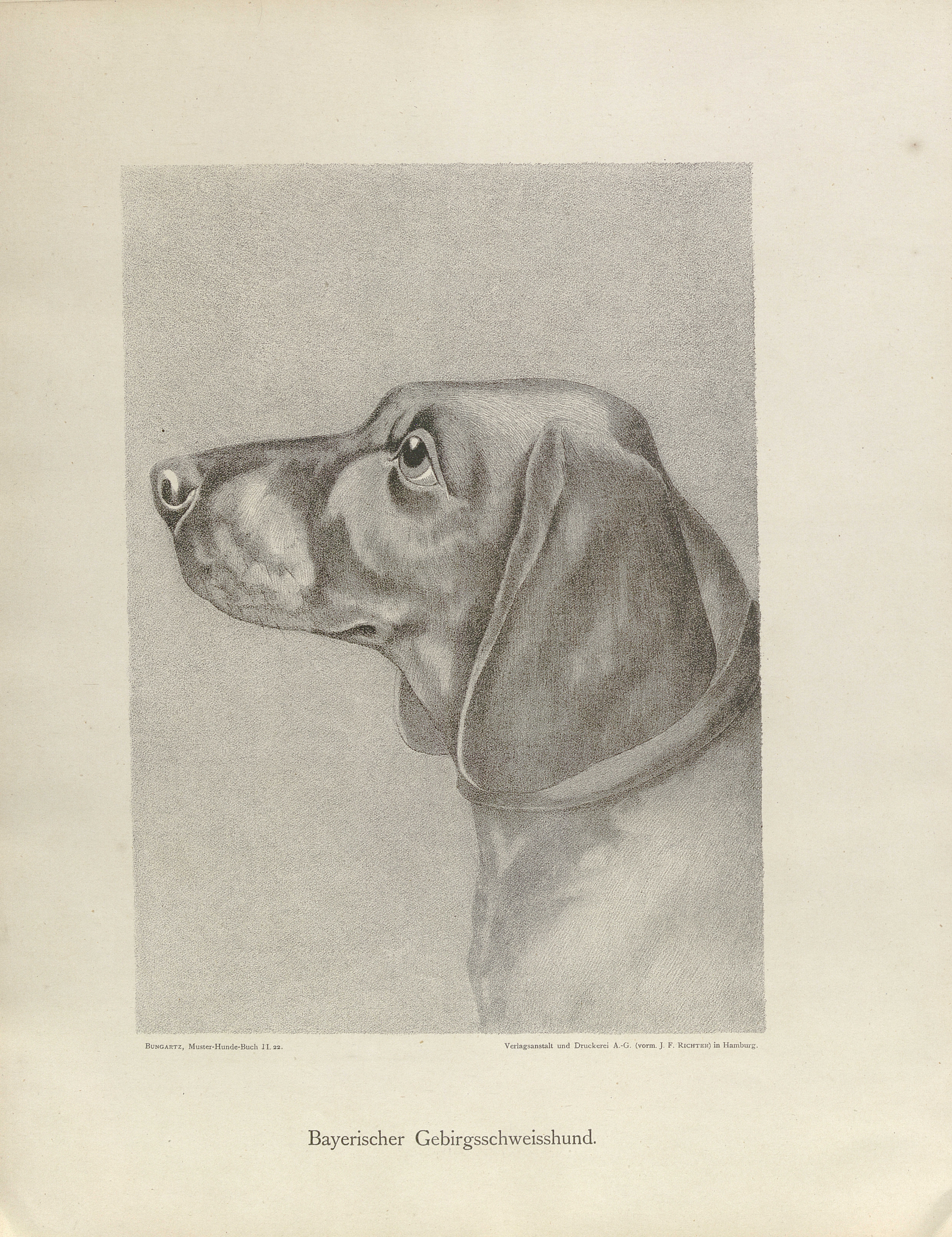
Bavarian Mountain Hound on an 1890 illustration

The Bavarian Mountain Dog was developed in the 19th century by crossbreeding the Hanover Hound with the Tyrolean Hound and other hunting dogs. The result was a hunting dog ideal for the work in the mountains, smaller and more agile in broken mountain terrain. The Bavarian Mountain Dog specialises in tracking injured big game such as deer, following the traces of blood the prey loses after being shot.

In 1912, the "Klub für Bayrische Gebirgsschweißhunde", (Club for Bavarian Mountain hound), was founded in Munich. Afterwards, the breed gained popularity in Austria and Hungary.

== See also ==
- List of dog breeds
