= Roger Bracke =

Belgian artist

A self portrait of Bracke and his spouse

Roger Bracke (17 March 1913 – 1993) was a Belgian sculptor, draftsman and watercolorist.

== Biography ==
Roger Edouard Bracke was born in Lokeren, East Flanders, Belgium, on 17 March 1913. He studied at the Ghent Academy. In 1949 he became teacher of drawing at the Lokeren Atheneum. He later became a sculptor, sculpting many public monuments. Among his works are the blue stone monument In het land der blinden is éénoog koning in Puyenbroeck, Wachtebeke (1976), and the Vredesmonument, located in front of the Lokeren railway station.

Bracke won the 1961 Prijs Groenruimte and was named an honorary member of the Accademia Internazionale Tommaso Campanella in Rome.

He died in 1993, aged 80.

== Gallery ==
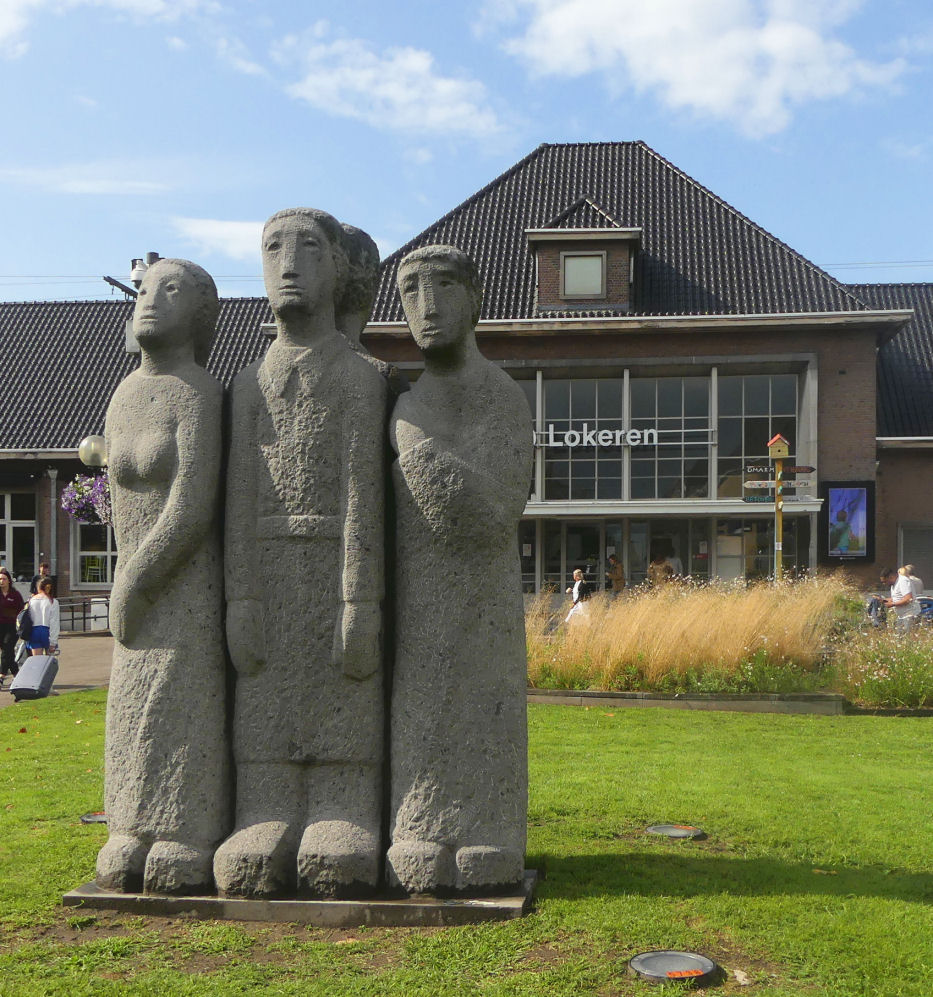
Vredesmonument, Lokeren 2023
