= Hanover Hound =

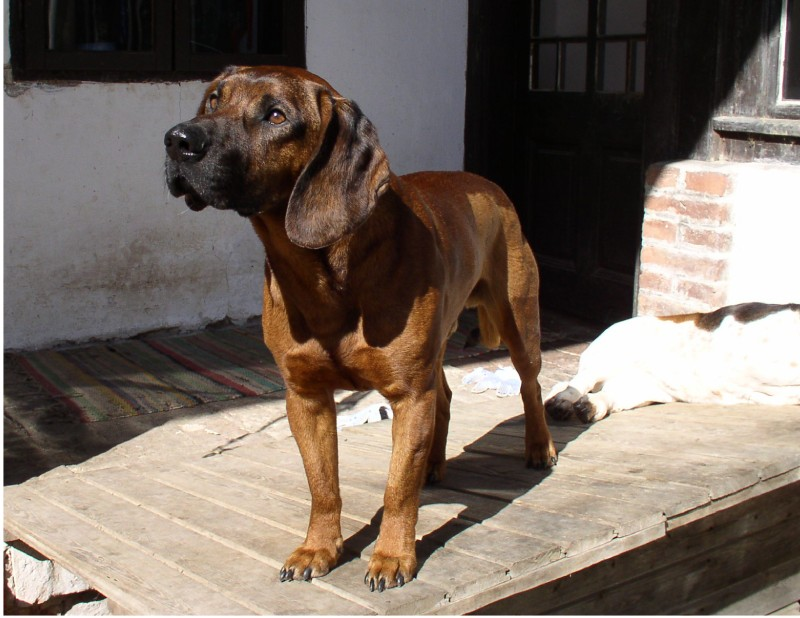
- Other names: Hanoverian Hound; Hanoverian Scenthound; Hannover'scher Schweisshund
- Origin: Germany
Kennel club standards
- Fédération Cynologique Internationale: standard

The Hanover Hound is a breed of dog sometimes referred to as a Hanoverian Hound, Hanoverian Scent hound, and Hannover Schweißhund. The origins of the Hanover hound trace back to the Celtic period as a direct decedent of the lead hound. The Hanover hound is described as a blood hound, primary used for tracking blood from wounded animals. It is a hunting and tracking dog descended from bloodhounds of medieval times. It was first introduced into France in the 1980s and is still a very rare breed. It was crossbred with the Bavarian Hound, which gave rise to the Bavarian Mountain Hound.

== Description ==
=== Appearance ===
These short-haired dogs range in colour from light to dark reddish fawn with a brindled appearance. They may also have a mask. Overall, the Hanoverian Hound is sturdily built with a large head, strong jaws and a deep chest. Adult males stand between 19.5 and 21.5 inches (50–55 cm) and weigh 66–88 pounds. Adult females are usually slightly smaller, standing 19–21 inches (48–53 cm) in height and weighing 55 to 70 pounds (25–35 kg). The forehead is slightly wrinkled. The skull is broadest between the ears and slightly rounded. The ears of a Hanover hound are high, broad, and smooth, usually bluntly rounded at the tips. The tail is high set, long, and barely curved

=== Temperament ===
Like any working dog, the Hanover Hound fares best living in an area where he can exercise and would not be ideal for city living. Similar to other working dogs, the Hanoverian hound is described as having a calm and assured temperament and a persistent and single-minded nature when tracking. Hanover hounds tend to keep to themselves around strangers; on the other hand, they are kind and friendly towards other dogs.

=== History ===
The ancestry of the Hanover hound can be linked to the Celtic people in Central Europe, from around 500 BC. The Celts used the Segusiehund, which evolved from the Celtic hound. Keeping its tracking ability and powerful build, it developed into the lead hound, with distinguishing characteristics such as a blunt muzzle and a broad nose.

The Hanover Hound developed almost directly from the Lead Hound. Since the era of Charlemagne, the lead hound has held a strong standing in hunting. These dogs were utilized to locate strong stags and wild boars.

After the advent of firearms revolutionized hunting, it created a demand for dogs capable of tracking wounded prey. Which made the Lead Hound ideally suited for this task, leading its transition into the” Blood Hound”.

In 1885, the Hanover hound was given its name “Hanoverian Bloodhound” / “German Bloodhound”. The founding meeting of The Hirschmann Association took the task of preserving the Hanoverian Scent hound breed.

In 1912, the Hanoverian scent hound was crossed with the Bavarian mountain scent hound, a lighter, more agile tracking dog. Which was better suited for rough terrian.

The United Kennel Club (UKC) recognized the Hanoverian hound on January 1, 1996.

=== Breed recognition ===
The Hanover hound was officially recognized by the Fédération Cynologique Internationale (FCI) in 1964, under Scent hounds and related breeds.

The United Kennel Club (UKC) recognized the Hanoverian hound, classified in the scent hound group on January 1, 1996.

== See also ==
- List of dog breeds
