= Tyrolean Hound =

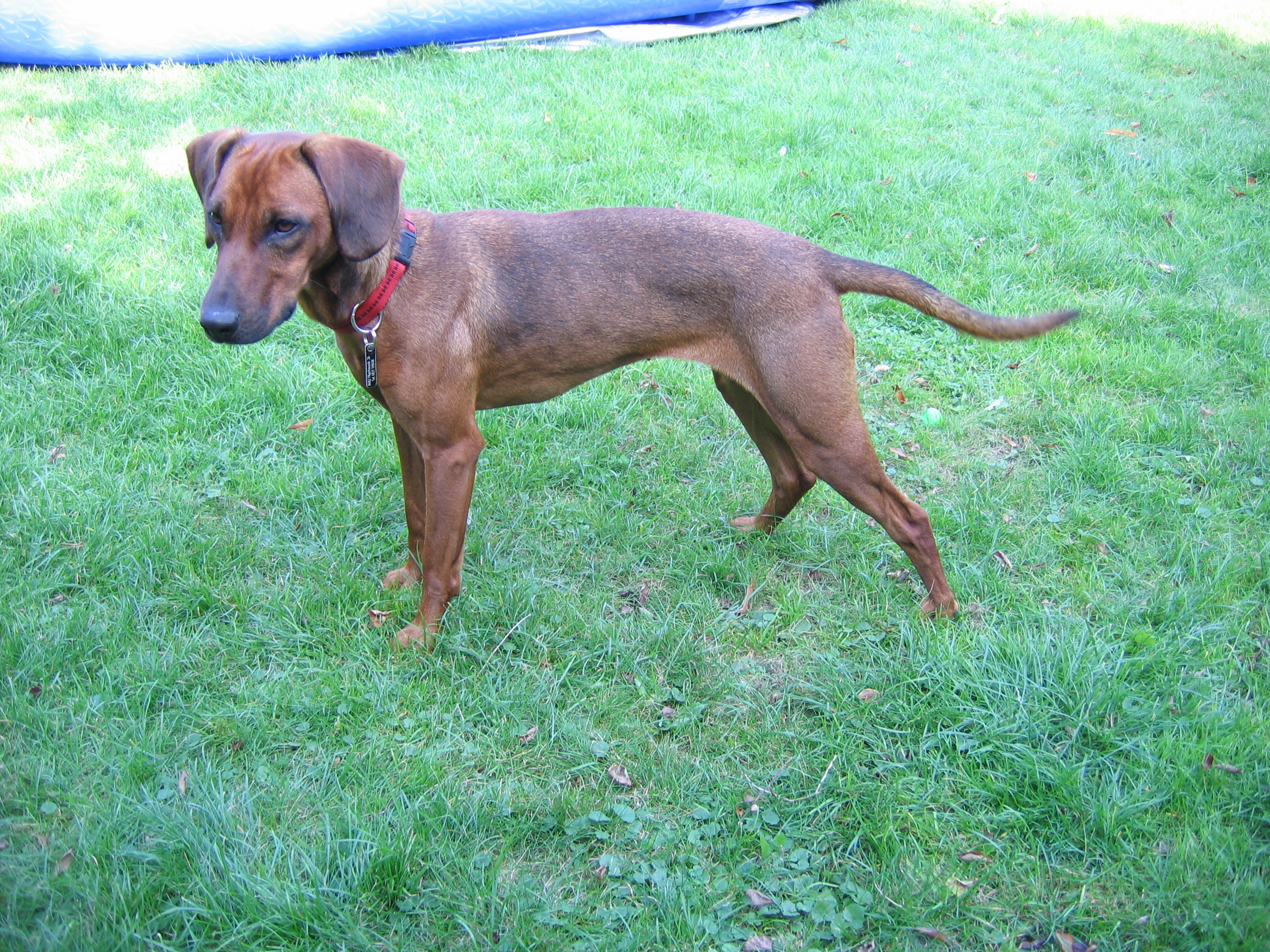
- A Tyrolean Hound
- Other names: Tiroler Bracke; Tyroler Bracke
- Origin: Austria
Kennel club standards
- Fédération Cynologique Internationale: standard

The Tyrolean Hound is a breed of dog that originated in Tyrol also called the Tiroler Bracke or Tyroler Bracke. They are scent hounds that descended from the Celtic hounds in the late 1800s, mainly for their hunting skills. They are hardworking, passionate, and independent dogs not known for their size, but rather their intelligence. For that reason, hunters can regularly use these dogs to catch their prey, wounded or otherwise. Their ability to stretch over long distances, on rough hot or cold terrain for their prey is also another perk of keeping this dog by your side. Hunters do have to worry about injuries to their dog, however, along with the common injuries that these dogs obtain throughout their life, like hip dysplasia or ear infections. Barring any injuries, these dogs tend to live an energetic life for about 12-14 years, and tend to be an overall healthy and robust dog.

== Description and history ==
The Tyrolean Hound, also known as the Tyroler Bracke, is a breed of scent hound originally developed in the 1800s from the Bracke hounds and the Celtic hounds. It was first bred in Tyrol as a dog adapted to hunting in the snow. Emperor Maximilian I used this hound for hunting hare and fox and for tracking wounded game. Breeding began in 1860, and then in 1896 the first standard of breeding was published. Followed shortly thereafter, the Tyrolean Hound was recognized as their own breed in 1908. It was not until 2006, that the Tyrolean Hound was recognized by the United Kennel Club.

As with dogs that come from hardworking scent hound breeds, the Tyrolean hound was bred for their hunting ability. The breed is known for their excellent ability in being able to maneuver through mountainous or heavily wooded areas, and for their amazing scenting skills. This is all made possible with the size of the Tyrolean Hound. It tends to be a medium to large dog, measuring in at about 18.5 to 24 inches tall, and weighing about 35 to 60 pounds for males. Females tend to be smaller physically, only growing to be about 16.5 to 19 inches tall, however, both have a nice flowing outline and tend to be fairly muscular. The Tyrolean Hound, whether male or female, also has a thick double coat, with a coarse undercoat, as opposed to fine. They also tend to have the three main colors of red, black, and tan, with patches of white mixed in between.

=== Body breakdown ===
==== Head ====
The head of the Tyrolean Hound is fairly broad with a slight arch going down the middle. This arch continues into the deep and straight muzzle of the dog, ending down at either a black or brown nose, with black is more desirable.

The teeth of the Tyrolean Hound should be spaced, and it would be normal to notice that the dog is missing one or two premolars. Above the snout, the eyes are not so deeply set, and tend to be dark brown, large, and round. Laying on top of the eye, the third eyelid should be pigmented and the eye rims should be close fitting. Above the eyes, this medium-sized hound has broad flat ears set high on the head with rounded ends. The ears can even reach up to the end of the nose when pulled forward.

==== Body ====
The body is compact and rectangular in shape. They have a thick double coat including a coarse undercoat. There are two main colors, red and black with some tan, both of which may have white markings. It has a fast gait and can be used for either tracking or hunting. They have a deep chest that is moderately broad with a muscular fore-chest. The shoulder blades and upper arms are sloping and form a near right angle. The withers are pronounced and the croup slopes gently down the dog. The forelegs are straight with a medium bone, while the hind legs are well feathered, broad, and muscular. Lastly, the tail is set high on the back with a saber curve. The tail is carried high when the dog is excited, and preferably presents feathered with a thick brush of fur.

== Temperament ==
Like many working dogs, the Tyrolean hound is known to be highly active, easily trainable, and affectionate. For these reasons, these dogs are commonly kept as family pets, especially among families with big yards or constant access to an open field.

The Tyrolean Hound is an independent hunting dog that can work alone and track wounded game over long distances. It is used for hunting in wooded and mountainous areas and has a quick, enduring gait. The breed is known for its strong sense of smell and persistence when following a scent.

== Health ==
A German study analysing the genetic diversity of the Bavarian Mountain Hound, Hanoverian Hound, and Tyrolean Hound found the Tyrolean to have the highest level of inbreeding: inbreeding coefficients were 4.5%, 6.8%, and 9.5% respectively and the inbreeding rate per generation was 0.69%, 0.98%, and 1.88% respectively. The effective population size was 26.5 for the Tyrolean Hound.

== See also ==
- List of dog breeds
