= Westphalian Dachsbracke =

Westphalian Dachsbracke Westphälische Dachsbracke
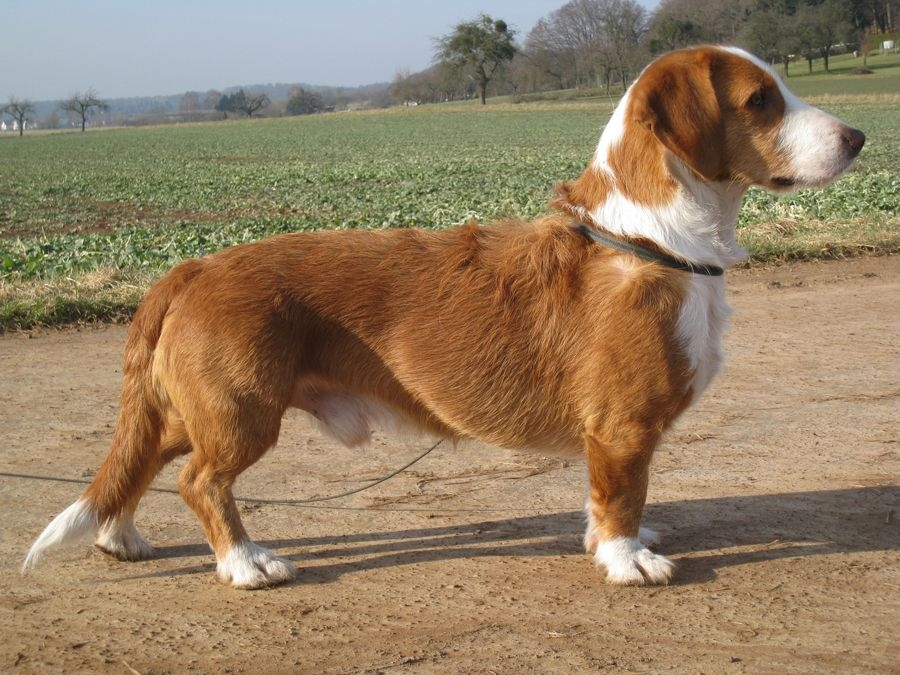
- Other names: Westphalian Hound
- Origin: Germany
Kennel club standards
- VDH: standard
- Fédération Cynologique Internationale: standard

The Westphalian Dachsbracke is a small, short-legged scenthound, a breed of dog originating in Westphalia, a region of Germany. The Westphalian Dachsbracke was used in Sweden to develop the Drever.

== Appearance ==
The Westphalian Dachsbracke (Westfälische Dachsbracke, German for Badger hound) is a small, short-legged version of the Deutsche Bracke, and very similar in size and appearance to the Drever (FCI No. 130), but 2 cm shorter (the Drever was first registered in Sweden in 1910 as the Westfälische Dachsbracke; the name was changed in 1947.)

The Westphalian Dachsbracke stands about 30 to 38 cm (12 to 15 in) high at the withers. It has medium-long drooped ears, short legs, and a long tail which is set high and carried up. The coat has short fur, usually tricolor (red to yellow with a black saddle), with white markings called Bracken marks - a white muzzle, chest, legs, collar, and tip of the tail, and a blaze on the head. The chest is more narrow than the Dachshund's chest, and the legs are longer.

== History ==
The Westphalian Dachsbracke was first described as a variety of German Hound in 1886. It was recognized by the Verband für das Deutsche Hundewesen (German Kennel Club) in 1935 with its current name, and by the Fédération Cynologique Internationale as breed number 100 in Group 6 (scenthounds), Section 1.3 (small hounds). The Westphalian Dachsbracke is the ancestor breed of the Swedish scenthound, the Drever. Of the major kennel clubs in the English-speaking world, only the United Kennel Club in the US recognises the Westphalian Dachsbracke, in its scenthound group. The Westphalian Dachsbracke also may be recognised by any of the many minor registries, rare breed groups, hunting clubs, and internet dog registry businesses under its original name or variations on the name. Hunting use of the Westphalian Dachsbracke has been mostly supplanted by the Drever, and the Westphalian Dachsbracke is seldom seen even in its home country; purchasers of dogs represented as Westphalian Dachsbracke should research the dog's background, especially if it is registered with one of the minor clubs that require little to no documentation before accepting a dog or litter for registration.

== Names and etymology ==
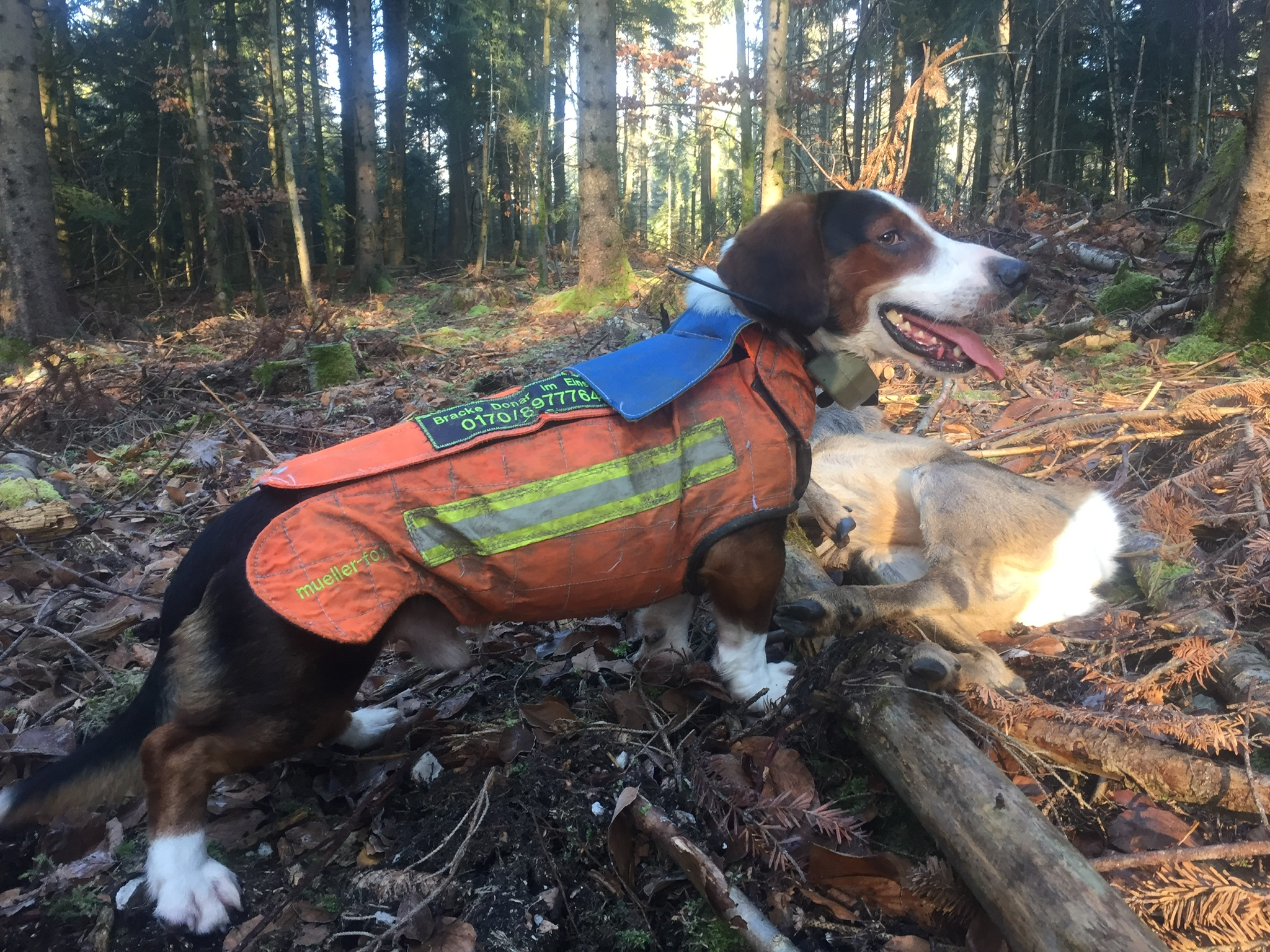
Westphalian Dachsbracke with dog protection vest and tracking device hunting roe deer

Dachs is German for badger, a term used for hunting dogs with short legs. The name Dachsbracke may reflect that the Dachsbracke dogs were bred down in size by crossbreeding long-legged Bracken with the Dachshund. Historically, the term Bracke was used in German to mean the scenthounds. Brack is an old Low German word for a coastal marsh periodically inundated by storm surges with salt water (related to the English word brackish). In Europe, scenthounds are usually separated into running hounds (free running packs, which either drive the game back to the hunter, or the hunter follows as they run, or the hunter waits until the dogs' cries communicate that game has been found and held, and then goes to that spot) or leash hounds (which follow the game or track wounded or dead game while being held on a leash by the hunter.) The Bracke are usually used as running hounds, in packs, to hunt rabbits or foxes in a type of hunt called Brackade. The Dachsbracke are used for hunting today mainly in Scandinavia and in alpine regions.

The Deutsche Bracke (German Bracke, also called the German Hound, Fédération Cynologique Internationale breed number 299) is another breed of Bracke, the first one registered as a separate breed, in 1900. The Alpenländische Dachsbracke (Alpine Dachsbracke, breed number 254) is from Tyrol, in Austria. The Drever, breed number 130, is also called the Swedish Dachsbracke.

== See also ==
- List of dog breeds
- Hunting dog
- Hound
- Scent hound
