= Drever =

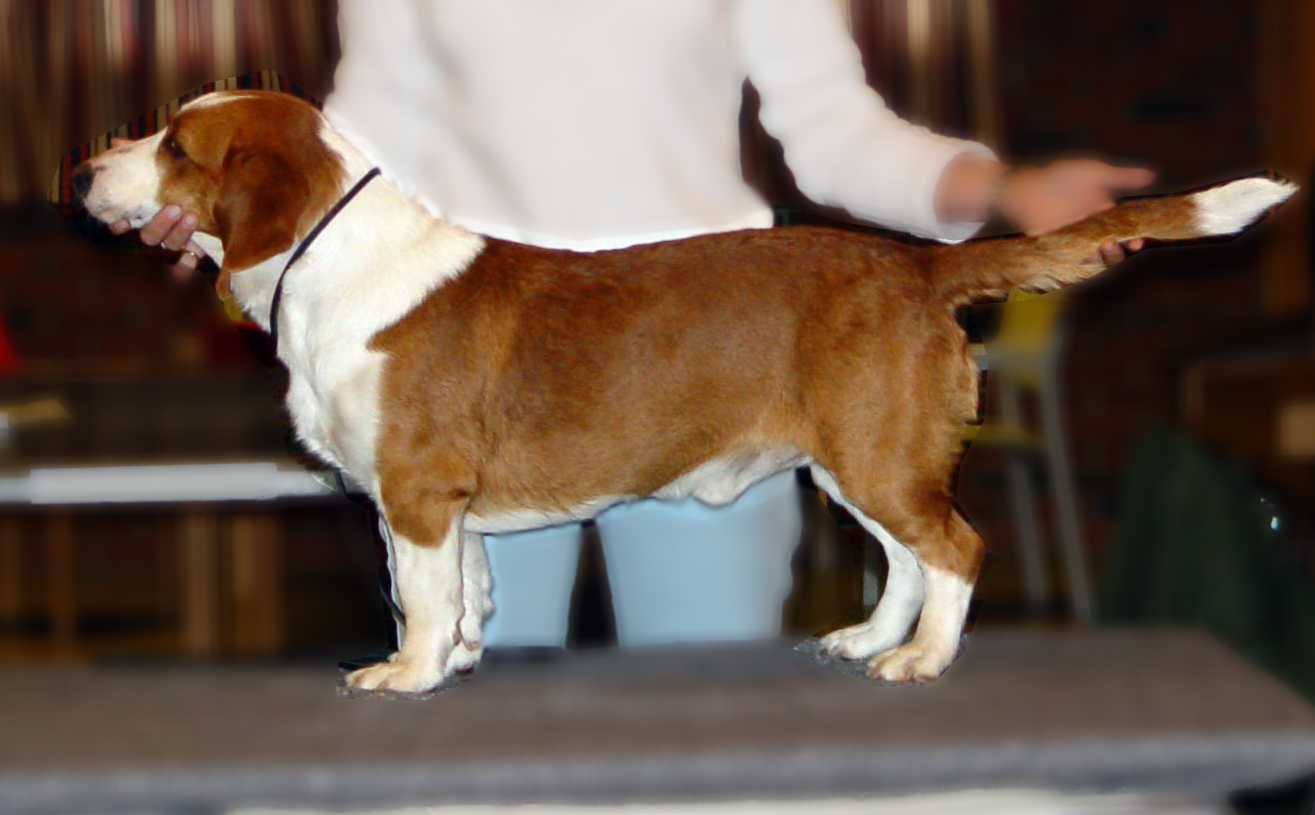
- Drever
- Other names: Swedish Dachsbracke
- Origin: Sweden
Kennel club standards
- Fédération Cynologique Internationale: standard

The Drever is a breed of dog, a short-legged scenthound from Sweden used for hunting deer and other game. The Drever is descended from the Westphalian Dachsbracke, a type of German hound called Bracke. The breed name Drever was chosen through a contest in 1947.

== Appearance ==
The Drever's most noticeable characteristics are its long body and short legs, inherited from the Westphalian Dachsbracke, but as a working dog, these features are not exaggerated. It has short fur, and is of any color with white markings (but not all white, which has been linked to deafness.) The breed has the typical drop (hanging) ears of a hound, and a long tail. The maximum height of a Drever is 38 cm (15 ins) at the withers, which is about 15 cm (approx. 6 ins) shorter than a long legged hunting hound with the same size body. The Westphalian Dachsbracke is about 2 cm (less than an inch) shorter than the Drever.

== Hunting ==
Most breeds with similar physical traits are bred for a single purpose, but the Drever has been bred to hunt sizes of game, both hares and roe deer, and fox and red deer. The Drever has a lot of stamina, and has become a popular hunting hound for deer hunters in northern Norway, Sweden, and Finland as a change in legislation allowed the use of Drevers in deer hunting. Roe deer are nervous quarry, and the hounds which are used to hunt them must move slowly, especially in areas where heavy snow can be expected in late autumn. This is given as the reason for breeding of a dog with a medium-sized body but short legs.

The Drever in Sweden is usually kept as a hunting hound and is not usually found as a pet.

== History and recognition ==
The Drever is a Swedish breed originating with the Westphalian Dachsbracke (a small hound for tracking deer), brought from Germany to Sweden around 1910, and crossbred with other hounds to adjust "to Swedish terrain and game." By the 1940s, there were two distinctive sizes of the Dachsbracke, and a newspaper contest was held in 1947 to choose the new name for the slightly larger variety; Drever was chosen, from the Swedish word drev, referring to a type of hunt where the dogs drive the game towards the hunter. The Drever was then recognised by the Swedish Kennel Club as a separate breed in 1947. The breed is recognised internationally by the Fédération Cynologique Internationale, in Group 6 Scenthounds and related breeds, Section 1.3, Small-sized Hounds.

The Drever was recognized by the Canadian Kennel Club in 1956 in the Hound Group, and in 1996 by the United Kennel Club (UKC, USA) in its Scenthound Group. The breed is also recognized by a long list of minor registries, rare breed groups, hunting clubs, and internet registry businesses, and is promoted in North America as a rare breed pet. It is not currently recognized by The Kennel Club (UK), the Australian National Kennel Council, or the New Zealand Kennel Club. The American Kennel Club currently recognizes Drever in its Foundation Stock Service program.

== Health ==
In a 2005 Swedish study of insurance records 45% of Drevers died by the age of 10, higher than the overall rate at 35% of dogs dying by the age of 10.

== See also ==
- List of dog breeds
- Westphalian Dachsbracke and the closely related Deutsche Bracke
- Dachshund, a short-legged Bracke
- Hunting dog
- Hound
