= Tatra Shepherd Dog =

Polish breed of dog

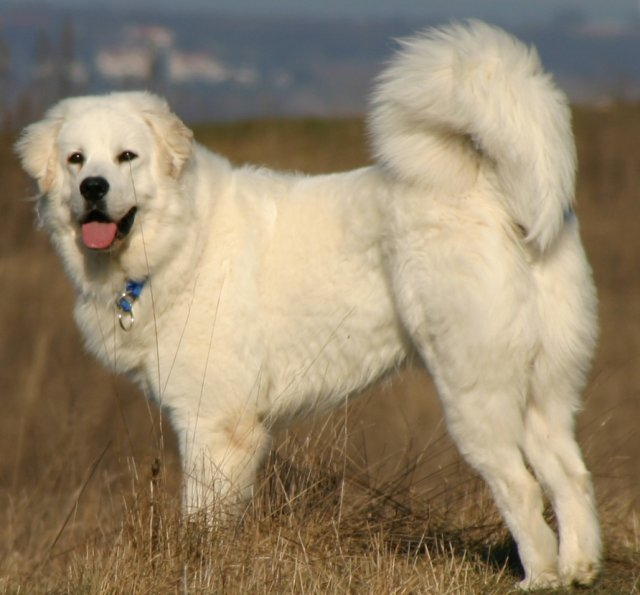
- Other names: Polski Owczarek Podhalański; Owczarek Tatrzański; Owczarek Podhalański; Polski Owczarek; Polish Tatra Sheepdog
- Origin: Poland
Traits
Height	Males	65–70 cm (26–28 in)
	Females	60–65 cm (24–26 in)
- Weight: 35–60 kg (77–132 lb)
Kennel club standards
- Fédération Cynologique Internationale: standard

The Tatra Shepherd Dog (Polish: Polski Owczarek Podhalański, lit. 'Polish Podhale Sheepdog') is a Polish breed of large flock guardian dog originating in the Tatra Mountains of the Podhale region of southern Poland. It was fully recognised by the Fédération Cynologique Internationale in 1963. It is one of five dog breeds originating in Poland, the others being the Polish Greyhound, the Polish Hound, the Polish Hunting Dog and the Polish Lowland Sheepdog.

== History ==
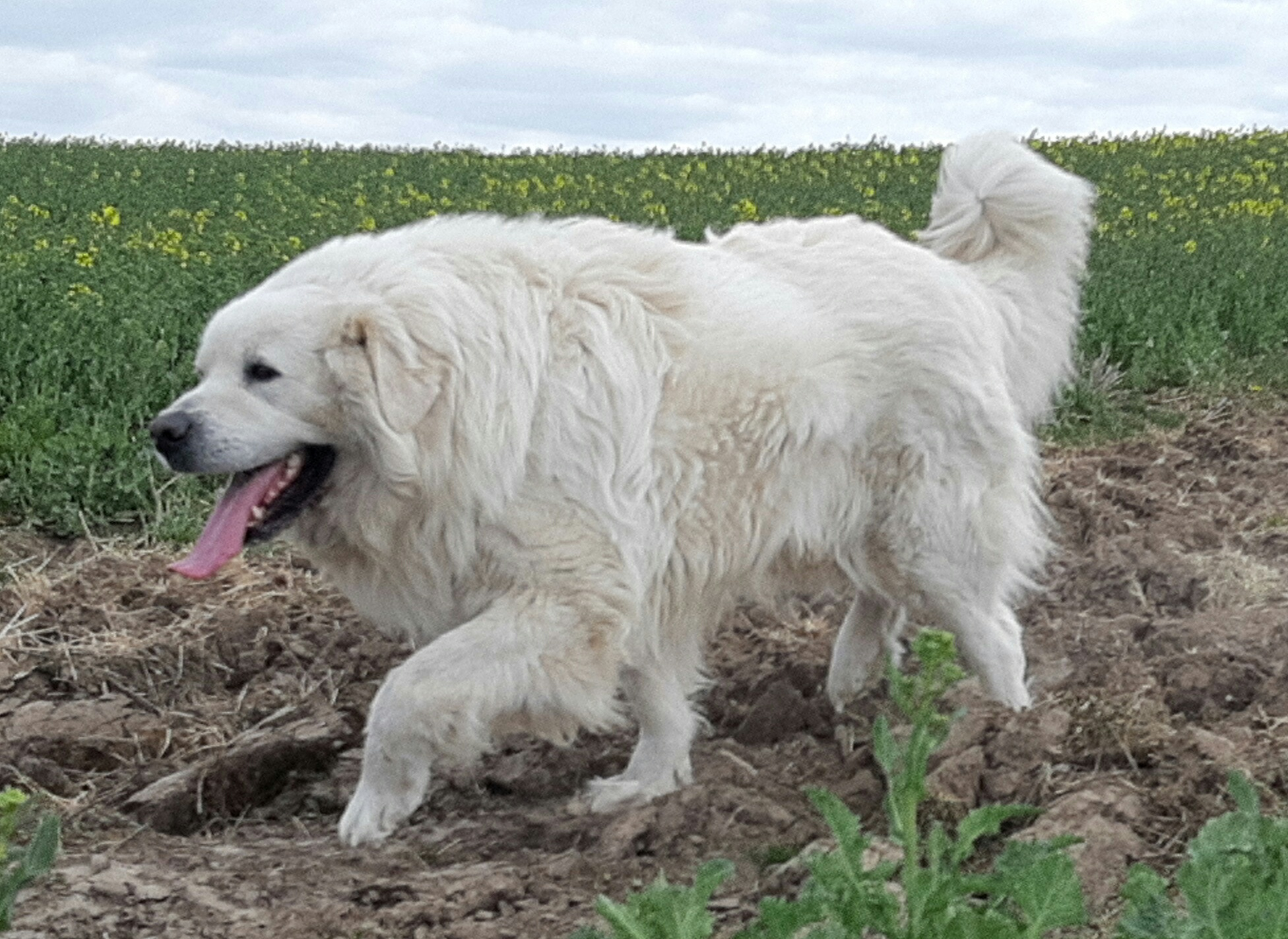

Like other large white European flock guardian dogs such as the Kuvasz, the Pastore Maremmano and the Pyrenean Mountain Dog, the Tatra Shepherd Dog is believed to derive from dogs brought from Asia by nomadic pastoralists.

The first show for these dogs was held in 1937. Because they were in isolated areas of the mountains, a small number of them survived the events of the Second World War. By 1954, when the first post-War show was organised, about 120 examples had been located; once the Związek Kynologiczny w Polsce, the Polish kennel club, was reconstituted after the War, shows were held in Kraków.

The breed was fully recognised by the Fédération Cynologique Internationale in 1963 or 1967. It is no longer found only its area of origin, but is distributed through much of Poland; some are in other countries.

The stud-book is open – unregistered dogs judged to be typical of the breed may be added to it. Approximately 300 puppies are born per year, in about 50 litters. Total annual new registrations with the kennel club were 473 in 2011 and 383 in 2012. Not all dogs of this type are registered in the stud-book. Currently, the AKC does not recognise the breed.

== Characteristics ==
The height at the withers is 65 to 70 centimetres (26 to 28 in) for males, 60 to 65 centimetres (24 to 26 in) for females.

They usually live for between ten and twelve years.

== Use ==
The Tatra Shepherd Dog was traditionally used as a flock guardian dog, to deter predators from attacking flocks of sheep in the mountainous terrain of the Podhale region. In modern Poland it is most often kept either as a guard dog or as a companion animal.

== See also ==
- List of dog breeds
