= Polbar =

Polish breed of chicken

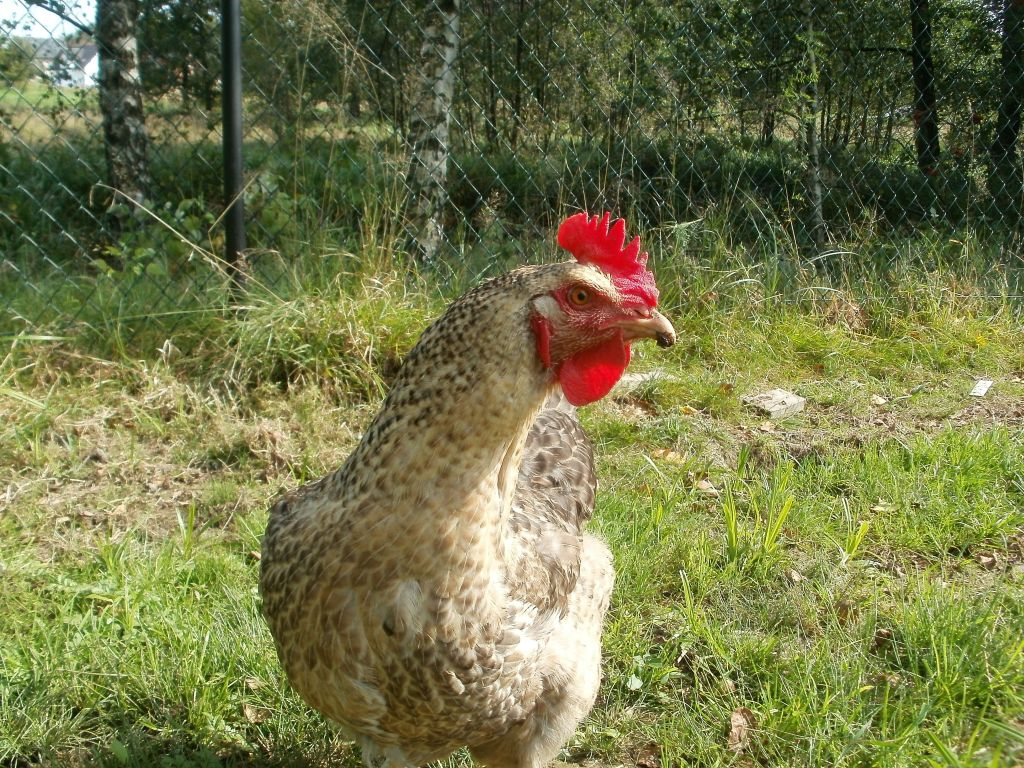
- Polbar hen
- Conservation status: FAO 2007: critical-maintained
- Country of origin: Poland
- Use: conservation only

Classification
- Chicken; Gallus gallus domesticus

The Polbar is a breed of chicken from Poland. It was created between 1946 and 1954 by Laura Kaufman, who crossed the native Polish Green-legged Partridge breed with American Plymouth Rock birds. The aim was to introduce the barred gene of the Plymouth Rock to make chicks auto-sexing – female chicks can be distinguished from males at one day old by the longer black eye-stripe.

There is one Polbar flock in Poland, at the Laura Kaufman Research Station of the University of Life Sciences of Lublin, in the eastern part of the country. It is kept for conservation only. At the end of 2014 there were 1100 birds.
