= Green-Legged Partridge =

Green-Legged Partridge may refer to:

- the Green-legged Partridge, a chicken breed from Poland
- the green-legged partridge, Arborophila chloropus, a species of partridge from Southeast Asia
