= Trybulski =

Trybulski (masculine), Trybulska (feminine) is a Polish surname. Notable people with the surname include:

- Maurycy Trybulski (1883–1944), Polish academic and animal breeder
- Walter J. Trybulski (died 1989), American politician
