= Hunting dog (disambiguation) =

A hunting dog is a canine that hunts with or for humans.

Hunting dog may also refer to:

- African hunting dog (Lycaon pictus), a canid native to Sub-Saharan Africa
  - Cape hunting dog (Lycaon pictus pictus), the nominate subspecies of African wild dog
- Hottentot hunting dog, another name for Africanis, a landrace of Southern African dogs
- Polish Hunting Dog, a breed of scent hound originating in Poland
