= Marek Świtoński =

Polish geneticist

Marek Świtoński (born 16 January 1954 in Leszno, Poland) is a Polish geneticist, Professor of Agricultural Sciences, a full member of the Polish Academy of Sciences, and a corresponding member of the Polish Academy of Arts and Sciences.

== Biography ==
In 1977, he graduated in agronomy from the Faculty of Agriculture at the Agricultural University of Poznan (now Poznan University of Life Sciences). At the same university, he obtained his PhD degree in 1981, based on the dissertation entitled Robertsonian Translocation in Arctic Foxes (Alopex lagopus) and Its Effect on Fertility, and his habilitation degree in 1988, based on the dissertation entitled B Chromosomes in the Red Fox (Vulpes vulpes): Their Nature, Distribution, Inheritance and Significance.

He completed postdoctoral research fellowships at the Swiss Federal Institute of Technology (ETH Zurich), Switzerland, in 1982, under the supervision of Gerald Stranzinger, and at the Swedish University of Agricultural Sciences in Uppsala in 1985–1986, under the supervision of Ingemar Gustavsson. In 1997, he was a visiting professor at ETH Zurich.

In 1993, he was awarded the title of Professor of Agricultural Sciences at the University of Poznan. In 1997, he was appointed full professor. From 1989 to 2021, he served as Head of the Department of Genetics and Animal Breeding, and from 1990 to 1996 as Vice-Rector for Academic Staff Development and International Cooperation.

He served as President of the Polish Genetics Society from 2001 to 2004. In 2007, he was elected a corresponding member of the Polish Academy of Sciences, and in 2023 he became a full member of the Academy. In 2010, he was appointed vice-president of the Poznan Branch of the Polish Academy of Sciences, and from 2019 to 2024 he served as its President. From 2000 to 2022, he was editor-in-chief of the Journal of Applied Genetics. He was a member of the Council for Science at the Ministry of Science and Information Technology from 2004 to 2008 and a member of the Council of the Foundation for Polish Science from 2008 to 2016. In 2026, he was elected a corresponding member of the Polish Academy of Arts and Sciences.

== Honours and awards ==
In 1999, he was awarded the Gold Cross of Merit (Poland), and in 2014, the Medal of the Commission of National Education (Poland). In 2023, he received honorary doctorate (doctor honoris causa) from the University of Life Sciences in Lublin, Poland, and in 2025, from the University of Agriculture in Krakow, Poland.
