= Green-legged Partridge =

Polish breed of chicken

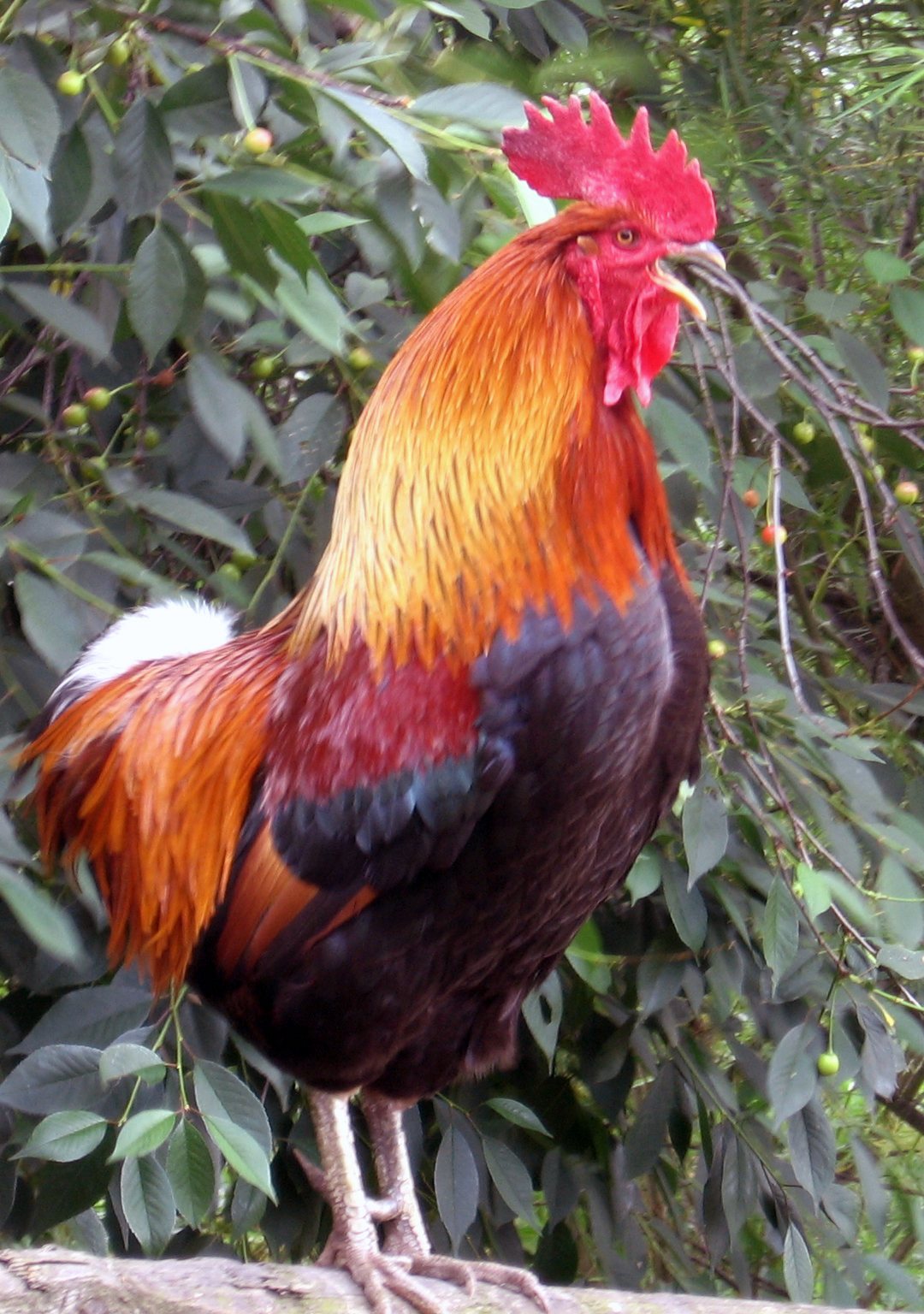
- Cock bird
- Conservation status: FAO 2007: endangered-maintained
- Other names: Polish: zielononóżka kuropatwiana
- Country of origin: Poland
- Use: conservation only

Traits
- Weight: Male: 2.55 kg; Female: 1.7 kg

Classification

Notes
- green shanks
- Chicken; Gallus gallus domesticus

The Green-legged Partridge is an old Polish breed of chicken. It is characterised by the unusual reseda green colour of the shanks.

== History ==
The Green-legged Partridge was first described by Bronisław Obfidowicz in 1879. In 1894 a flock was shown by Roman Ujejski at the General Provincial Exhibition in Lviv. A breed standard was drawn up by Maurycy Trybulski in 1921, and the breed was officially recognised in 1923. From 1930 it was raised in some 70% of the country. However, egg production was found to be variable, and the birds did not adapt well to intensive management. Numbers declined; between 1961 and 1973 its percentage of the national chicken population fell from 11.4% to 1–2%. Conservation efforts began in the 1970s.

Between 1946 and 1954 Laura Kaufman crossed the Green-legged Partridge breed with American Plymouth Rock birds to create the Polbar. The aim was to introduce the barred gene of the Plymouth Rock to make chicks auto-sexing – female Polbar chicks can be distinguished from males at one day old by the longer black eye-stripe.

There are two strains of the Green-legged Partridge, each with one flock; both populations are closed. The ZK strain has since 1945 been kept at Felin near Lublin, in the eastern part of the country, by the University of Life Sciences of that city. It is kept for conservation only. At the end of 2014 there were 1170 birds. The Z11 strain was kept at Życzyn from 1972 until 1995, when it was moved to the National Research Institute of Animal Production experimental station in Chorzelów.

== Use ==
The Green-legged Partridge is well adapted to extensive management; it forages well and is resistant to disease. It is not suited to intensive management, and becomes subject to cannibalism, feather loss and feather-pulling if kept closely enclosed. Egg-laying performance is generally poor; the yolk of the eggs has a low cholesterol content compared to that found in other breeds. Both meat and eggs have good flavour. The breed is kept only for reasons of conservation.

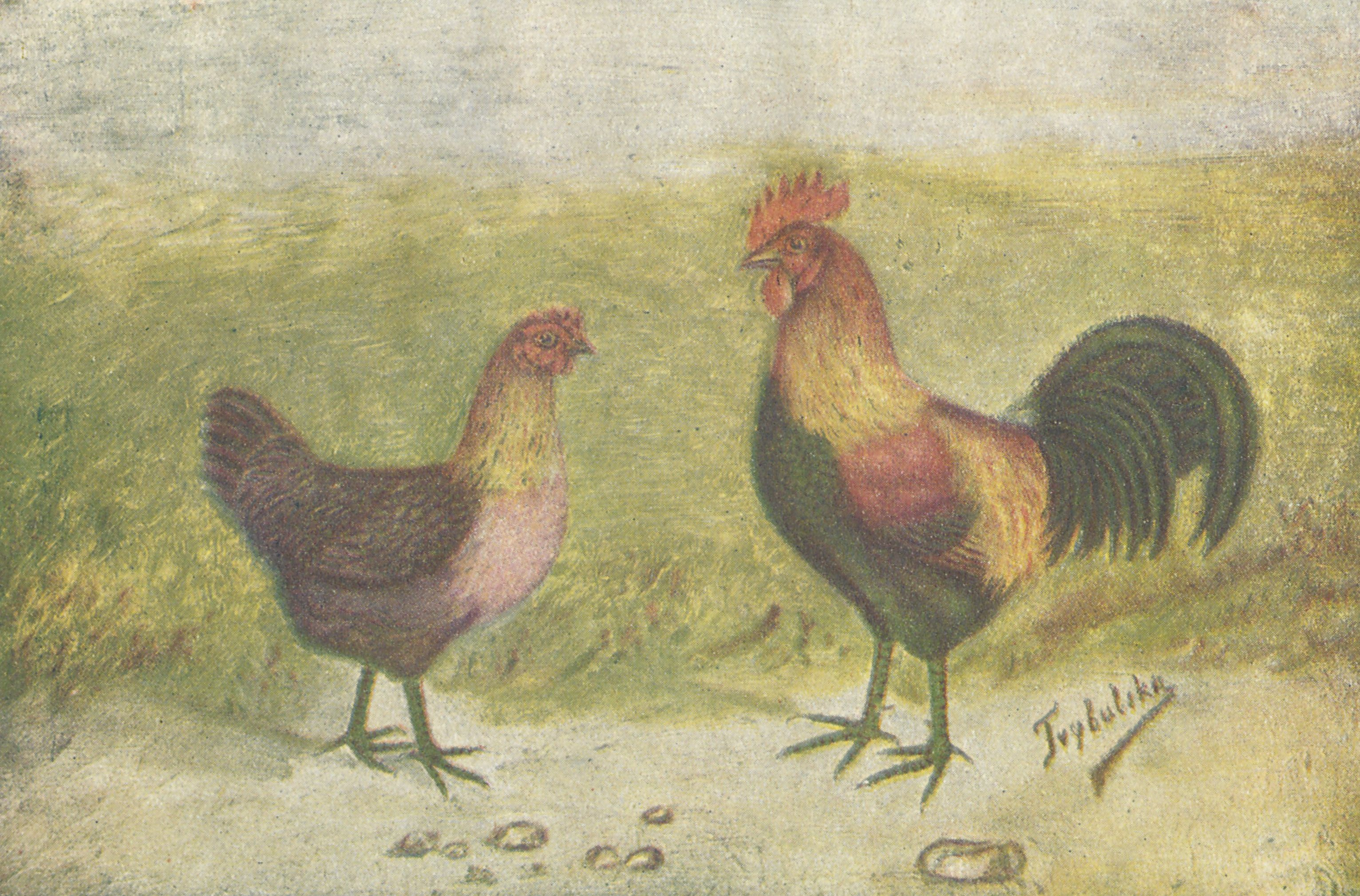
Illustration by Maurycy Trybulski from 1927

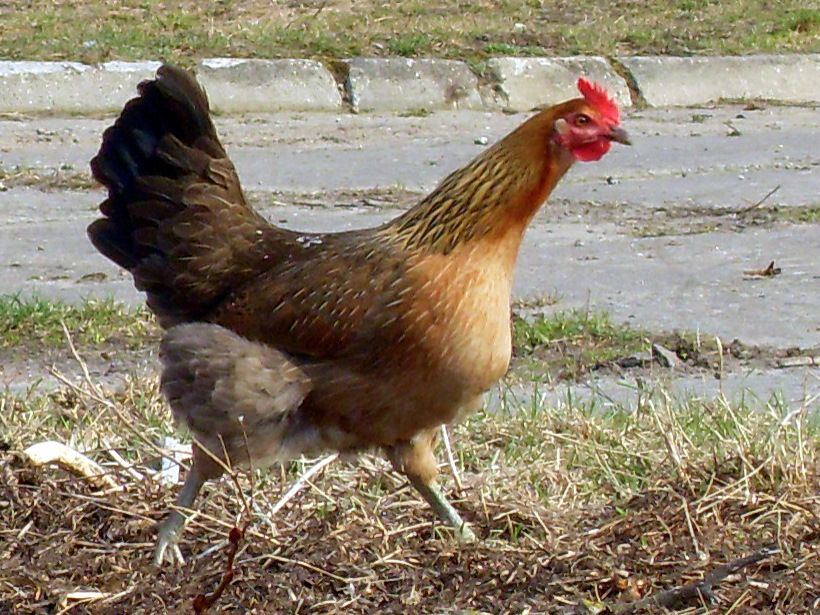
Hen

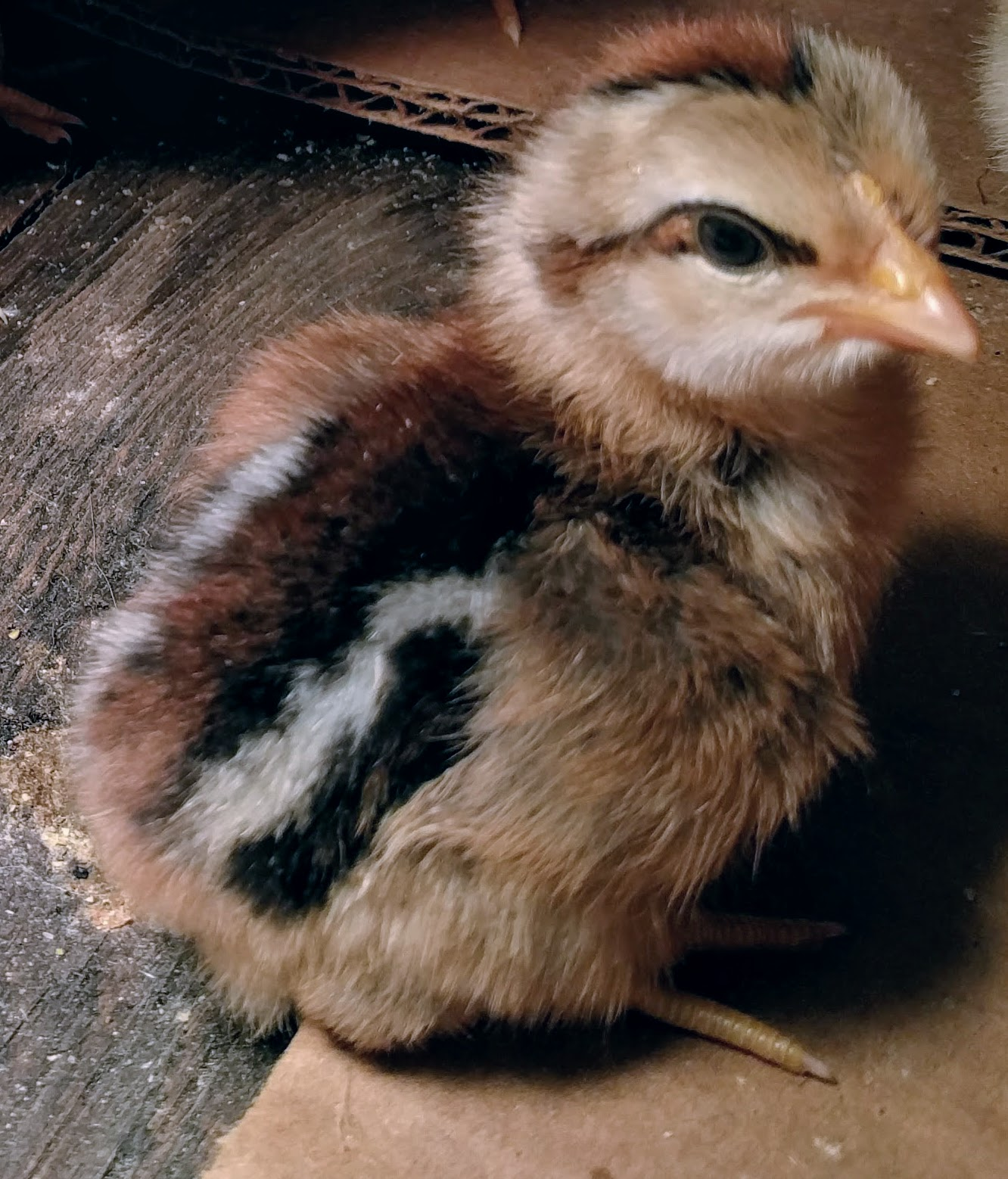
Chick
