= Maurycy Trybulski =

Maurycy Cyril Trybulski
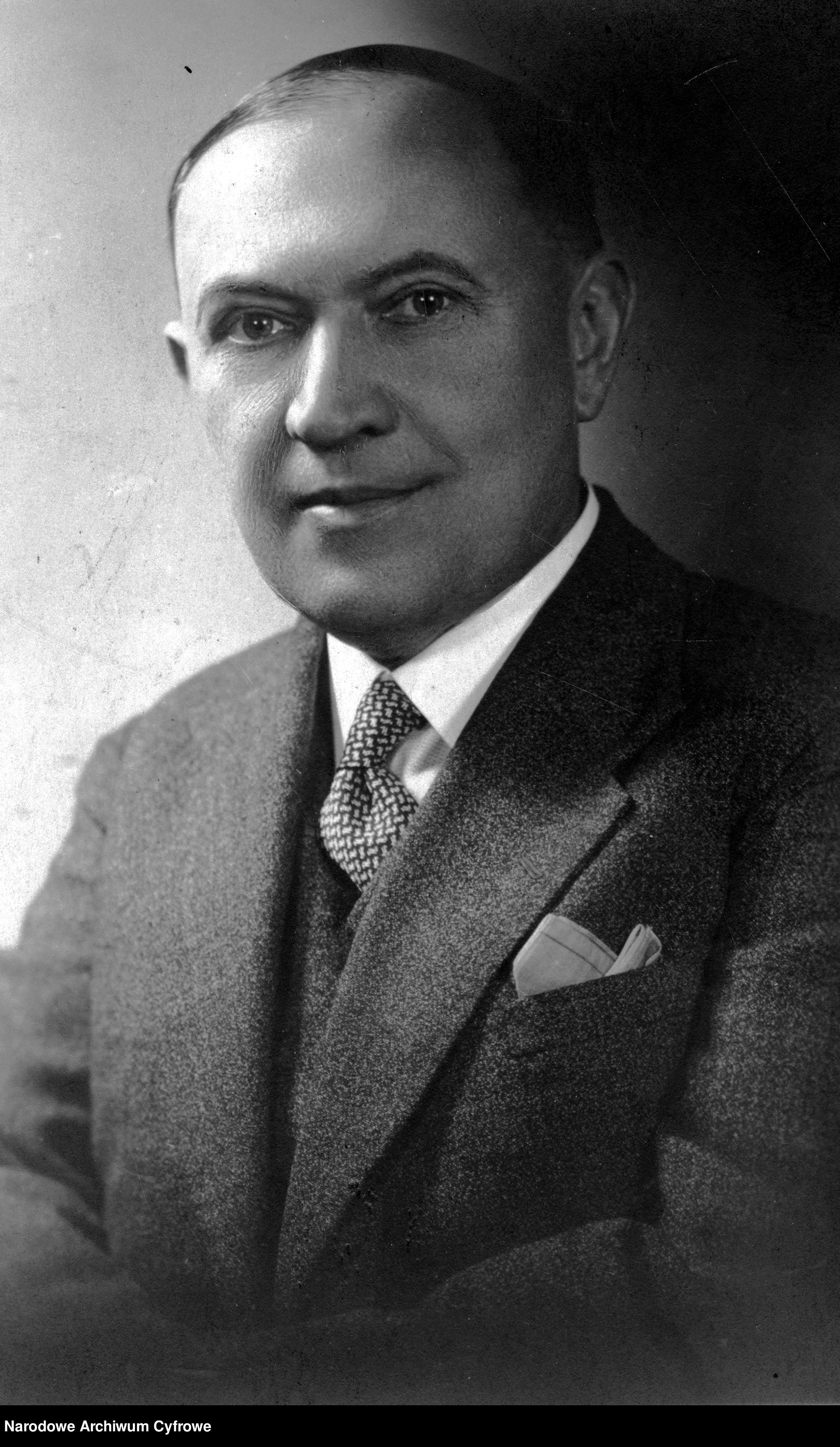
- Born: 1883; Jastrzębia
- Died: August 7, 1944; Warsaw
- Occupation(s): Academic and animal breeder

Maurycy Cyril Trybulski (1883 – August 8, 1944) was a Polish academic and animal breeder. He is remembered as the founder of the first kennel club in Poland (Polish Kennel Club), and as president of the Central Committee for Poultry Breeding in Poland (Centralny Komitet do Spraw Hodowli Drobiu w Polsce) from 1922 to the Second World War.

Trybulski was also a prolific writer and left behind numerous articles and texts, considered important for the study of animal breeding in Poland.

== Biography ==
=== Early life and education ===
Trybulski was born in 1883 in Jastrzębia, in central-eastern Poland, to Matylda Polak and Jan Trybulski. He attended the Agricultural Institute of Puławy and, from 1905, continued his studies in St. Petersburg. Upon graduation he was assigned to work in Russia as a civil servant, first in Ufa, a town beyond the Ural Mountains, then in Kaluga. For some time he also worked in Moscow, where he created a local society of cattle breeders.

=== 1920s and 1930s ===
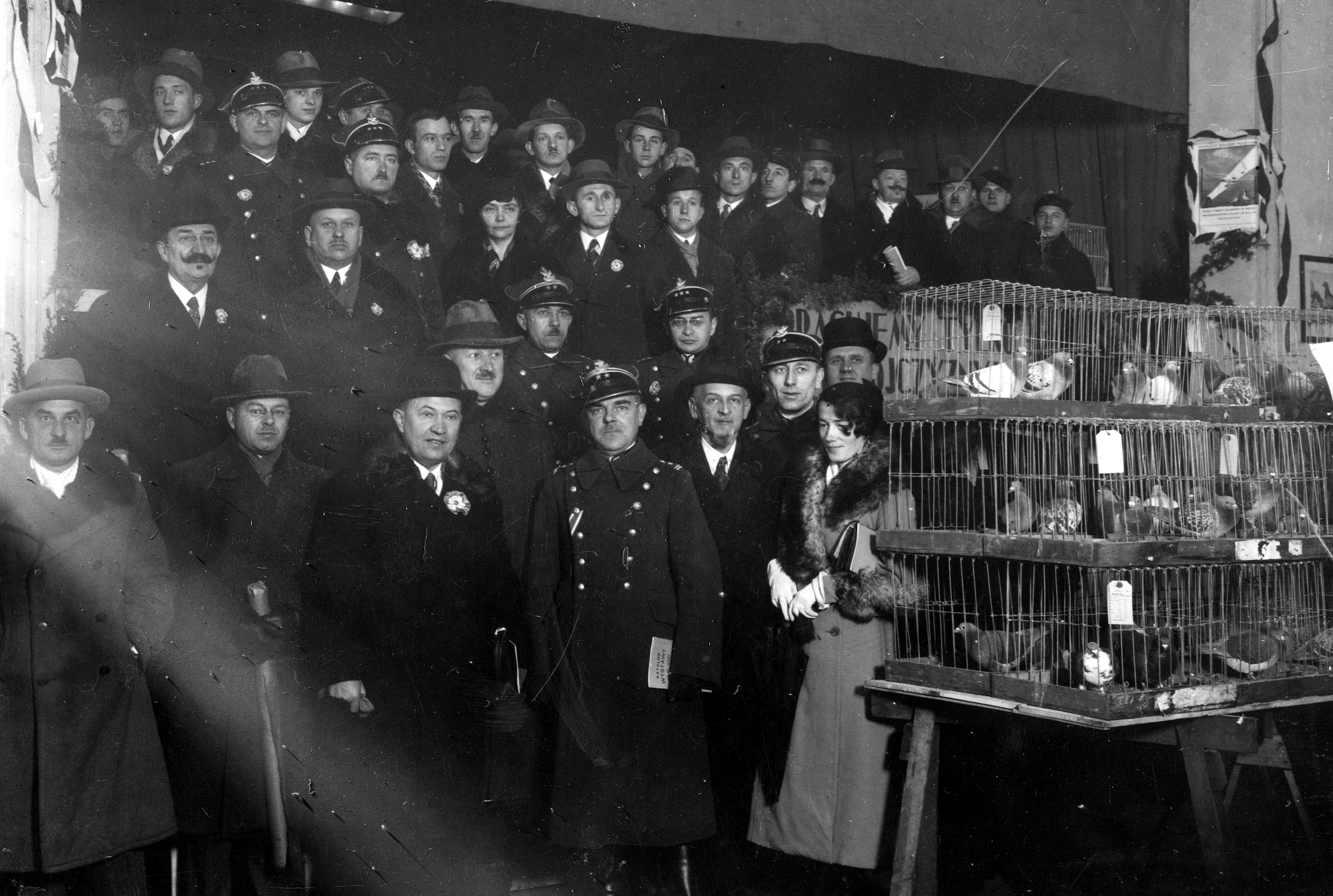
Opening of a poultry exhibition in Warsaw (1932). Maurycy Trybulski is 3rd from the left in the first row.

Following the Treaty of Riga in 1921, Trybulski was among the first Poles to return to their homeland. The same year he became president of the Central Committee for Poultry Breeding in Poland (Centralny Komitet do Spraw Hodowli Drobiu w Polsce). From 1921 he was editor in chief of the illustrated biweekly "Polski Drób" ("Polish Poultry") and, in the following years, he collaborated closely with the monthly magazines "Hodowiec Gołębi Pocztowych" ("Carrier Pigeon Breeder") and "Zagroda Wzorowa" ("Exemplary Farm"). During the 1920s and 1930s he was a lecturer at the Agricultural University of Warsaw faculty, and the Puławy Institute of Agriculture. At the same time he served as a judge in many national breeding competitions in the poultry, pigeons, dogs, cats and fur animals sections. His intense activity in the field of animal breeding, both in Poland and in Europe, earned him numerous awards including his appointment as an honorary member of the Czechoslovak Exhibition Committee in 1926, and of the Society of Pigeon Breeders of Lviv in February 1928.

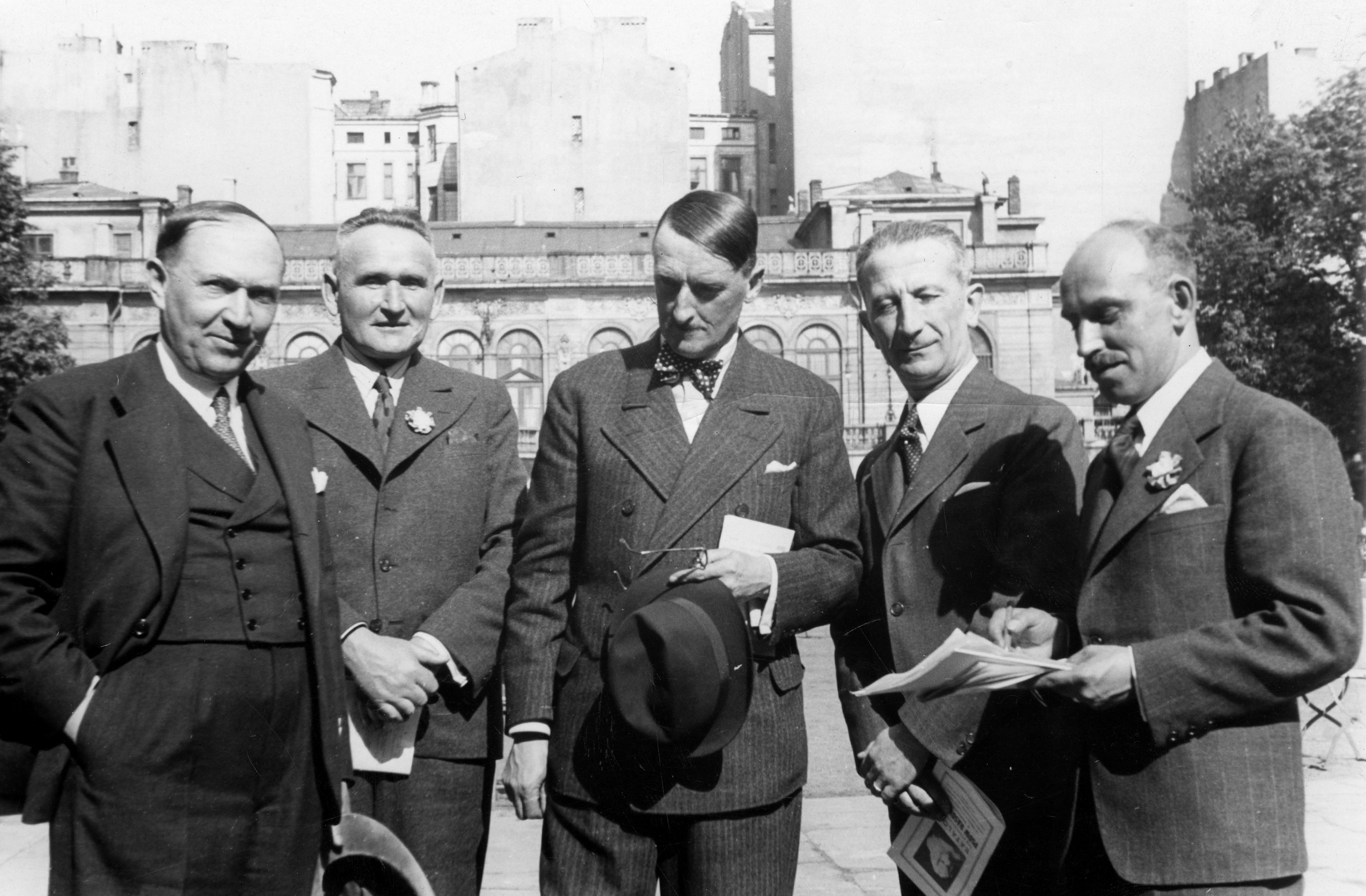
Dog Show in Warsaw. Judging panel with professor Maurycy Trybulski (first from left) 1938

In 1934 he was one of the founders and president of the first Polish kennel club (Związek Kynologiczny w Polsce). Together with other members of the club, Trybulski created the magazine Pies Rasowy i jego hodowla w Polsce (Purebred dogs and their breeding in Poland). In the same year he also supported the establishment of the Club of Breeders and Admirers of Purebred Cats (Klubu Hodowców i Miłośników Kotów Rasowych), which started the first national register of pedigree cats in Poland.

=== WWII and death ===
After the occupation of Poland, Trybulski who was fluent in German, managed to help some people escaping from the Nazi raids. During the Warsaw Uprising he opened his work office to the insurgents who, from those windows, fired a CKM wz. 30 against the position of the Nazis that in turn held the Wawel Redoubt (Reduta Wawelska) at gunpoint. In response to the uprising, starting on August 4, 1944, the Nazis began to loot and roundup the civilian population of Warsaw. On August 7, 1944, Trybulski's apartments were set on fire by the Nazis. The professor, seeing the building ablaze, rushed to save the pigeons he was breeding on the terrace of his house. There, he was hit and killed by a German sniper.

== Works ==
There are over thirty volumes written by Trybulski, and countless articles on the breeding of poultry, estimated at over 800 between 1922 and 1939. Below is a partial bibliography:

- Króliki: rasy i hodowla (Rabbits: breeds and breeding), 1922
- Kozy: rasy i hodowla (Goats: breeds and breeding), 1923
- Kury Plymouth-Rocki (Plymouth-Rock chicken), 1924
- Kury: pochodzenie, rasy, hodowla (Chickens: origin, breeds, breeding), 1925
- Kury zielononóżki polskie: pochodzenie, wzorzec, metody doboru, wychowu i użytkowania (Polish Green-legged Partridge: origin, pattern, methods of selection, rearing and use), 1927
- Psy: rasy, hodowla, tresura i leczenie (Dogs: breeds, breeding, training and treatment), 1928
- Kot domowy, jego rasy i hodowla (Domestic Cat: breeds and breeding), 1935
- Pies gospodarski (Domestic Dog), 1937
