= Polish Hound =

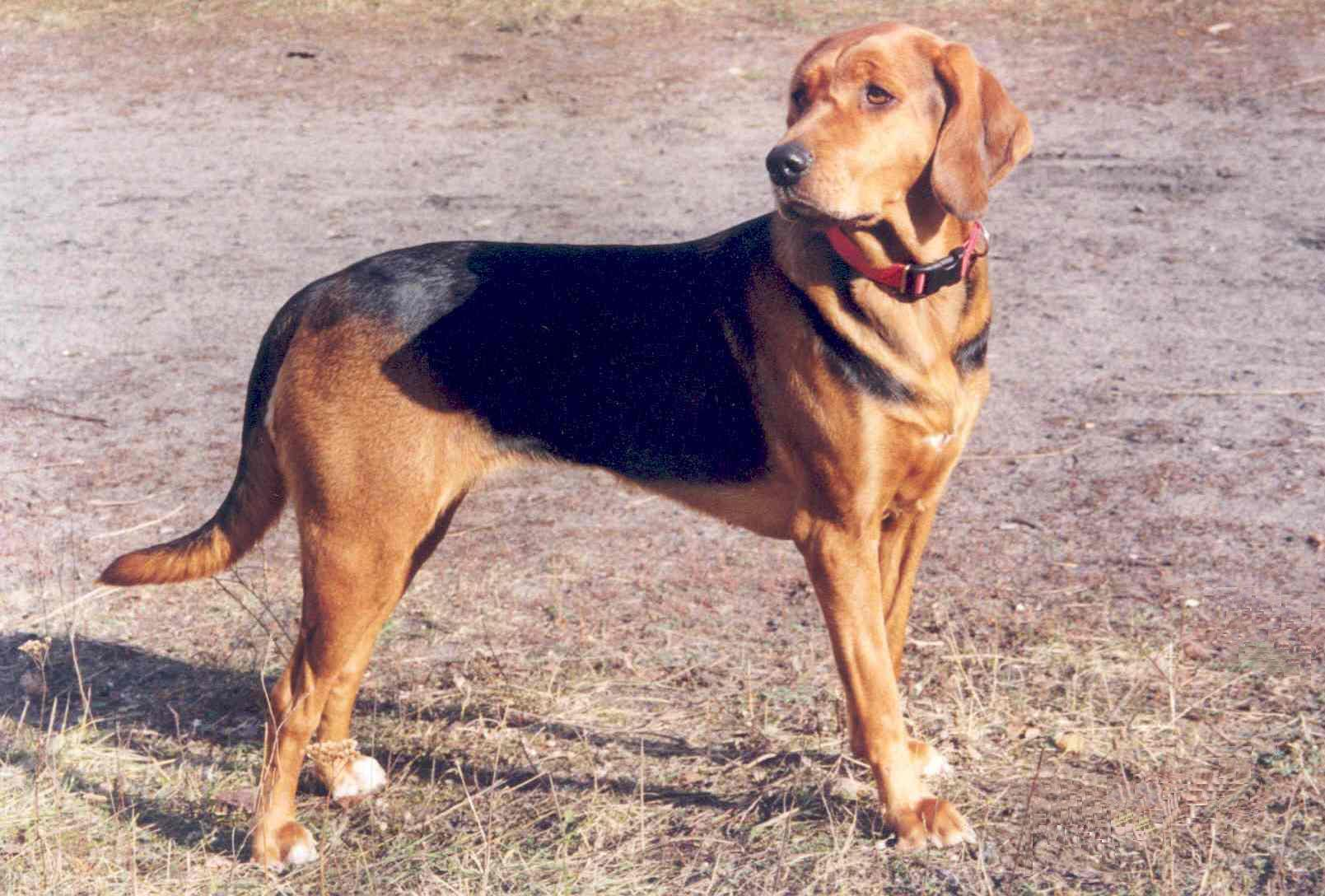
- Other names: Ogar Polski
- Origin: Poland
Kennel club standards
- Fédération Cynologique Internationale: standard

The Polish Hound (Polish: Ogar polski) is a breed of hunting dog indigenous to Poland. The Polish Hound has a keen sense of smell. This heightened sense combined with the endurance needed to hunt in harsh environments led to its use in hunting, while its stature made it popular with Polish nobility.

== History ==
The first description of the Polish (Ogar) Hound is found in the book The beginnings of the natural history and farming of the national domestic and wild animals by Krzysztof Kluk (1779). According to historians, the Polish Hounds developed through crossbreeding of Bloodhounds (the St Hubert Hound), imported to Poland in the Middle Ages, with local hounds. Jan Szytier (1819) wrote about the "Polish Hound" and the "Polish Scent Hound" in his "Hunting Guide" (Poradnik Myśliwych). World War II resulted in the decline of the Polish Hounds' population. The attempts to revive the breed led to the emergence of two types: light-boned (bred by Colonel Józef Pawłusiewicz) and heavier-boned (bred by Colonel Piotr Kartawik). The latter one was recognized by the FCI as the "Ogar Polski" in 1966.

== Description ==
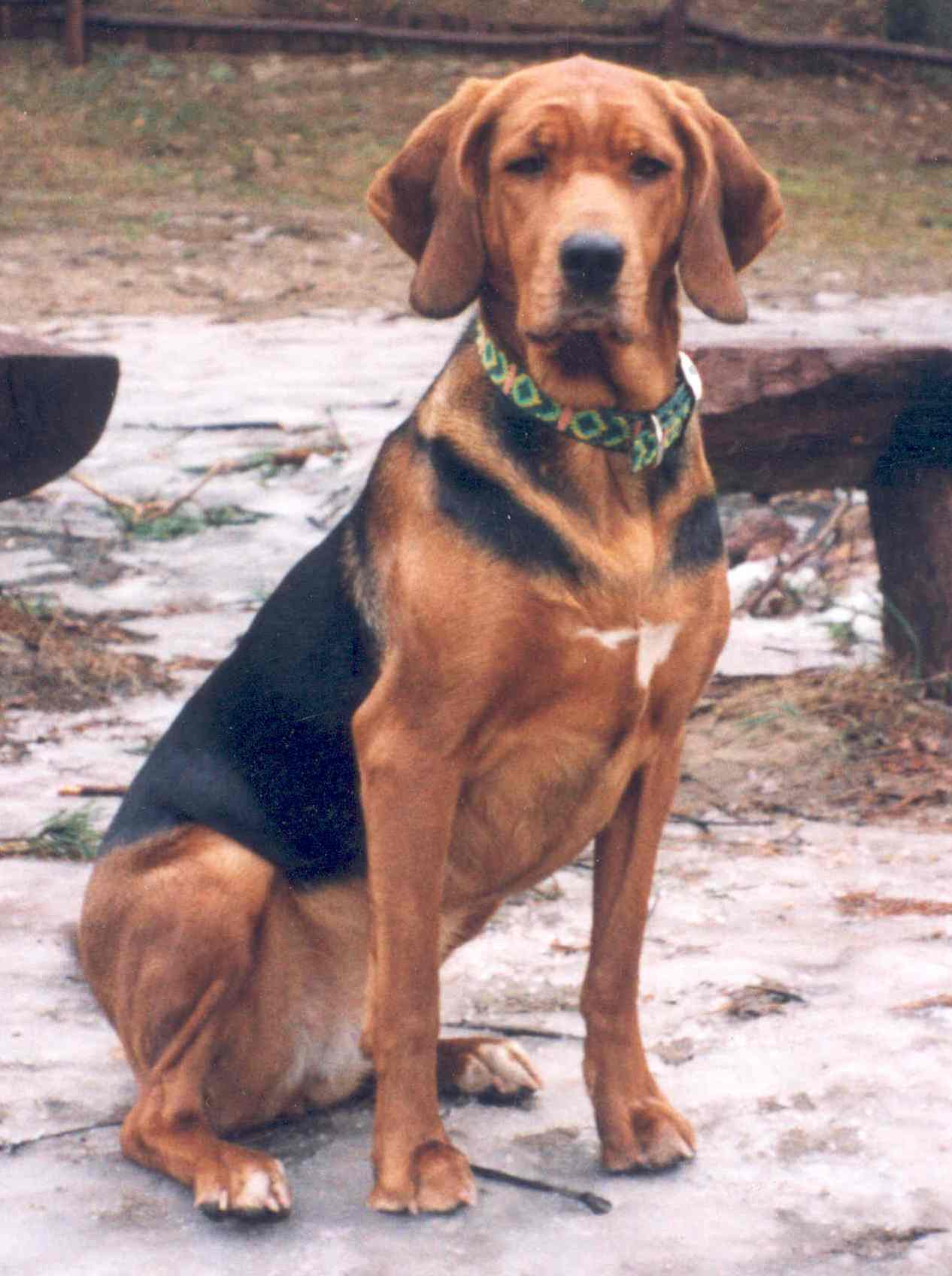

Polish Hounds reach 55–65 cm (22-23.5 inches) in height. Males weigh around 25 to 32 kg. (55-70.5 lb) while females weigh 20 to 26 kg (44-57.5 lb).

== Characteristics and Temperament ==
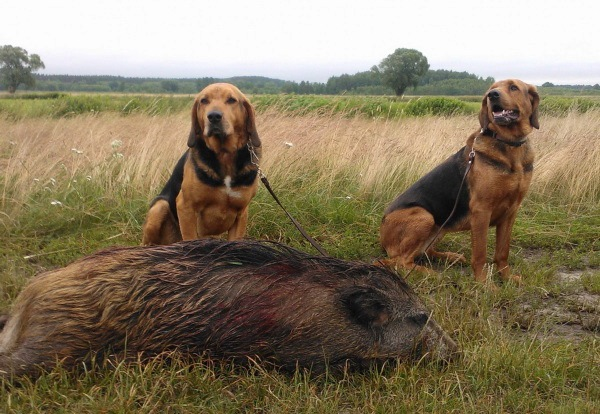
Polish hounds in Russia with a wild boar carcass.

The Polish Hound has an average life span of 13 to 14 years. A medium-sized breed, Ogar Polski is often described as strong and sleek, with a powerful bone structure. The coloration of these animals is often a combination of a brown underside and black on top running from the neck to the tail. The breed has thick double coat, which ensures water resistance on outer and underlying skin layers. The Polish Hound's voice is often described as resonant and pure which makes it an ideal hunting dog. The Polish Hound matures slowly. Intelligent and easily trained, Polish Hounds are known to be calm, affectionate animals and great pets. Friendly with other breeds and very loyal, these dogs are also very protective of their land. It is unclear as to whether this breed makes a good guard dog. Many argue that its territorial nature makes it defensive against intruders, while other state that its passive nature renders it harmless to new people. Resilient to environment due to their origin of use, the Polish Hound acclimates quickly to new settings.

== See also ==
- List of dog breeds

== See also ==
- Polish Hunting Dog
