= Polish Kennel Club =

Polish dog registration organization

- Związek Kynologiczny w Polsce
- Abbreviation: ZKwP
- Formation: 29 July 1938
- Founders: Maurycy Trybulski
- Region served: Poland
- President: Leszek Salamon (2021-now)
- Website: zkwp.pl

The Polish Kennel Club (Polish: Związek Kynologiczny w Polsce, ZKwP), a member of the FCI, is an organization responsible for dog pedigree registration services in Poland. The organization also provides training services, judging for conformation shows, and many other services relating to dog showing.
