= Gończy Polski =

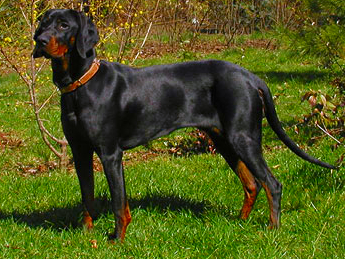
- Gończy Polski
- Other names: Polish Hunting Dog
- Origin: Poland
Traits
Height	Males	55–59 cm (22–23 in)
	Females	50–55 cm (20–22 in)
- Weight: 22–26 kg (49–57 lb)
- Coat: Short
- Colour: Black and tan, brown and tan or red.
Kennel club standards
- Fédération Cynologique Internationale: standard

The Gończy Polski, also known as the Polish Hound or the Polish Hunting Dog, is a rare breed of scent hound indigenous to Poland, prized for its stability, resilience, and minimal maintenance requirements.

== Overview ==
The Gończy Polski is a medium-sized hound, usually black and tan in colour. A smaller variety of the more common Polish Hound, it almost became extinct after the Second World War and only became known in the West after the fall of Communism. Originating from the dense forests of Poland, the Gonczy Polski, emerged as a remarkable breed renowned for its resilience, agility, and adaptable nature. Bred for the pursuit and tracking of large game, these sturdy and athletic dogs can navigate rough terrain with ease while also serving as affectionate companions. Ideal for active owners, Gonczy Polskis thrive in households with ample opportunities for exercise and adventure. While they exhibit compatibility with children and other pets when properly socialized, they may prefer single-pet households unless raised alongside others. Characterized by their responsiveness to training, Gonczy Polskis requires assertive yet confident guidance due to their innate inclination towards dominance. Despite their robust appearance, these dogs demand minimal grooming and maintenance efforts, making them suitable for various living environments, from spacious yards to apartment living. With a lifespan ranging from 10 to 13 years, Gonczy Polskis embody a blend of functionality, companionship, and resilience, making them prized additions to families and individuals seeking a devoted and low-maintenance canine companion. They are a brave and capable breed. They are not aggressive but are distrustful of strangers. They have a loud bark that is usually higher pitched in females.

== History ==
Poland has been using dogs for hunting for centuries. There have been works dating back to the 12th century that have talked about using dogs for hunting. There were two in particular. The Ogar Polski and the Gonczy Polski. They are similar breeds. The Gonczy Polski is a medium scent hound. The Gonczy Polski was mostly used in eastern Poland in the mountains and difficult terrain. They are an energetic and active dog so they were perfect for that environment.

Jozef Pawlusiewicz was a well known polish cynologist. He hunted with Gonczy Polski and was an important breeder. He was also a key figure in getting the gonczy Polski officially registered by the polish kennel club.

The Gonczy Polski was recognized by the Federation Cynologique Internationate in 2017 and is only the fifth Polish dog to have done so.

The breed was recognized by The Kennel Club on 1 April 2024.

== Genetics ==
The Gończy Polski has low genetic variation but is not at risk of an increase in homozygosity. In 2015, there were 1,342 Gończy Polski dogs registered in Poland, 432 of which are register with the Polish Kennel Club for breeding. However, if there is not an increase in population, this breed is at risk of inbreeding which can lead to genetic diseases.

== Litters ==
Litters of the Polish hound are considered to be relatively big, with litters averaging on 7.2 puppies. No less than 4 puppies have been observed in a litter, and no more than 9. The birth weight of the Polish hound multiplies by ten as they reach maturity. In a study done comparing Yorkies, Shelties, Corgis, Polish Hounds, Bouviers, Newfoundlands, and Great Danes, Polish hounds had the fastest and the most stable growth rate. (Fiszdon et al., 2009)

== See also ==
- List of dog breeds
