= University of Life Sciences in Lublin =

Agricultural school in Lublin, Poland

Coordinates: 51°14′37″N 22°32′26″E

- Uniwersytet Przyrodniczy w Lublinie
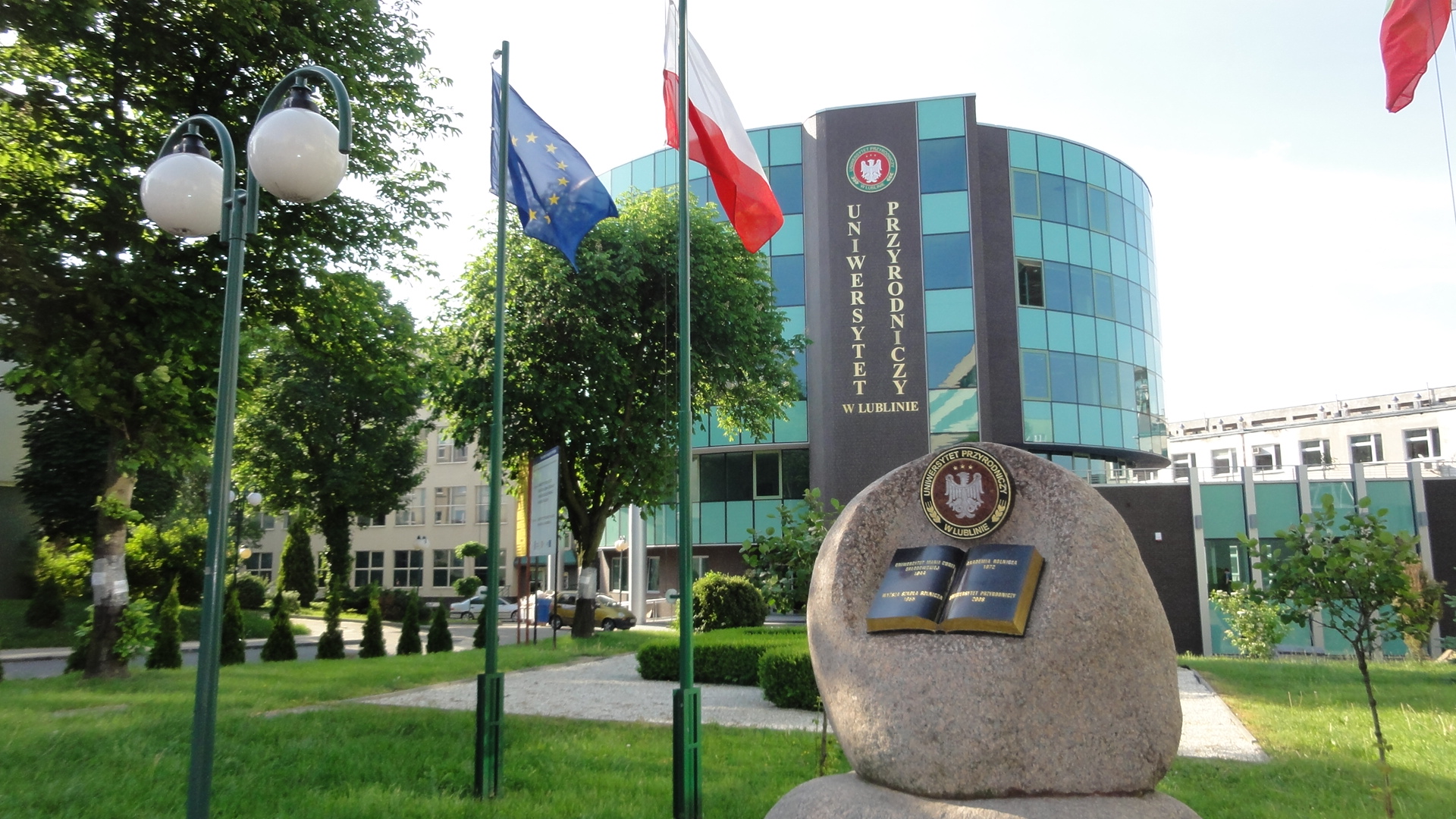
- Latin: Universitatis Rerum Naturalium Lublinensis
- Type: public
- Established: 1955
- Rector: Krzysztof Kowalczyk
- Students: 6,383 (12.2023)
- Address: Akademicka 13, 20-950 Lublin, Poland, Lublin, Poland
- Website: https://up.lublin.pl/en/
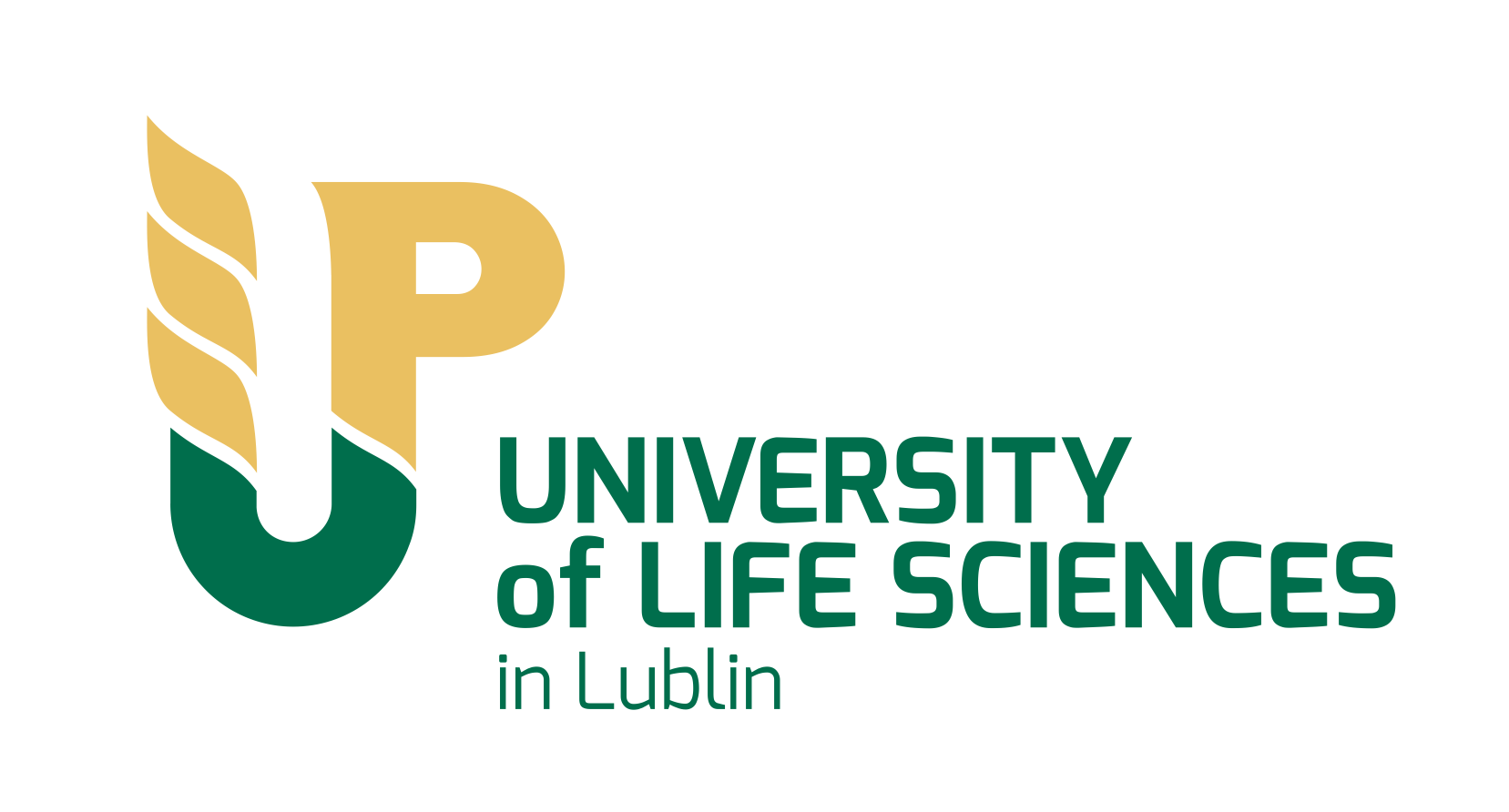

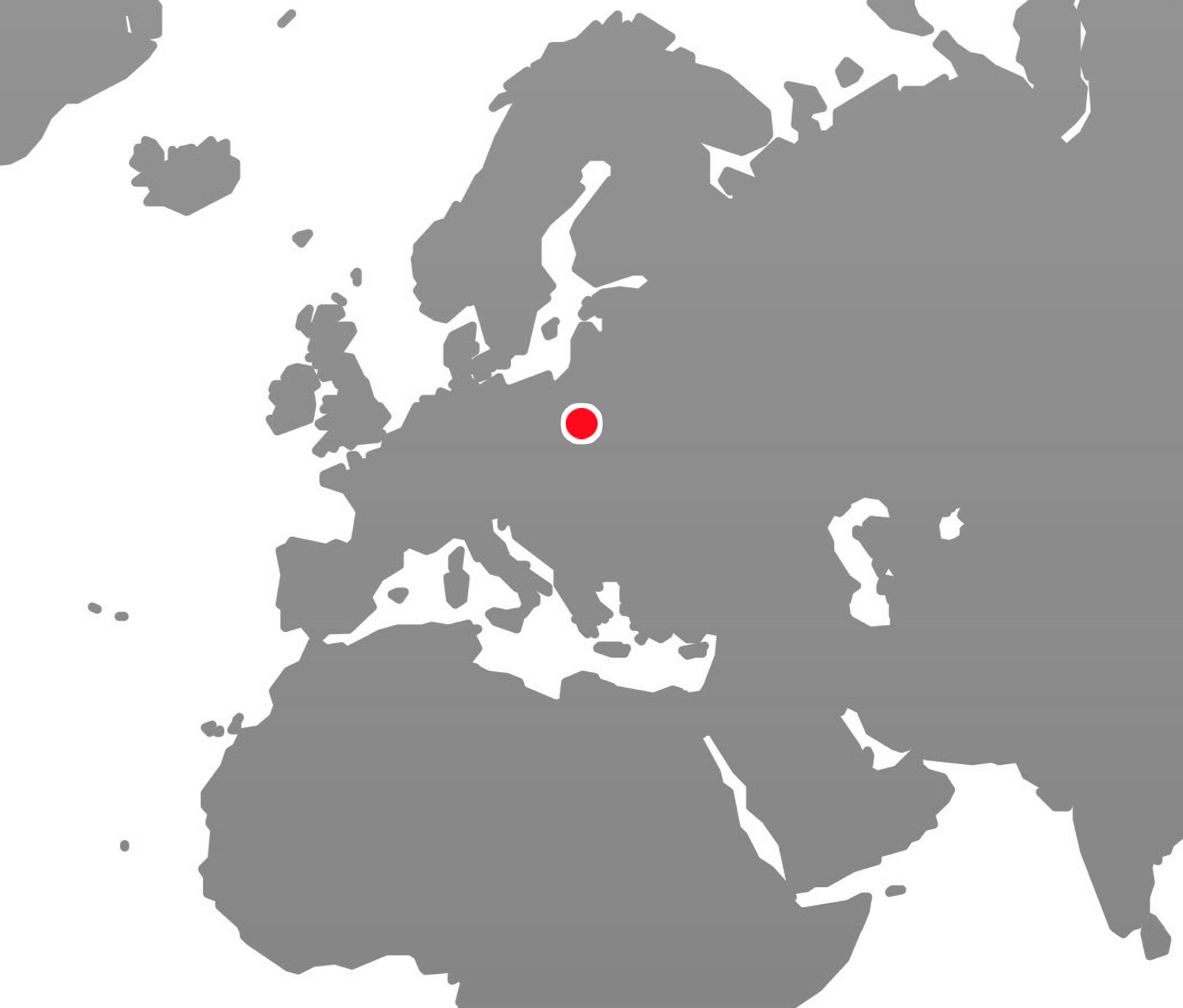
University of Life Sciences in Lublin, Poland, Europe - location

The University of Life Sciences in Lublin (Polish: Uniwersytet Przyrodniczy w Lublinie) is a multi-profile higher education institution, which integrates a wide range of agricultural, biological, veterinary, technical and socioeconomic sciences in Poland. Although the university was established in 1955, its history stems back to 1944 with the creation of the Agrarian and Veterinary Faculties within the new Maria Curie-Skłodowska University (UMCS). In 1955, these two faculties, together with the Faculty of Zootechnics (est. 1953), were spun off to create a new institution, originally called the Lublin Higher School of Agriculture. It was called the Lublin Agricultural Academy from 1972, and took its present name in 2008.

== History ==
The university traditions date back to 1944, when the first four Faculties were created at the recently established Maria Curie-Skłodowska University in Lublin: Medical, Life Sciences, Agricultural and Veterinary. Among the sequentially formed faculties, in 1953 the Department of Animal Husbandry began its operations.

In 1955, during a surge of new universities, Professor Bohdan Dobrzański, the Rector of Maria Curie-Skłodowska University at the time, was appointed to create an independent scientific – didactic and research unit from the Faculties of Agriculture, Veterinary and Zootechnics. With the Resolution No. 503 of the Council of Ministers from 6 August 1955, The Higher School of Agriculture was established in Lublin. Professor Bohdan Dobrzański became its first Rector.

The dynamic development of the university and the expansion of its activities led to the establishment of two more Departments in 1970 - Horticulture (renamed Horticulture and Landscape Architecture in 2010) and Agricultural Engineering (renamed Production Engineering in 2003). In accordance with the Council of Ministers Resolution of 23 September 1972, the university was given a new name – since then, for over 35 years, it was known as the Agricultural University in Lublin.

In 1960 the Agrarian Faculty was renamed the Agricultural Faculty and in 2007 its name was changed once again to the Agrobioengineering Faculty. Similarly, in 1995 the Veterinary Faculty was renamed the Faculty of Veterinary Medicine and in 1998, the Animal Husbandry Faculty was transformed into the Faculty of Biology and Animal Breeding. In May 2005, the Senate established the sixth faculty – the Faculty of Food Science and Biotechnology and in 2006, it established the seventh one - the Faculty of Agricultural Sciences in Zamość (former Institute of Agricultural Sciences), which operated until its closure in 2015.

On 6 March 2008, the Polish government passed a law which changed the names of some agricultural colleges. After the bill was approved by the Senate and validated by the President of Poland it was published in the Official Gazette and became effective as of 11 April 2008. During the solemn ceremony held on 17 April 2008, the name of the university was changed to the University of Life Sciences in Lublin.

Over the past few years, the university has expanded its research infrastructure. In 2012 the Main Library – the Regional Centre for Agricultural Scientific Information was opened, a year later: the Centre for Investment and Implementation of New Technologies in Agricultural Engineering, and in 2015 – the Innovative Centre for Animal Pathology and Therapy.

== Faculties ==
- Agrobioengineering
- Veterinary Medicine
- Environmental Biology
- Horticulture and Landscape Architecture
- Production Engineering
- Food Science and Biotechnology
- Animal Science and Bioeconomy

== Study in English ==
Long-cycle programme:

- Veterinary Medicine (5,5 years - 11 semesters)

Bachelor's programmes:

- Animal Science and Dairy Production
- Equine Management and Care
- Management and Production Engineering

Master's programmes:

- Agriculture
- Food Technology and Human Nutrition
- Green Urban Planning
- Management and Production Engineering
- Plant Protection and Phytosanitary Control

== Education offer ==
The educational offer includes courses and specializations in full-time and part-time studies of the first and the second- cycle as well as long- cycle Master studies. The third-cycle studies and courses taught in English are also provided. Curriculum requirements are developed within the National Qualifications Framework.

== The Historic Manor House in Felin ==
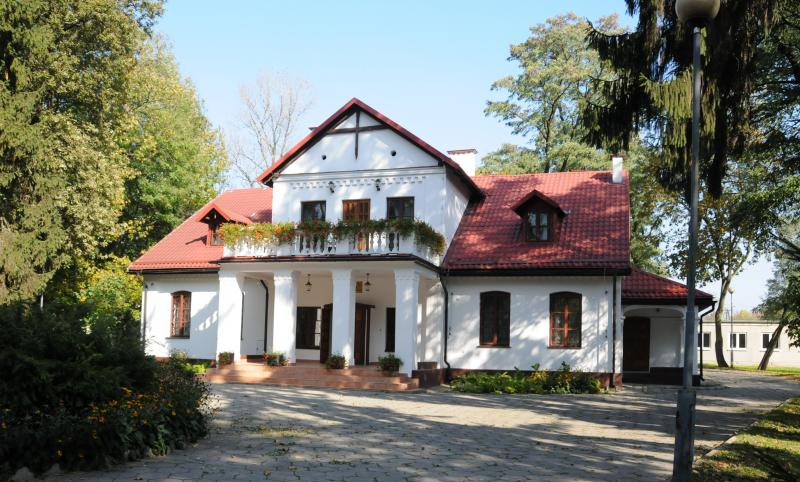
The Historic Manor House in Felin

The heritage listed manorial complex located in Felin has a representative function for University of Life Sciences in Lublin. The completion of the building dates back to the second half of 19th century and the name Felin was given to honor the Tatary heir's wife, Feliksa. In 1913 the owner of that time Erazm Plewiński, who was a well-known social activist, bequeathed the property to Agricultural Society in Lublin so that it could be converted into the School of Agriculture. The manor underwent the most significant changes during World War II when it was used as the headquarters of Colonel Klauss, one of the Nazi officials. After the war, the property was transferred to UMCS, and became the Department of Agriculture. In 1955 when the Agricultural Academy was established, the property was allotted to it to become the headquarters of the Experimental Management Department. After the major repairs, in 1990, the manor was registered as a heritage of culture of Lublin Voivodship.

The manor has a representative hall as well as a well-preserved former floor plan. The elements worth mentioning include a period fireplace in the Hall and stucco on the ceilings.
