= Hygen Hound =

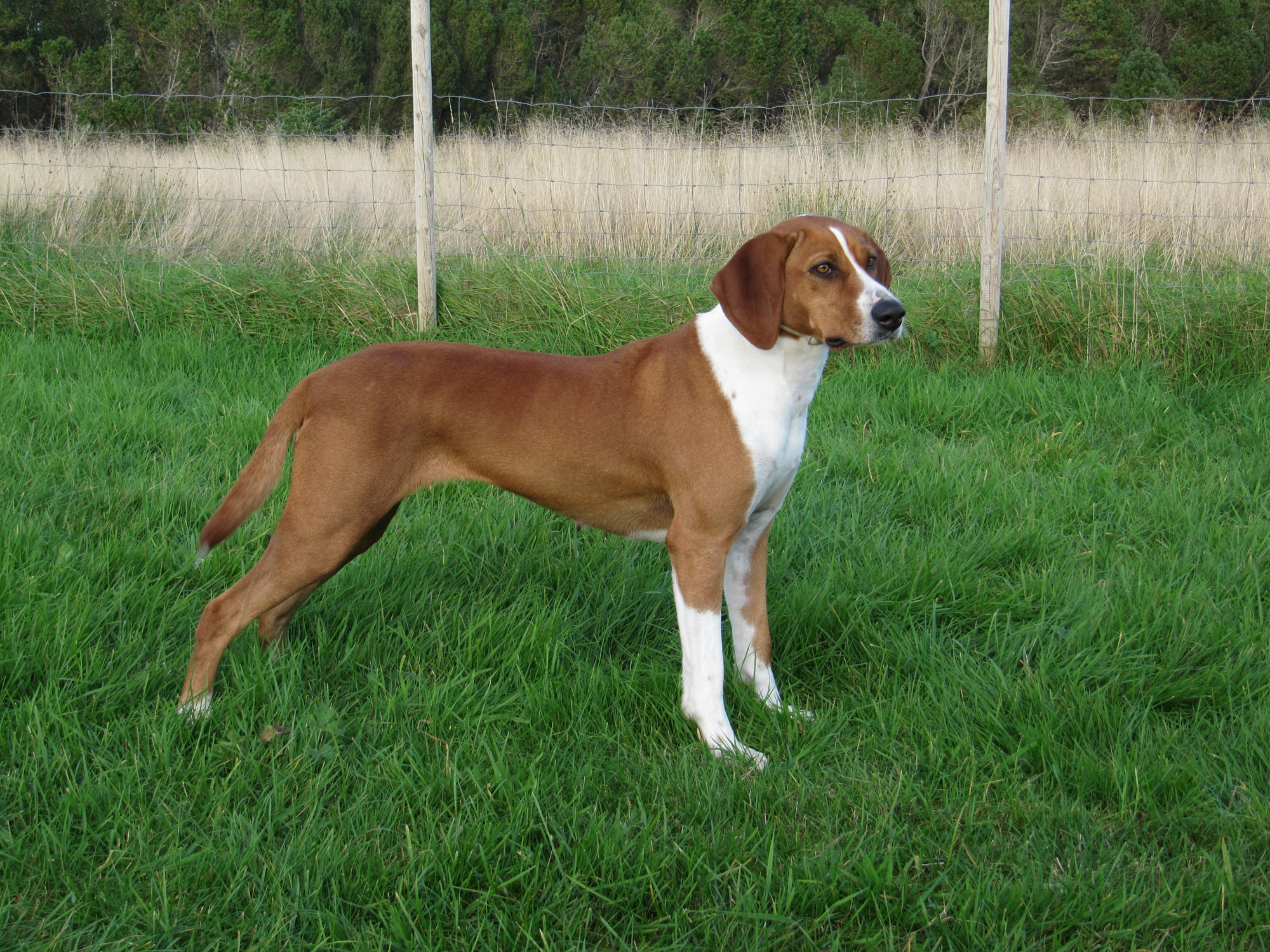
- Other names: Hygenhund
- Origin: Norway
Kennel club standards
- Fédération Cynologique Internationale: standard

A Hygen Hound (Hygenhund) is a Norwegian breed of dog from the hound group, created in the 19th century by Norwegian breeder Hygen from various other hound breeds. The Hygen Hound is an endurance hunter who can traverse Arctic terrain for long periods of time without fatigue.

== Conformation ==
The Hygen Hound stands approximately 19 to 24 inches (48 to 61 cm) high and weighs around 44 to 55 pounds (20 to 25 kg). They have a thick, shiny coat with straight hairs. They can be found in yellow and red, chestnut (with or without black shading) and black with bright chestnut colors, sometimes combined with white markings.

Their heads are triangular, with a broad skull and dark eyes. The ears are wide, the muzzle medium-sized and the neck long and clean. They have level toplines and a solid, compact body. The legs are solid and muscular and the feet compact, and they move in a well-balanced, reaching motion. The tail is carried high, but not curled over the back. Their temperaments are energetic and free-spirited.

== See also ==
- List of dog breeds
