= Lure coursing =

Dog sport

Lure coursing is a sport for dogs that involves chasing a mechanically operated lure. Competition is typically limited to dogs of purebred sighthound breeds. The AKC has a pass/fail trial for all breeds called the Coursing Ability Test (CAT) and a timed 100 yard dash called Fast CAT where the dog's speed is converted to points.

== Lure course ==
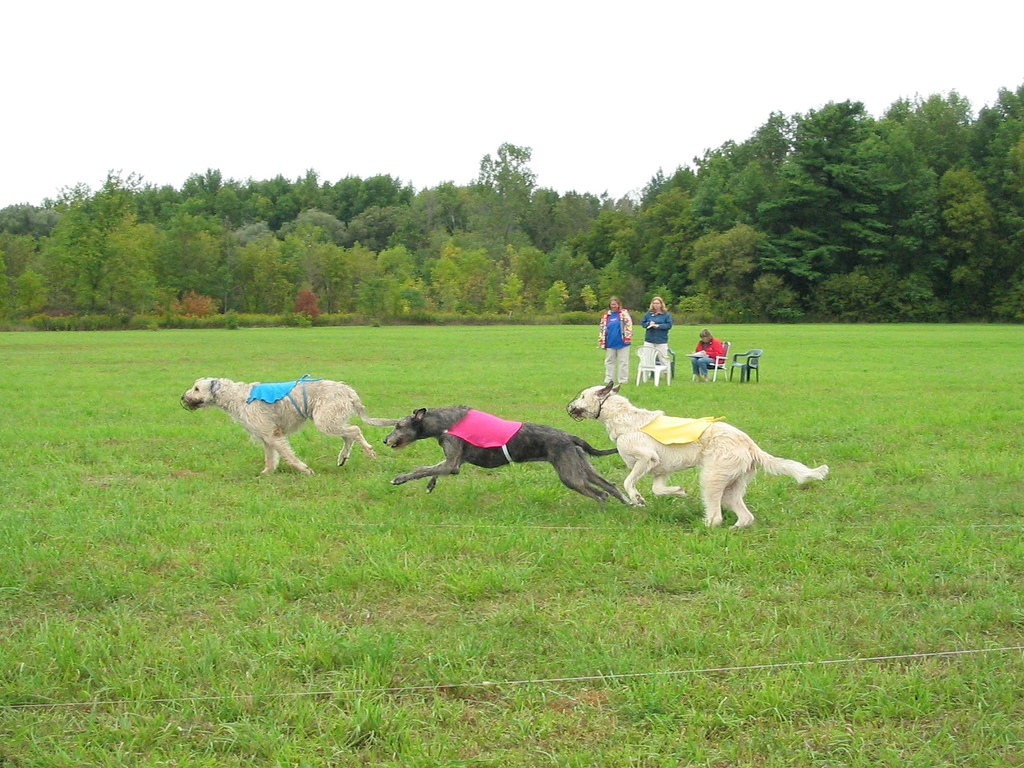
Irish Wolfhounds Coursing in North America at an IWCC Lure Trial.

In lure coursing, dogs chase an artificial lure across a field, following a pattern that is meant to simulate live coursing. A typical lure course in the United States is between 600 and 1,000 yards (550 and 910 m) long. In Europe, as well as the rest of the world, the course length can be over 1000 meters, and often incorporates some obstacles or jumps. The course must have a minimum number of turns in order to simulate prey (the jack-rabbit or hare) changing direction in a chase. The fields can be fenced or not. If a dog is lure focused they will typically follow the lure from start to finish and not run off course. Dogs with some considerable lure experience, termed "lure-wise", may try to anticipate or "cheat" by attempting to cut off the lure instead of trying to capture the lure using follow, speed and agility. Sighthounds generally have no need to be trained or enticed to chase the lure since the desire to chase is instinctual.

Some breeds do, however, require lure play at a very early age to encourage them to follow an artificial object with enthusiasm. Dogs must be at least one year old to compete; the hard fast turns are tough on a dog's developing joints, and intense and frequent competitive lure coursing before the age of 12 months may cause joint problems later in life. Dogs at an earlier age do require a moderate but essential introduction to the artificial chase to: stimulate their normal mental and physical development, to prepare and improve their capacity to perform physically with enthusiasm without hurting themselves – as is the case with the mutual, voluntary athletic play of littermates.

== Qualifying to compete ==
In American Sighthound Field Association (ASFA) competitions, a dog must be Certified in order to compete in the Open category of the breed. To certify, a dog must run clean (not interfere with the other hound and pursue the lure) with another dog of similar running style and be certified by a qualified ASFA judge. Dogs used for certification do not have to be certified themselves, nor do they have to be a sighthound, and judges can certify two or three hounds at the same time. Hounds do not have to be certified, or have the QC to run in the Singles stake. In American Kennel Club (AKC) coursing, a rule was passed in early 2010, making the certification process similar to the ASFA certification process. A dog must run cleanly against another dog of similar running style in order to earn a QC (Qualified Courser, not a title, but the hound is now qualified to compete in Open competition). Both the ASFA certification and the AKC QC are accepted as qualifiers to run in Open for each organization. In AKC dogs can still earn their JC (junior courser) title by running a minimum of 600 yards (550 m) with four turns twice, in two separate trials, under two different qualified AKC judges. The dogs run alone, and once they complete both runs, they earn a Junior Courser (JC) title. The JC title, however, no longer allows them to compete against other dogs.

In Europe, competing dogs need a coursing licence or racing licence for official national and international lure coursing trials, obtained through a racing or coursing club, and are principally run in braces only of the same breed, or run solo.

== Levels of competition ==
Dogs are coursed by breed in trios (three) in North America, or braces (two) in Europe. Hounds must run jacketed in yellow, pink and blue in North America, red and white in Europe. Dogs can run alone if there are no other dogs of the same breed or stake entered, but in AKC their scores will not receive enough points to qualify towards a title unless they defeat a hound in a Best Of Breed run which has an AKC annually designated number for each breed to earn a "major" or win Best In Field. Running order is determined by a random draw within their breed and stake. Dogs in North America can compete in open stake, field champion stake (for dogs who have earned the requisite number of points), or veteran stake (dogs over the age of 6 years, except Irish Wolfhounds (5 years), and Whippets (7 years)).

There is also a Singles stake where hounds run alone and need not be certified. ASFA has also set up a Lure Coursing Instinct stake which can be run in a regular trial, for any non-sighthound dogs. It is run like the Singles stake, with dogs running the course alone. Each dog runs twice during the trial. The first run is the "preliminary". After all preliminaries have been run, the course is reversed for the second run, called "finals". A hound does not qualify for any points or title in ASFA unless they get at least 50 points including both runs. Once all preliminaries and finals have been run, Best of Breed is determined for each breed by stakes run-off or by forfeit. All placements must be determined by total score (preliminary + final), run-off, or forfeit. After the Best of Breed runs, the top dogs from each breed compete for Best In Field to determine the best hound for the trial. Some clubs opt to provide a Best in Event which brings Best of Breed dogs from multiple days to run off. In AKC, rules regarding breeds that may not compete in Best In Field are updated periodically, based on recommendations of the breed club, and provisional or limited breeds also may not run in Best In Field.

== Judging ==
=== ASFA ===
In American Sighthound Field Association trials, hounds receive a numerical score based on speed (25), agility (25), endurance (20), enthusiasm (15), and follow (15) for a maximum score of 100 points. "Follow" means in pursuit of the lure, not the other dogs. Judges will deduct a pre-slip penalty of up to 10 points for the early release of a hound in a course. Judges can also assess up to 10 points penalty for a course delay. Judges can excuse a hound from competition for failing to run, being unfit, coursing another hound instead of the lure, hound or handler interference, or excessive course delay. Hounds can be dismissed for interfering with another hound. Hounds may be disqualified for being the aggressor in a fight on the field.

=== AKC ===
In American Kennel Club trials, hounds are judged for overall ability (10), follow (10), speed (10), agility (10), and endurance (10) for a maximum score of 50 points.

The AKC also offers lure coursing titles for all breeds through the Coursing Ability Test (CAT). This program is pass or fail. To pass, the dog must complete a 300-yard (270 m) or 600-yard (550 m) course (determined by breed) with enthusiasm.

=== FCI ===
In international lure coursing trials in Europe, dogs are judged according to the FCI Regulations for international lure coursing competitions. Lure coursing judges judge the performance of the dogs on the basis of the following five criteria: Speed; Enthusiasm; Intelligence; Agility; Endurance. The maximum number of points to be given for each criterion is 20.

Some European countries (for example, France and Germany) have their own judging systems. Using these systems in international trials is also allowed, as long as the qualifying criteria are within the general FCI framework of rules.

== Titles ==
=== ASFA ===
Once an Open hound receives 100 title points plus either two first placements or one first and two second placements, they earn a Field Champion title (FCh). A hound earns a Lure Courser of Merit title (LCM) each time it earns 300 points and four first placements.

Titles can also be earned in Singles stake.

=== AKC ===
Once a dog has received 15 AKC lure coursing points, which must include two majors (3 to 5 point at one trial), it will have earned a Field Champion (FC) prefix title. Any dog that has earned the title of Field Champion and has earned 45 additional championship points from the Special or Veterans Stake, shall be awarded the suffix title of Lure Courser Excellent (LCX). The title of Lure Courser Excellent is a cumulative title. Each time a hound accrues an additional 45 championship points, it would be eligible to receive the next title level (LCX II, LCX III, LCX IV, etc.). Once a dog has achieved four qualifying runs (50 point runs) they earn a Senior Courser (SC) suffix title. Twenty five additional qualifying runs after the SC title is earned will results in a Master Courser (MC) suffix title.

=== FCI ===
At international lure coursing trials, the CACIL (Certificat d'Aptitude au Championnat International des Courses de Lévriers) is given to the first placed sighthound of each breed and sex, provided that it has achieved at least two thirds of the possible total points. If there are less than six dogs per sex entered, only one CACIL is provided; if there are less than six starters per breed, the CACIL is not given. Sighthounds which did not get at least 50% of the points in the first round, will not be allowed to take part in the second round. The title of an "International Lure Coursing Champion" is given to dogs with complete pedigree, which have gained at least two CACIL within more than 12 months in two different countries, and which have earned at least the qualification "Very Good" at two International FCI dog shows.

Since 2002, the FCI holds an annual European Lure Coursing Championship trial. In 2012, the championships were held in Dunakeszi, Hungary, in 2013 in Pouch, Germany, and in 2014 in Luserna (Italy). The FCI European Lure Coursing Championships took place on 6 and 7 June 2015 in Helsinki, Finland.

Many European countries also have their own National Lure Coursing Championships, as well as National Lure Coursing Cup competitions.

== Sanctioning organizations ==
In the United States, the ASFA and AKC are the two main sanctioning bodies. Hound breeds eligible for competition include:

- Afghan Hound
- Azawakh
- Basenji
- Borzoi
- Cirneco dell'Etna
- Deerhound
- Greyhound
- Ibizan Hound
- Irish Wolfhound
- Italian Greyhound
- Norrbottenspets (AKC only)
- Peruvian Inca Orchid
- Pharaoh Hound
- Portuguese Podengo (Medio and Grande)
- Portuguese Podengo Pequeno
- Rhodesian Ridgeback
- Saluki
- Sloughi
- Thai Ridgeback (AKC only)
- Whippet
- Silken Windhound(ASFA Only)

Breeds that are allowed to compete in ASFA's Limited Stakes are:

- Chart Polski
- Galgo Espanol
- Magyar Agar
- Peruvian Inca Orchid
- Portuguese Podengo (3 varieties that are to be run separately)

Only AKC-recognized breeds can compete in AKC lure coursing trials, but all AKC breeds, as well as dogs registered with the AKC's Canine Partners, may participate in the AKC's Coursing Ability Test.

For ASFA, hounds must be registered with an ASFA approved registry, such as the American Kennel Club, National Greyhound Association, the Federation Cynologique Internationale, an ASFA-recognized foreign registry or, in the case of Salukis, a critique registration number from the Society for the Perpetuation of Desert Bred Salukis.

In Canada, lure coursing is sanctioned by the Canadian Kennel Club (CKC). In Canada, the officially eligible breeds do not include the Sloughi, or the Rhodesian Ridgeback. An effort is currently underway to get the Rhodesian Ridgeback included in Canadian lure coursing. The Italian Greyhound, although considered a Toy Breed in AKC is now eligible for Lure Coursing as the CKC recognizes it as a Sighthound.

In Europe, international lure coursing trials are held under the auspices of the Commission for Sighthound Sport of the F.C.I. Trials are organised by local lure coursing clubs, which are either directly affiliated with the national member organisation of the FCI or with a national sighthound club, which again is affiliated with the national FCI member club.

Eligible breeds include all breeds of FCI group 10 (Sighthounds):

- Afghan Hound
- Azawakh
- Borzoi
- Chart Polski
- Deerhound
- Galgo Espanol
- Greyhound
- Irish Wolfhound
- Italian Greyhound
- Magyar Agar
- Saluki
- Sloughi
- Whippet

The following breeds of FCI group 5 (primitive type) are also allowed to participate; they can gain most national titles and can also take part in the European Lure Coursing Championship trial. However, they can currently not get the CACIL:

- Cirneco dell'Etna
- Pharaoh Hound
- Podenco Canario
- Podenco Ibicenco (Ibizan Hound)

Basenji, Podengo Português, Rhodesian Ridgeback, and Hortaya Borzaya may participate on national level in some European countries, but they are currently not eligible for FCI international lure coursing trials.

== See also ==
- Dog sports
- Championship (dog)

== Bibliography ==
- Lure Coursing Arthur S. Beaman
- Hounds Hares & Other Creatures, The Complete Book of Coursing by Steve Copold
- Sighthounds Afield by Denise Como
- M. H. Salmon ("Dutch"). Gazehounds & Coursing: The History, Art, and Sport of Hunting with Sighthounds, Rev. and expanded 2nd ed. Silver City, N.M.: High-Lonesome Books, 1999. ISBN 0-944383-49-1.
- Canines & Coyotes by Leon V. Almirall
- Field Advisory News (F.A.N.), official publication for ASFA
