= Silken Windhound =

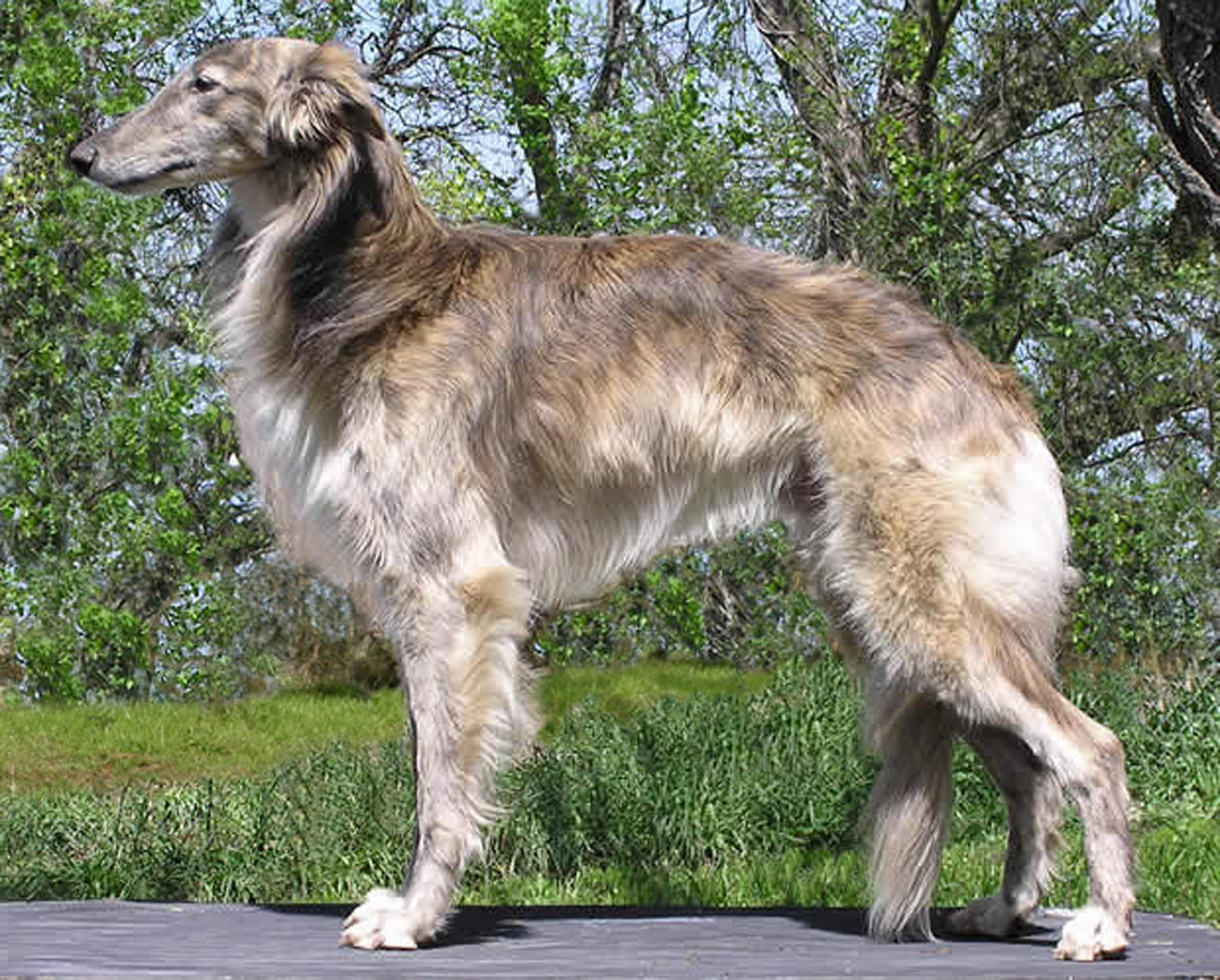
- Other names: Windhound
- Common nicknames: Silken
- Origin: United States
Traits
- Height: 47–60 cm (18.5–23.5 in)
- Coat: Silky and wavy, with feathering
- Color: Any colour
Kennel club standards
- United Kennel Club: standard
- Dutch Kennel Club: standard

The Silken Windhound is an American breed of sighthound. Like most sighthounds, Silkens are noted coursers.

== Traits ==
=== Appearance ===
Silken Windhounds are graceful, small to medium sized sighthounds with silky coats of middling length. A Silken coat colors can range from white to black, with brilliant brindles or a solid red. They can be spotted, tuxedo-marked or solid-colored, as the standard includes all colors and markings.

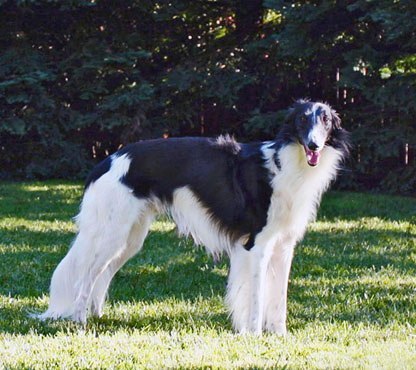
A black Silken with piebald markings

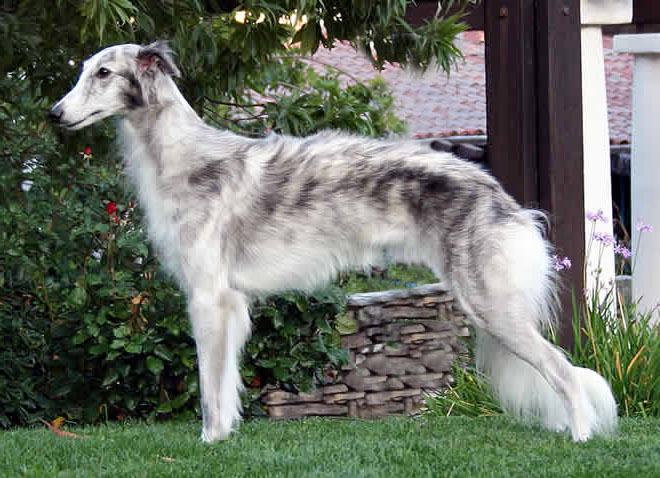
A grey Silken Windhound

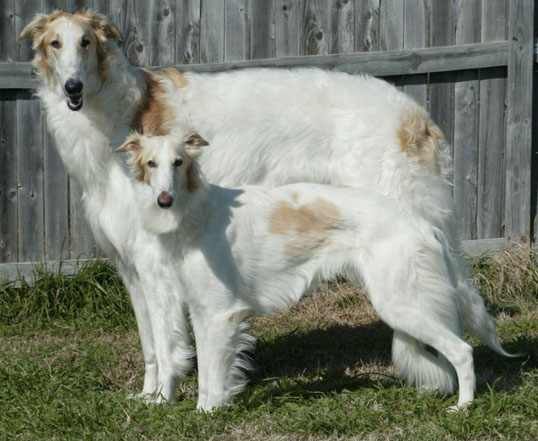
A Silken and a larger Borzoi

=== Temperament ===
Silken Windhounds are affectionate and playful, and are good dogs for families with children. Due to their friendliness, they are not good guard dogs but are easily housebroken and can be trained to live with smaller household pets. Silkens have strong prey drive in the field and particularly like agility, therapy, flyball, and obedience.

== Training ==
Silken Windhounds are intelligent and easily trained using rewards and affection in short, positive sessions. They will work eagerly and form strong relationships with their owners if treated well. Like many sighthounds, Silken Windhounds can slip out of buckle collars, so most owners favor semi-slip collars.

== Health ==
Silken Windhounds typically live into their middle to late teens. Bone and joint ailments like hip dysplasia and bloat are rare. Some individual Silken Windhounds are sensitive to ivermectin and related drugs; a simple test is now available to find whether a dog carries a defective MDR1, a multi-drug resistance gene. Some owners report cases of cryptorchidism, umbilical hernia, and lotus syndrome, plus deafness and cataracts in old age.

== History ==
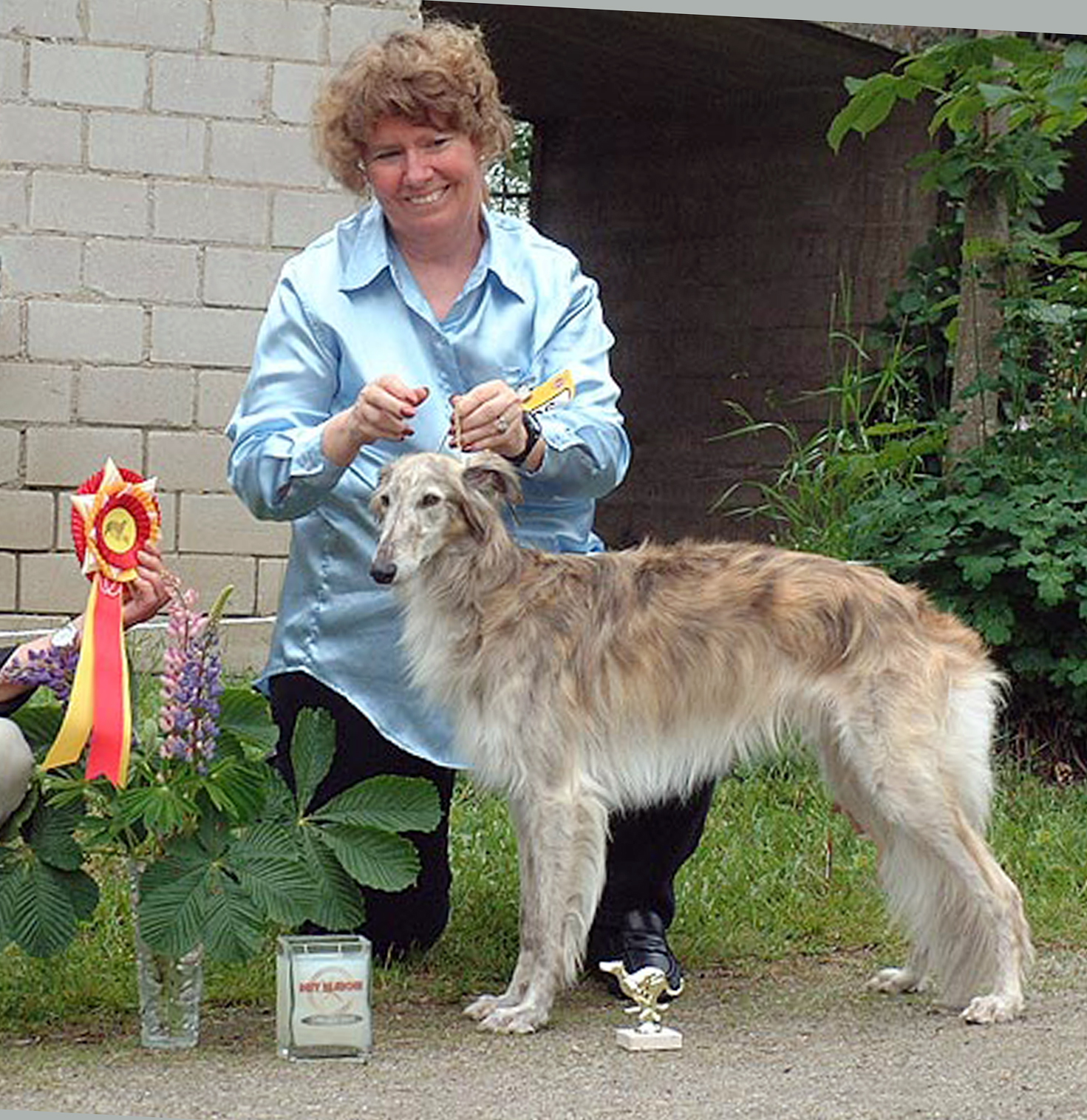
Francie Stull showing a Silken

Silken Windhounds were founded and developed in Austin, Texas, by Francie Stull, a successful breeder of show and performance American Kennel Club Borzoi and Deerhounds, using her favored Borzoi and Lurcher bloodlines. The first Silken Windhound litter was whelped in 1985 and a breed club, the International Silken Windhound Society, was formed in 1999.

The Silken Windhound studbooks closed in 2000, with minimal sanctioned outcrossing to foundational breeds being monitored to improve health and lower COI.

In late 2009, Silken Windhounds were accepted as a Limited Stakes breed in the ASFA. Over forty dogs competed in ASFA limited stakes in their first month of acceptance.

In late 2010, Silken Windhounds were accepted as a breed in NOFCA, the National Open Field Coursing Association, and can participate in open field events. On March 18, 2011, Silken Windhounds were recognized by the United Kennel Club. The breed has since also been recognized by Fédération Cynologique Internationale-affiliated kennel clubs in Germany and the Netherlands, though it remains unrecognized by the FCI itself.

In 2026, the Silken Windhound was added to The American Kennel Club Foundation Stock Service (FSS).

== Events ==
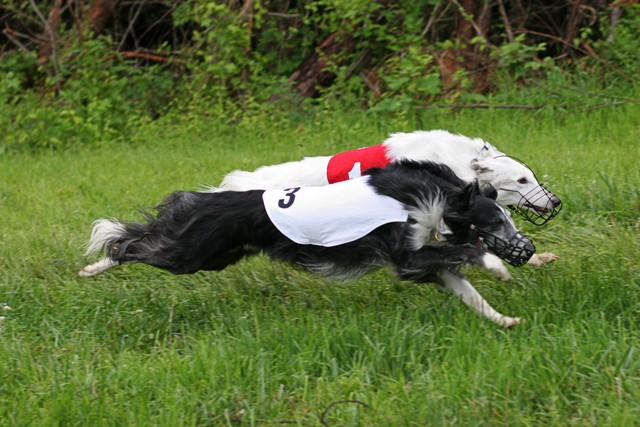
A straight race of Silkens

Silken Windhounds participate in performance sports and showings worldwide, including the NAKC, IABCA, and NCA, as part of the hound group. In Slovenia, Silkens are an accepted part of the Slovenian Kennel Club, member of the FCI, also in the hound group. Silken Windhounds also participate in sighthound performance sports, competing alongside other sighthounds in Finnish lure coursing and straight racing events. The ISWS has established straight and oval track racing programs that enable Silkens to compete and win points towards performance titles.

== See also ==
- List of dog breeds
- Whippet – A similarly sized sighthound
- Borzoi – A larger sighthound breed with a comparable long, fine coat
