= Sighthound =

Type of dog

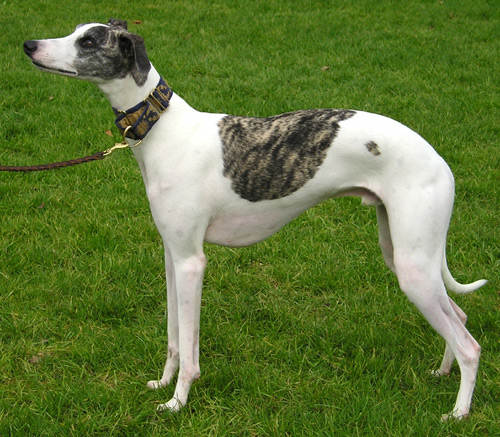
A Whippet: characteristic long legs, deep chest, and narrow waist of a sighthound

Sighthounds (also called gazehounds) are a type of hound dog that hunts primarily by sight and speed, unlike scent hounds, which rely on scent and endurance.

== Appearance ==
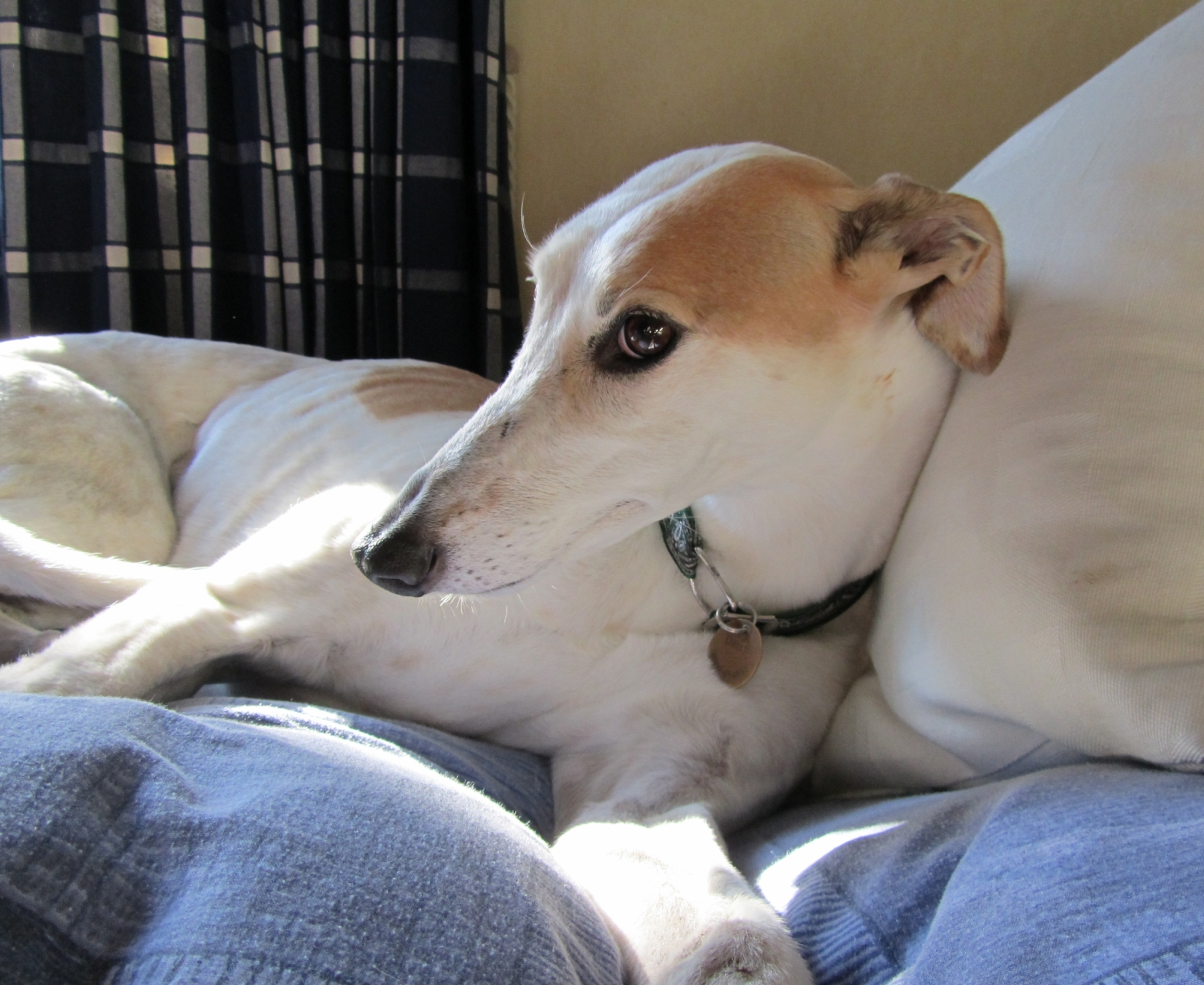
The dolichocephalic head proportions of a typical sighthound

These dogs specialize in pursuing prey, keeping it in sight, and overpowering it by their great speed and agility. They must be able to detect motion quickly, so they have keen vision. Sighthounds must be able to capture fast, agile prey, such as deer and hares, so they have a very flexible back and long legs for a long stride, a deep chest to support an unusually (compared to other dogs) large heart, very efficient lungs for both anaerobic and aerobic sprints, and a lean, wiry body to keep their weight at a minimum. Sighthounds have unique anatomical and physiological features, likely due to intentional selection for hunting by speed and sight; laboratory studies have established reference intervals for hematology and serum biochemical profiles in sighthounds, some of which are shared by all sighthounds and some of which may be unique to one breed.

The typical sighthound type has a light, lean head, which is dolichocephalic in proportion. This shape can create the illusion that their heads are longer than usual. Wolves and other wild dogs are dolichocephalic or mesaticephalic, but some domestic dogs have become brachycephalic (short-headed) due to artificial selection by humans over the course of 12,000 years. Dolichocephalic dogs have a wider field of vision but smaller overlap between the eyes and therefore possibly poorer depth perception in some of their field of view than brachycephalic dogs; most, if not all, dogs have less visual acuity than their antecedent, the wolf. There is no science-based evidence to confirm the popular belief that sighthounds have a higher visual acuity than other types of dogs. However, there is increasing evidence that dolichocephalic dogs, thanks to a higher number of retinal ganglion cells in their "visual streak", retain more heightened sensitivity than other dog types to objects and rapid movement in the horizontal field of vision.

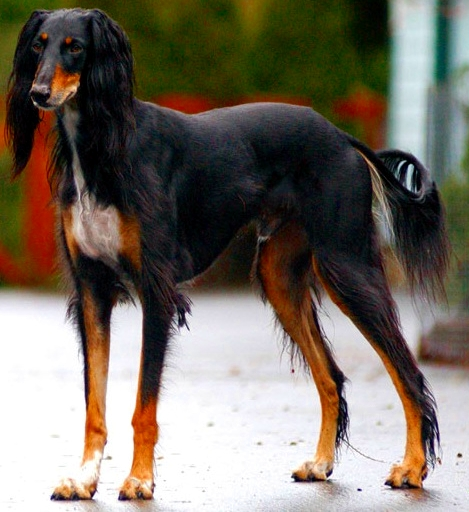
A Saluki

== History ==
Sighthounds such as the Saluki/Sloughi type (both named after the Seleucid Empire) may have existed for at least 5,000 years, with the earliest presumed sighthound remains of a male with a shoulder height around 54 cm, comparable to a Saluki, appearing in the excavations of Tell Brak dated approximately 4,000 years before present. The earliest complete European description of a sighthound and its work, the Celtic vertragus from Roman Spain of the 2nd century C.E., comes from Arrian's Cynegeticus. A similar type, possibly a moderately sized male sighthound, with a height of 61–63 cm, of approximately the same historic period, the Warmington Roman dog is described from a well-preserved skeleton found in England. Sighthound type "gracile" bones, dating from the 8th to 9th century CE, anatomically defined as those of a 70 cm (28 in) high "greyhound", were genetically compared with the modern Greyhound and other sighthounds and found to be almost identical with the modern Greyhound breed, with the exception of only four deletions and one substitution in the DNA sequences, which were interpreted as differences probably arising from 11 centuries of breeding of this type of sighthound. Population genomic analysis proposes that true sighthounds originated independently from native dogs and were comprehensively admixed among breeds, supporting the multiple origins hypothesis of sighthounds.

Although today most sighthounds are kept primarily as pets, some of them may have been bred for as many as thousands of years to detect movement of prey, then chase, capture, and kill it primarily by speed. They thrive on physical activity. Some have mellow personalities, others are watchful or even hostile towards strangers, but the instinct to chase running animals remains strong.

Apart from coursing and hunting, various dog sports are practiced with purebred sighthounds, and sometimes with lurchers and longdogs. Such sports include racing, lure coursing, and other events.

== List of sighthound breeds ==
Name	Origin	Other Names	Image
Afghan Hound	Afghanistan	Sag-e Tāzī	
Azawakh	Mali, Niger, Burkina Faso		
Borzoi	Russia	Russian Hunting Sighthound	
Chart Polski	Poland	Polish Greyhound	
Chippiparai	India		
Chortai	Ukraine		
Cirneco dell'Etna	Italy		
Deerhound	Scotland	Scottish Deerhound	
Galgo Español	Spain	Spanish Greyhound	
Greyhound	England	English Greyhound	
Irish Wolfhound	Ireland		
Italian Greyhound	Italy	Piccolo Levriero Italiano	
Kaikadi	India		
Kanni	India		
Kazakh Tazy	Kazakhstan	Kumai Tazy	
Kritikos Lagonikos	Greece	Cretan Hound	
Levriero Sardo	Italy		
Magyar Agár	Hungary	Hungarian Greyhound	
Mudhol Hound	India		
Old Croatian Sighthound†	Croatia / Bosnia-Herzegovina		
Patagonian Greyhound	Argentina	Galgo Barbucho Patagónico	
Pharaoh Hound	Malta	Kelb tal-Fenek	
Rampur Greyhound	India		
Saluki	Middle East	Persian Greyhound	
Sarail Hound	Bangladesh		
Silken Windhound	USA		
Sloughi	North Africa	Arabian Greyhound	
Taigan	Kyrgyzstan	Kyrgyz Taighany	
Whippet	England		
Xigou	China	Xian Hound, Shanxi Xigou, Xiquan, Xiliegou, Xiǎn	

=== Crossbreed sighthound types ===
Name	Origin	Breeds Used	Image
American Staghound	USA	Greyhound, Scottish Deerhound, Irish Wolfhound, Borzoi, Saluki, Whippet	
Kangaroo hound	Australia	Greyhound, Scottish Deerhound, Irish Wolfhound, Borzoi, Saluki	
Longdog		Mix between sighthounds	
Lurcher		Sighthound + herding dog or terrier	

== Breeds considered to be controversial, not having by origin a sighthound function ==
A number of breeds or types of dogs which do not hunt solely by speed and sight, as well as a number of non-hunting breeds, are currently recognized as sighthounds, either formally or informally by kennel clubs, or lure and live coursing clubs. These include:

- Andalusian Hound
- Basenji
- Cirneco dell'Etna
- Ibizan Hound (Podenco Ibicenco)
- Peruvian Inca Orchid
- Pharaoh Hound (Kelb tal-fenek)
- Podenco Canario
- Portuguese Podengo
- Rhodesian Ridgeback
- Thai Ridgeback

== Kennel club classification ==
When competing in conformation shows, most Anglophone kennel clubs, including the American Kennel Club and The Kennel Club (UK), group pedigree sighthound breeds together with scent hounds in a Hound Group, the Fédération Cynologique Internationale groups them in a dedicated Sighthound Group, whilst the United Kennel Club groups them in a Sighthound and Pariah Group.

== See also ==
- Dog type
- Hound
- Hunting dog
- Scent hound
