= Sarail Hound =

Breed of dog indigenous to Bangladesh

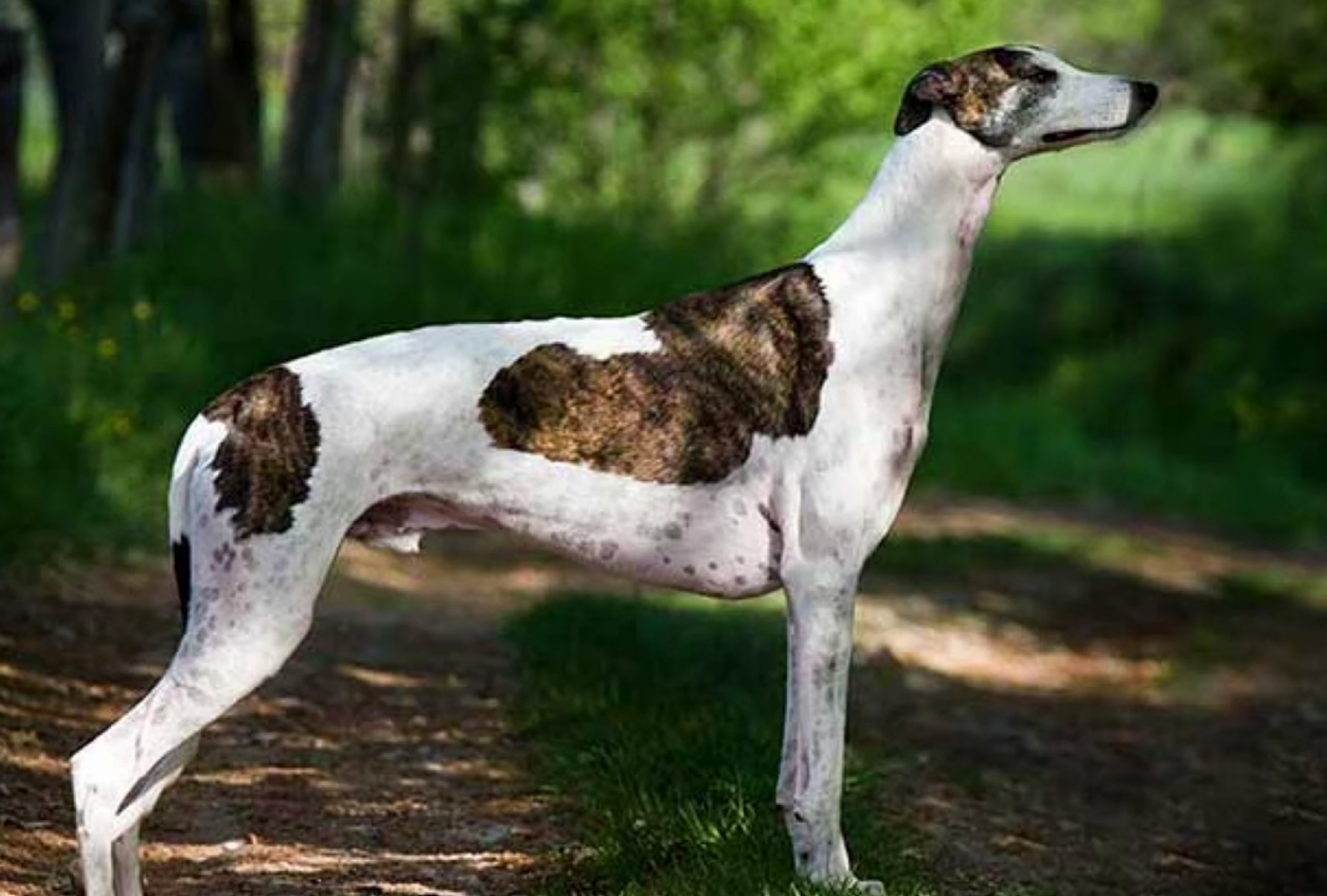
- A Sarail Hound.
- Other names: Bengal Hound, Soriala Greyhound, Bangladesh Hound
- Origin: Bangladesh
Traits
| Height | Males | 64–71 cm (25–28 in) |
| | Females | 58–66 cm (23–26 in) |
| Weight | Males | 22–33 kg (49–73 lb) |
| | Females | 18–28 kg (40–62 lb) |
- Coat: Short thin coat
- Colour: Brown and white brindle, black & white

Sarail Hound (Bengali: সরাইল হাউন্ড), also known as Bengal Hound, is a breed of dog indigenous to Bangladesh. This dog, which is the only breed native to Bangladesh, is found in the Sarail Upazila of the Brahmanbaria District. Known for their strong bone structure, elongated bodies, sharp eyesight and speed, these dogs were traditionally used for hunting and security. However, this breed is currently on the verge of extinction, and they can be found in a few families across Sarail.

== History ==
The Sarail Hound, believed to have been developed from Arabian-originated Saluki and other Middle Eastern sighthounds, was bred over centuries by the Mughal nobility in the Brahmanbaria District, Bangladesh. Over history, these hounds were regarded as among the finest both as hunting companions and watchdogs, frequently being employed in police and military operations. A historical record of interest regarding the breed is that of General M. A. G. Osmani, Commander-in-Chief of Bangladesh Army, who was saved by a Sarail Hound when he was supposedly ambushed.

== Temperament ==
The breed is known for its charming and mild nature, which, along with its grace and speed, makes it beloved by all. It is a gentle, intelligent and highly trainable breed, displaying alertness and boldness and, at times, can be ferocious to the point of chasing large animals.

== See also ==
- List of dog breeds
