= Polish Greyhound =

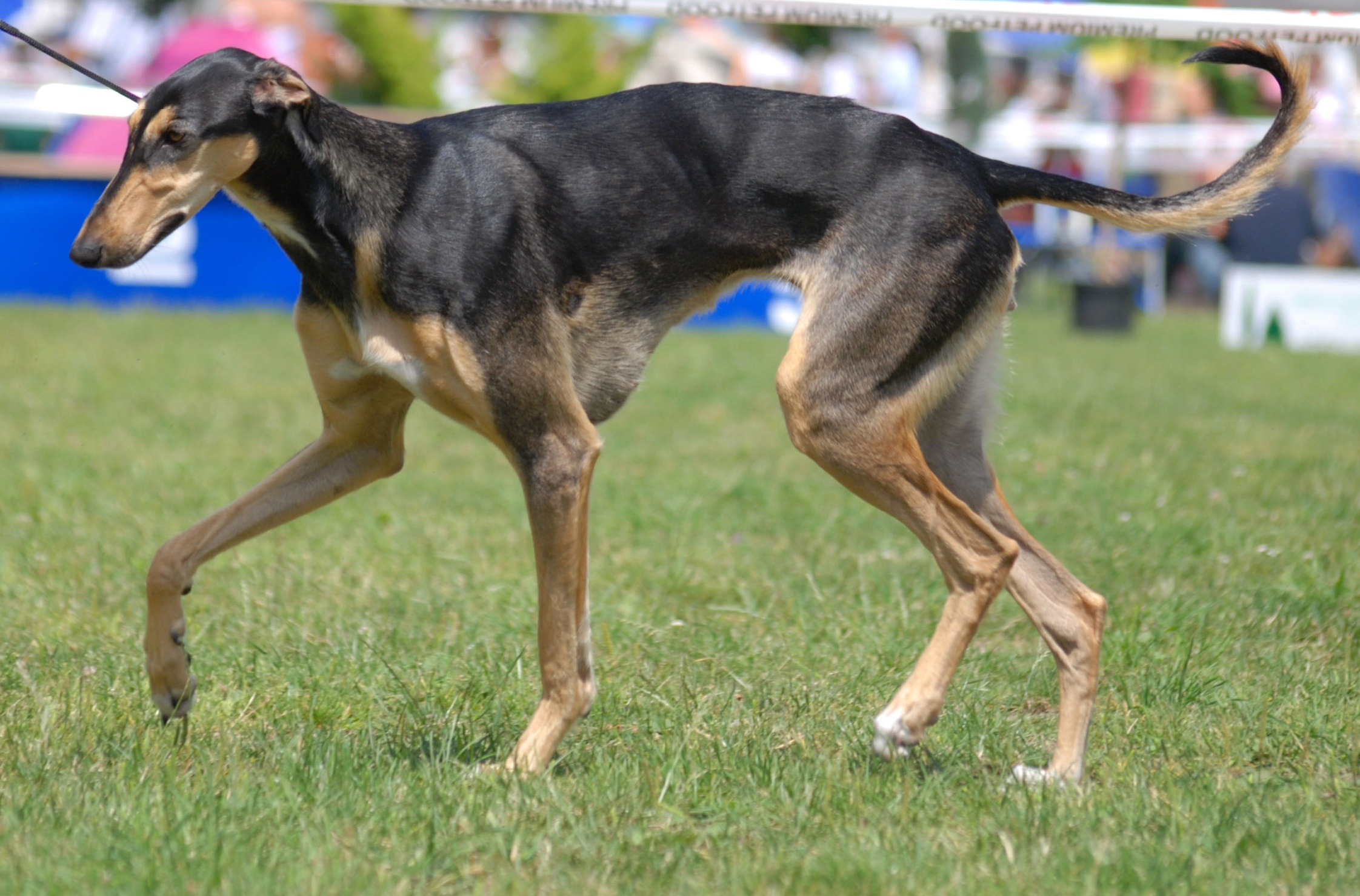
- A male Polish Greyhound
- Other names: Polish Sighthound; Chart Polski (Polish); Polnischer Windhund (German)
- Origin: Poland
Traits
- Height: 27-32 inches (68-81 centimeters)
- Weight: 60-70 pounds (27-31 kilograms)
Kennel club standards
- Fédération Cynologique Internationale: standard

The Polish Greyhound (Polish: chart polski, pronounced [xart ˈpɔlskʲi]) is a Polish sighthound breed. Despite its name, it is not a direct relative of the Greyhound dog.

== History ==
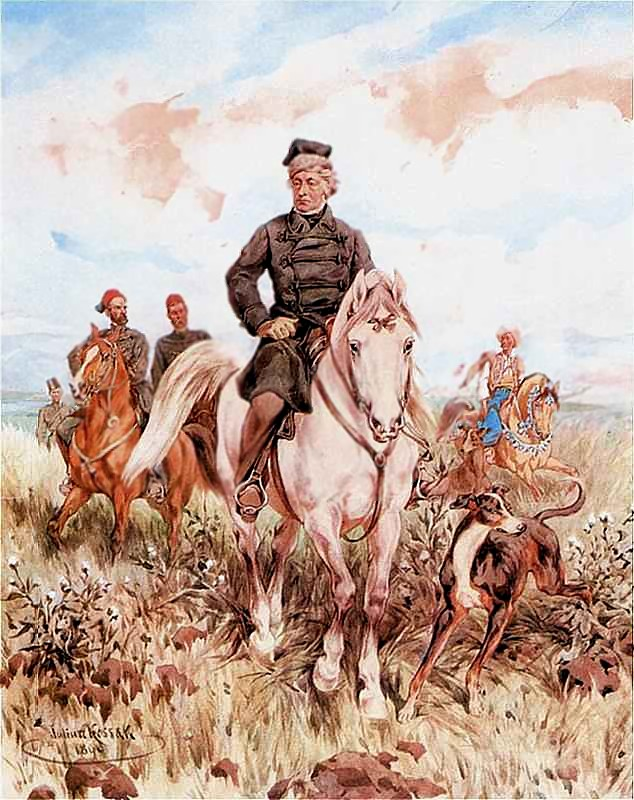
A painting by Juliusz Kossak depicting Adam Mickiewicz and Sadyk Pasha hunting with Polish Greyhounds in Hüdavendigâr Eyalet, 1890

The first records for the existence of greyhounds in Poland come from the times of Gallus Anonymus. Polish Greyhounds have also been referenced in hunting literature and artwork since the 13th century. Thought to have the same ancestors as the Hortaya Borzaya and Borzoi, the Polish Greyhound was originally bred to hunt great bustards and wolves. The Polish Greyhound was considered the favorite dog of the Polish nobility.

After World War II, breeding of the Polish Greyhound in Poland largely disappeared. In the 1970s, enthusiasts began efforts to restore the breed and modern breeding was initiated by Stanisław Czerniakowski. A preliminary studbook was opened in 1981. On 13 June 1989, the Fédération Cynologique Internationale (FCI) granted the breed provisional recognition; it was definitively recognised on 1 March 2001.

== Appearance ==
Like many sighthounds, the Polish Greyhound has long legs and a slim, muscular build. Fur color varies among the breed, with the most common colors being black, tan, blue, and beige. They are double coated, with a rough undercoat that thickens in the winter to provide insulation. The Polish Greyhound's tail is long and sickle-shaped, curving upward at the end. On average, males tend to be between 27–32 inches tall, while females range from 26–30 inches tall. The average weight of a Polish Greyhound is between 60–70 lbs.

== Temperament ==
Protective and territorial, they tend to be affectionate with their owners but reserved around strangers.

== See also ==
- List of dog breeds

== Bibliography ==
- Eva Maria Krämer: Rasy psów. Warszawa: Oficyna Wydawnicza MULTICO, 1998, s. 294. ISBN 83-7073-122-8.
- Goleman, M., Balicki, I., Radko, A., Rozempolska-Rucińska, I. and Zięba, G., 2021. Pedigree and Molecular Analyses in the Assessment of Genetic Variability of the Polish Greyhound. Animals, 11(2), p. 353.
