= Azawakh =

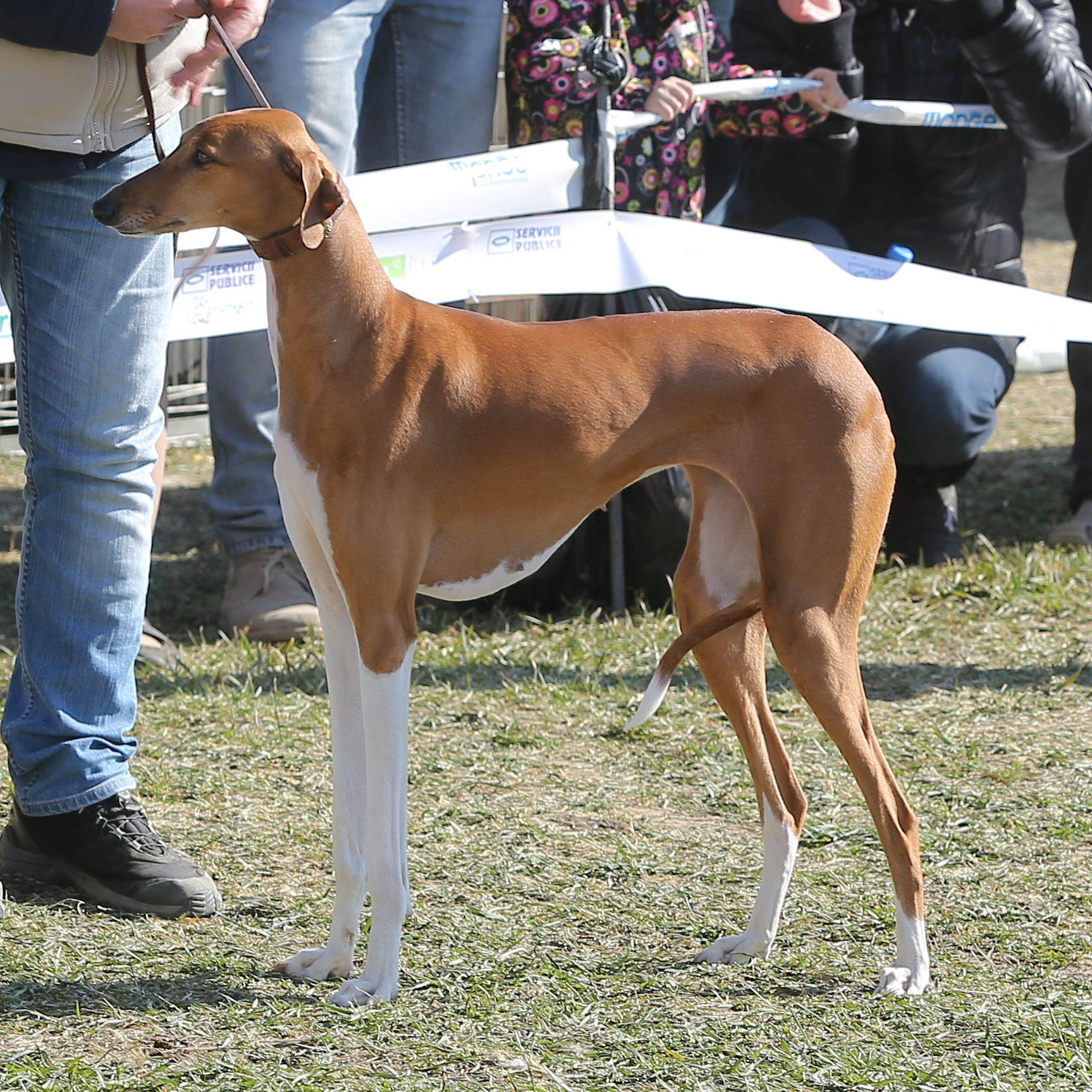
- Azawakh female
- Other names: Idi; Hanshee; Oska; Rawondu; Bareeru; Wulo (formerly) Tuareg Sloughi
- Origin: Mali, Niger, Burkina Faso
Traits
Height	Males	64–74 cm (25–29 in)
	Females	60–70 cm (24–28 in)
Weight	Males	20–25 kg (44–55 lb)
	Females	15–20 kg (33–44 lb)
- Coat: Short, fine
- Color: Fawn
Kennel club standards
- Fédération Cynologique Internationale: standard

The Azawakh is a breed of dog from West Africa. With ancient origins, it is raised throughout the Sahelian zone of Mali, Niger, and Burkina Faso. This region includes the Azawagh Valley for which the breed is named. While commonly associated with the nomadic Tuareg people, the dogs are also bred and owned by other ethnic groups, such as the Peulh, Bella, and Hausa. The Azawakh is more related to the Sloughi than it is to the Saluki.

== Description ==
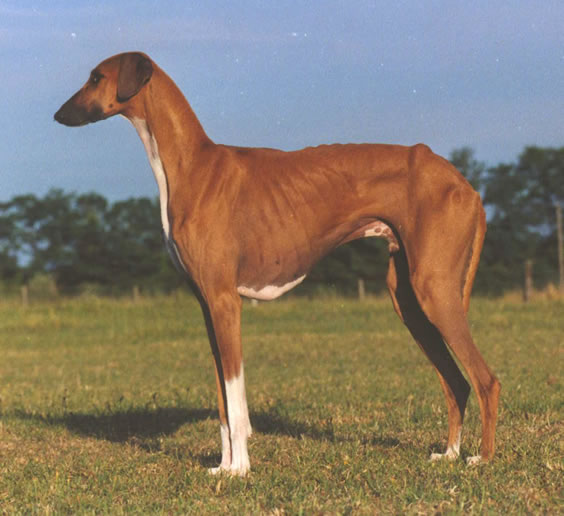
A male Azawakh

=== Appearance ===
Slim and elegant, with bone structure and muscles showing through thin skin. Eyes are almond-shaped.

The coat is very short and almost absent on the belly. Its bone structure shows clearly through the skin and musculature. Its muscles are "dry", meaning that they are quite flat, unlike the Greyhound and Whippet. In this respect it is similar in type to the Saluki.

=== Colours ===
Colours permitted by the Fédération Cynologique Internationale (FCI) breed standard are clear sand to dark fawn/brown, red and brindle (with or without a dark mask), with white bib, tail tip, and white on all feet (which can be tips of toes to high stockings). Since 2015 white stockings that go above the elbow joint are considered disqualifying features in the FCI member countries, as is a white collar or half collar (Irish marked).

Some conservationists support the idea that in Africa, Azawakhs are still found in a variety of colours such as red, blue fawn (that is, with a lilac cast), grizzle, and, rarely, blue and black with various white markings including Irish marked (white collar) and particolour (mostly white). Because of this wide color variation in the native population, the American standard used by the AKC and UKC allows any color combination found in Africa.

=== Movement ===
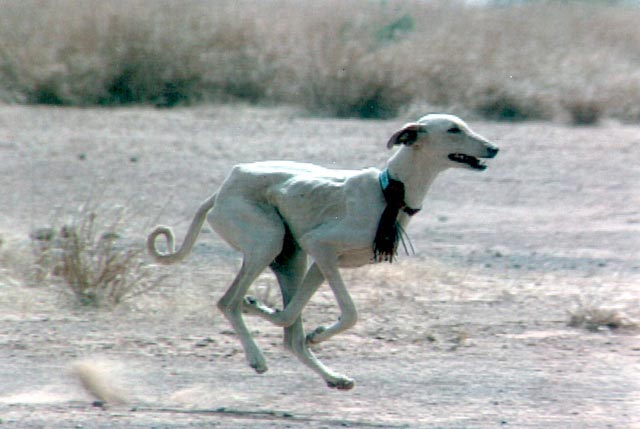
Azawakh in motion

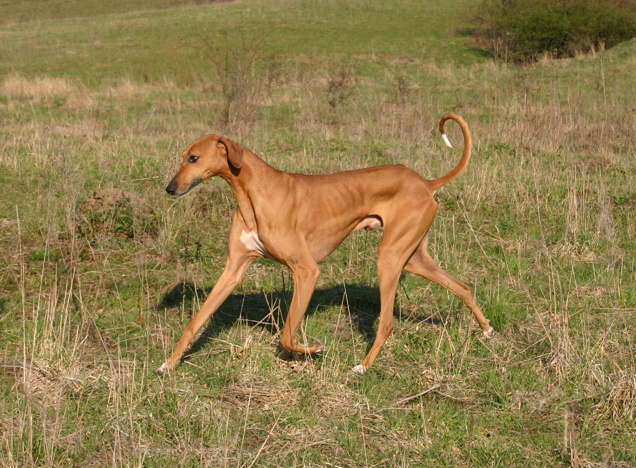
Azawakh in movement

The Azawakh's light, supple, lissome gait is a notable breed characteristic, as is an upright double suspension gallop.

== Temperament ==
Bred by the Tuareg, Fula and various other nomads of the Sahara and sub-Saharan Sahel in the countries of Mali, Niger, Burkina Faso, and southern Algeria, the breed known by the Tuaregs as ”Oska” was used there as a guard dog and to hunt gazelle and hare at speeds up to 65 km/h (40 mph). The austerity of the Sahel environment has ensured that only the most fit dogs survive and has accentuated the breed's ruggedness and independence. Unlike some other sighthounds, the Azawakh is more of a pack hunter and they bump down the quarry with hindquarters when it has been tired out. In role of a guard dog, if an Azawakh senses danger it will bark to alert the other members of the pack, and they will gather together as a pack under the lead of the alpha dog, then chase off or attack the predator.

Unlike other sighthounds, the primary function of the Azawakh in its native land is that of a guard dog. It develops an intense bond with its owner, and tend to be reserved with strangers.

Azawakh have high energy and tremendous endurance. They are excellent training companions for runners. Many Azawakh dislike rain and cold weather.

Azawakh are pack oriented and form complex social hierarchies. They have tremendous memories and are able to recognize each other after long periods of separation. They can often be found sleeping on top of each other for warmth and companionship.

== Breed history ==
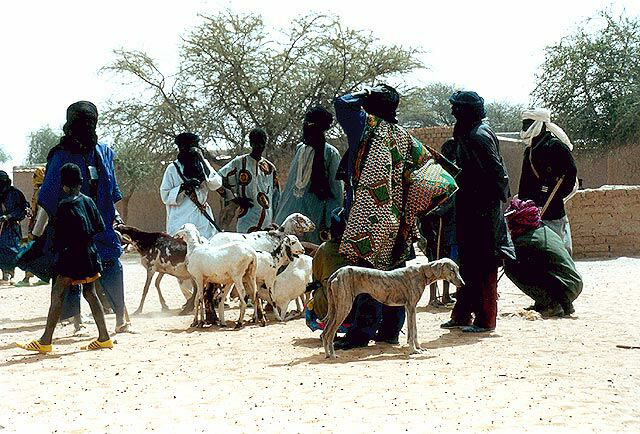
Azawakh among the Tuareg

The breed is relatively uncommon in Europe and North America. Azawakh may be registered with the FCI in the USA via the Federación Canófila de Puerto Rico (FCPR). European FCI clubs and the AKC recognize the FCPR as an acceptable registry. The AKC recognized the Azawakh a member of the Hound group in 2019. The American Azawakh Association (AAA) is the AKC Parent Club for the Azawakh. Azawakh may be registered with the UKC and ARBA. The breed is not yet registered by CKC. Azawakh are eligible for ASFA and AKC lure coursing and NOFCA open field coursing events.

== See also ==
- List of dog breeds
