= Greyhound =

Dog breed

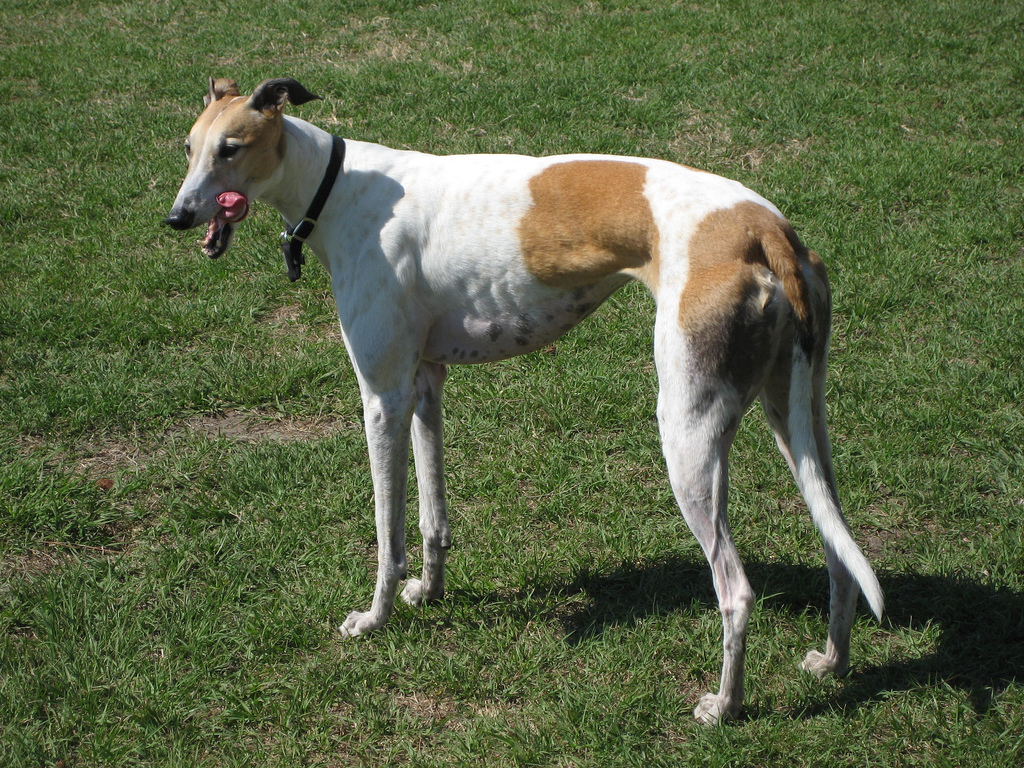
- Origin: England
Traits
Height	Males	71 to 76 centimetres (28 to 30 in)
	Females	68 to 71 centimetres (27 to 28 in)
Weight	Males	27 to 40 kilograms (60 to 88 lb)*
	Females	25 to 34 kilograms (55 to 75 lb)*; *Normal weight range
- Litter size: 1–12 pups
Kennel club standards
- The Kennel Club: standard
- Fédération Cynologique Internationale: standard

The Greyhound is a breed of dog and a sighthound. It is an ancient breed historically developed for hunting game by sight and speed, and has later been used in organised coursing and greyhound racing. Greyhounds are also kept as show dogs and companion animals.

Greyhounds are characterised by a tall, muscular, smooth-coated build, a long tail, tough feet, and a distinctive flexible, "S-shaped" outline typical of sighthounds. They are a distinct breed from other related sighthounds, such as the Italian Greyhound.

The Greyhound's long legs, deep chest, flexible spine, and slim build enable high sprinting speeds. In racing contexts, Greyhounds can reach peak speeds of at least 69 km/h (43 mph), with typical winning speeds of approximately 58–61 km/h (36–38 mph).

== Appearance ==
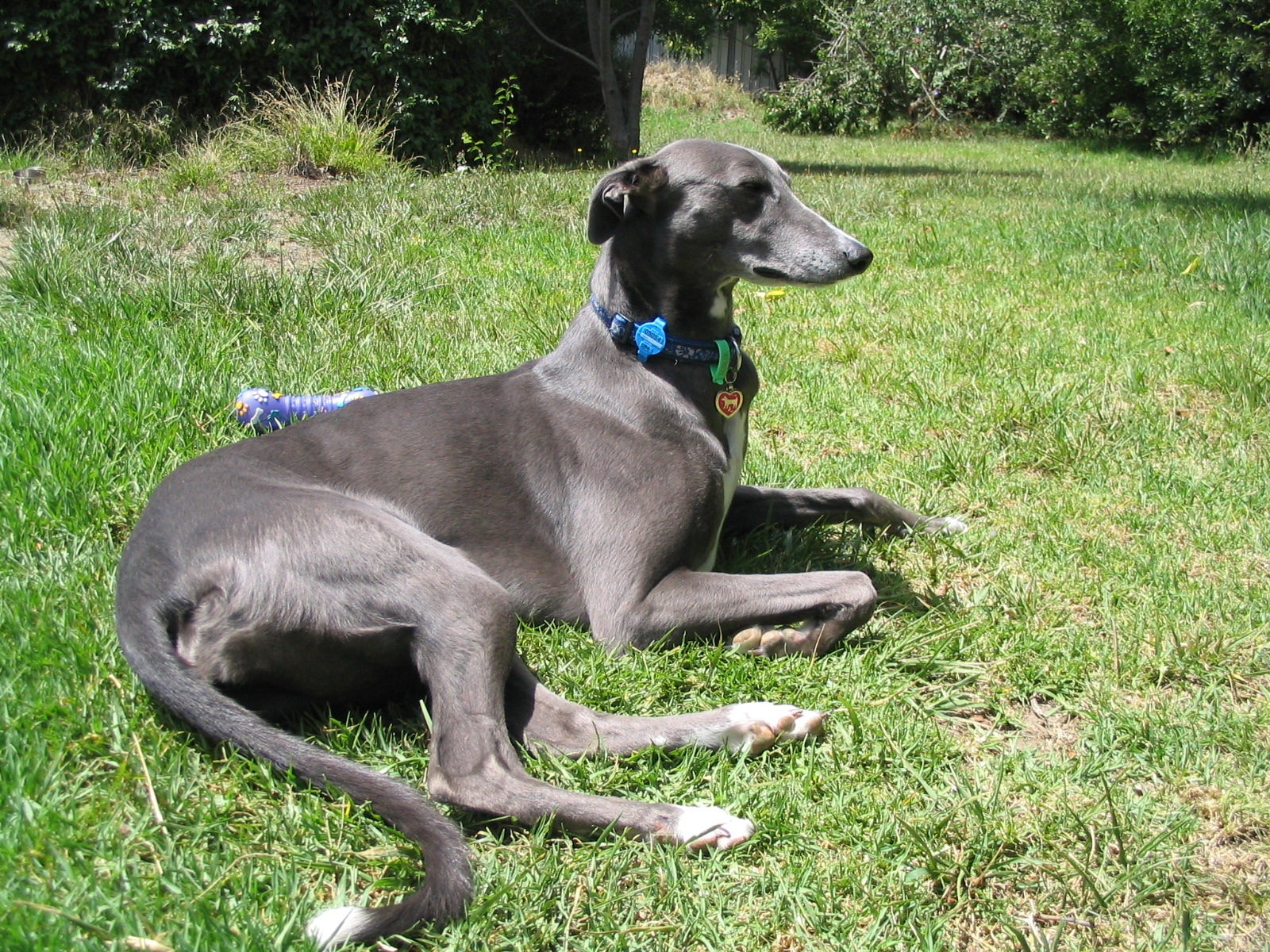
A blue female Greyhound

Males are usually 71 to 76 centimetres (28 to 30 in) tall at the withers, and weigh on average 27 to 40 kilograms (60 to 88 lb). Females tend to be smaller, with shoulder heights ranging from 66 to 71 centimetres (26 to 28 in) and weights from 25 to 34 kilograms (55 to 75 lb), although weights can be above and below these average weights. Greyhounds have very short fur, which is easy to maintain. There are approximately 30 recognized color forms, of which variations of white, brindle, fawn (pale tan to dark deer-red), black, red, and blue (gray) can appear uniquely or in combination. Greyhounds are dolichocephalic, with a skull which is relatively long in comparison to its breadth, and an elongated muzzle.

== Temperament ==
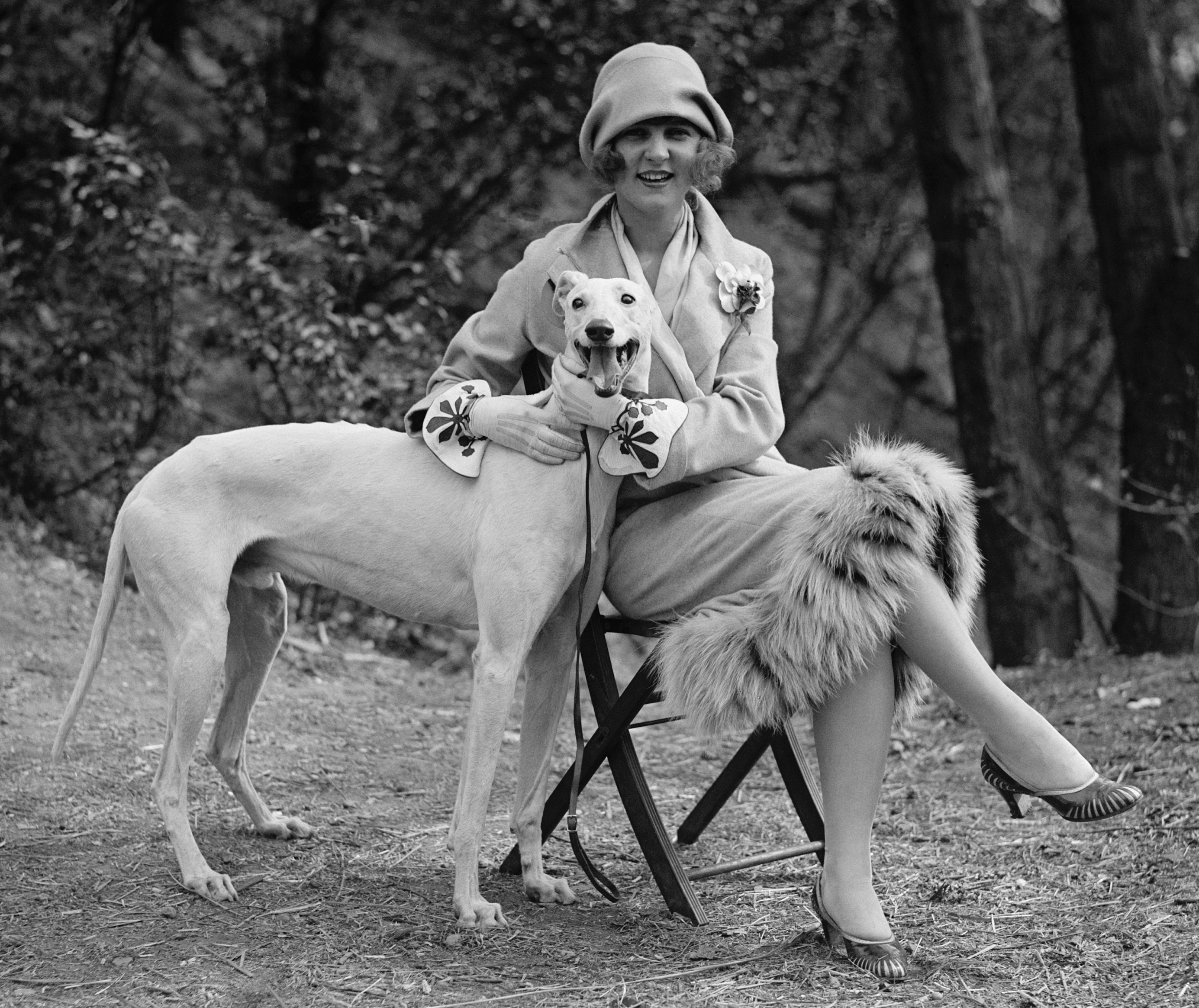
Margaret Gorman with her pet Greyhound, "Long Goodie", in April 1925

Greyhounds are in most cases gentle and affectionate. They do well in families with children, as long as the children are taught to treat the dog properly with politeness and appropriate respect. Greyhounds generally have a sensitive nature, and gentle commands work best as training methods.

Occasionally, a Greyhound may bark; however, they are generally not barkers, which is beneficial in suburban environments, and they are usually as friendly to strangers as they are with their own families. A 2008 University of Pennsylvania study found that Greyhounds are one of the least aggressive dog breeds towards strangers, owners, and other dogs. However, Greyhounds can be prone to sleep startle/sleep aggression if suddenly disturbed while napping. Owners can encounter this problem, as many Greyhounds sleep with their eyes at least partially open, appearing awake.

A survey of those adopting rescue Greyhounds found that Greyhound adoptions have higher short term adoption success than shelters. The survey also found reported hyperactivity levels to be below that of shelter dogs.

Greyhounds tend to be outgoing, happy and sociable with people and seem to relish human contact, even following owners from room to room at home (known colloquially as being a "Velcro dog"). Small animals including cats may be the subject of prey-driven behaviour by Greyhounds.

== Companion ==
Historically, the Greyhound has, since its first appearance as a hunting type and breed, enjoyed a specific degree of fame and definition in Western literature, heraldry and art as the most elegant or noble companion and hunter of the canine world. In modern times, the professional racing industry, with its large numbers of track-bred Greyhounds, as well as international adoption programs aimed at re-homing dogs has redefined the breed as a sporting dog that will supply friendly companionship in its retirement. This has been prevalent in recent years due to track closures in the United States. Outside the racing industry and coursing community, the Kennel Clubs' registered breed still enjoys a modest following as a show dog and pet.

As a result of their breeding and training, Greyhounds can have a strong prey drive, but little or no recall response. This puts a released Greyhound at risk of injury or death if they run into a wire fence, or traffic. Further, other small pets may be mistaken for prey. Greyhound re-homing bodies therefore recommend that Greyhounds remain leashed at all times unless inside a fully secure and fenced area.

Some jurisdictions, such as Victoria and Western Australia mandate leashes for Greyhounds when outdoors.

== Health and physiology ==
Illustration of the Greyhound skeleton

A 2024 UK study found a life expectancy of 11.5 years for the breed compared to an average of 12.7 for purebreeds and 12 for crossbreeds. A 2005 Swedish study of insurance data found 60% of Greyhounds died by the age of 10, higher than the overall rate of 35% of dogs dying by the age of 10.

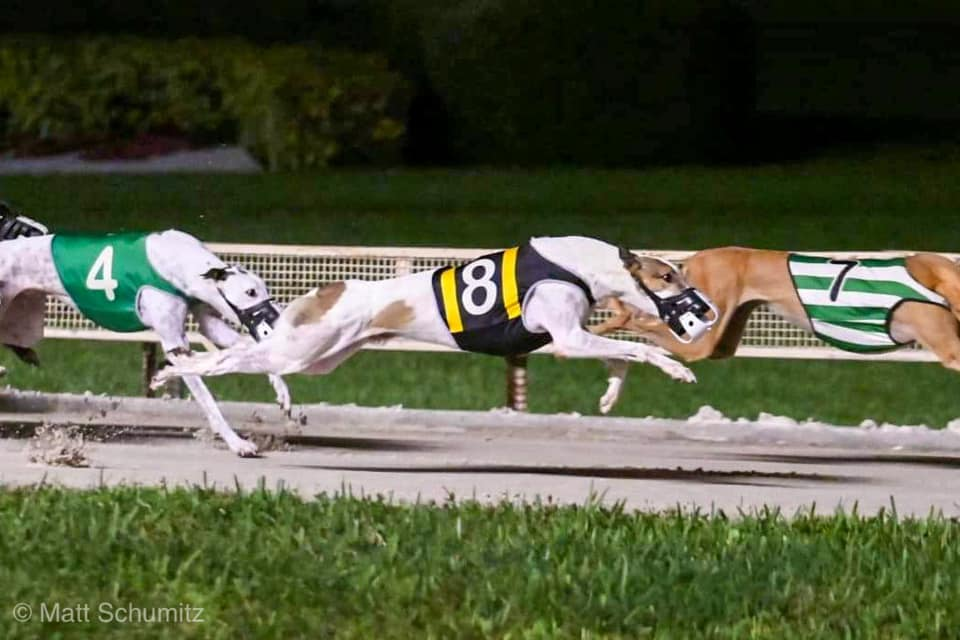
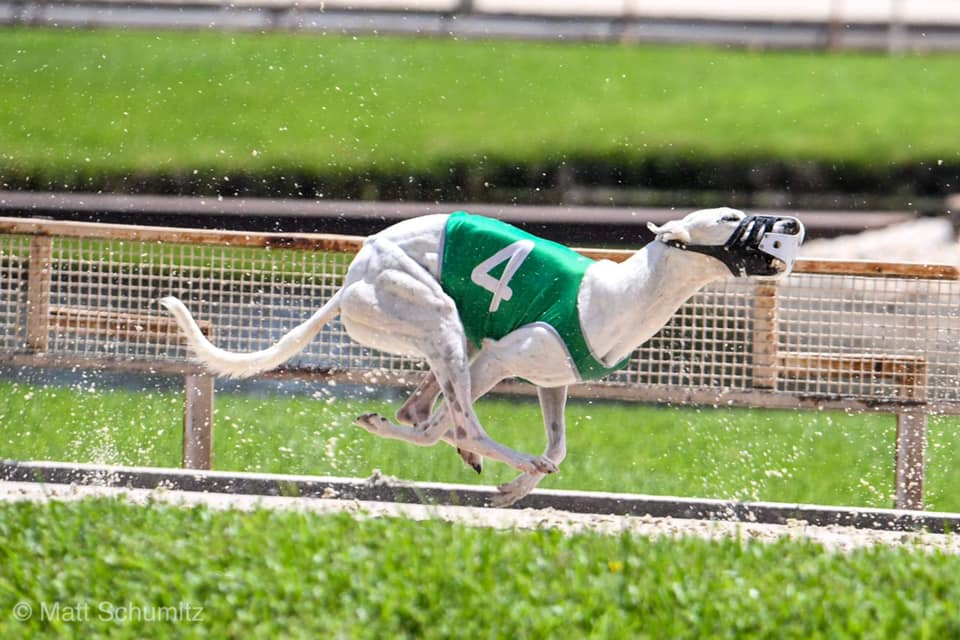
A Greyhound in the extended (top) phase and the contracted phase of double rotary suspension (fully airborne) gallop

The speed of a Greyhound is due to its light but muscular build, large heart, highest percentage of oxidative–glycolytic fast twitch muscle fibers (Type IIa) of any breed, double suspension gallop, and extreme flexibility of its spine. "Double suspension rotary gallop" describes the fastest running gait of the Greyhound in which all four feet are free from the ground in two phases, contracted and extended, during each full stride.

Compared to humans, the activity of the anaerobic enzyme lactate dehydrogenase in Greyhound muscles is about three times higher, but even so, their lactate dehydrogenase activity is lower than that muscles of antelopes and cheetahs when these are also compared to humans. The activity of the aerobic enzyme citrate synthase is comparable to that of human endurance runners; this indicates muscles capable of both high speeds and high endurance.

The musculature of both hindlimbs constitutes more than 18% of their body mass. The proportion of both forelimbs muscle mass is very similar. The proportion of back musculature is 12% of their body mass.

Due to the Greyhound's unique physiology and anatomy, a veterinarian who understands the issues relevant to the breed is generally needed when the dogs need treatment, particularly when anesthesia is required. Greyhounds cannot metabolize barbiturate-based anesthesia in the same way that other breeds can because their livers have lower amounts of oxidative enzymes. Greyhounds demonstrate unusual blood chemistry, which can be misread by veterinarians not familiar with the breed and can result in an incorrect diagnosis.

Greyhounds are very sensitive to insecticides. Many vets do not recommend the use of flea collars or flea spray on Greyhounds if the product is pyrethrin-based. Products like Advantage, Frontline, Lufenuron, and Amitraz are safe for use on Greyhounds, however, and are very effective in controlling fleas and ticks.

Greyhounds have higher levels of red blood cells than other breeds. Since red blood cells carry oxygen to the muscles, this higher level allows the hound to move larger quantities of oxygen faster from the lungs to the muscles. Conversely, Greyhounds have lower levels of platelets than other breeds.

Delayed haemorrhage following trauma or routine surgery is more common in Greyhounds, with one study reporting significant haemorrhage in 26% of Greyhounds following routine gonadectomy, compared to 0-2% in other dog breeds. This is often termed Greyhound fibrinolytic syndrome or breed-associated hyperfibrinolysis, wherein there is a disorder of the fibrinolysis system without derangement of the primary or secondary coagulation systems, and is also not related to platelet count. In this syndrome there is initial adequate hemostasis following trauma or routine surgical procedures, however 36–48 hours later the site undergoes inappropriate hyperfibrinolysis. This results in delayed bleeding which can result in significant morbidity and mortality. Standard pre-operative blood work does not identify those at risk It is distinct from common bleeding disorders in other breeds such as von Willebrand's disease, which is uncommon in Greyhounds. Although high-quality research data are lacking, it is thought that this condition can be prevented and treated by administering antifibrinolytic medication such as tranexamic acid via the oral or parenteral route. Intensive care and blood product administration may also be required in severe cases.

Greyhounds do not have undercoats and thus are less likely to trigger dog allergies in humans (they are sometimes incorrectly referred to as "hypoallergenic"). The lack of an undercoat, coupled with a general lack of body fat, also makes Greyhounds more susceptible to extreme temperatures (both hot and cold); because of this, they must be housed inside. Some Greyhounds are susceptible to corns on their paw pads; a variety of methods are used to treat them.

Thyroxine levels in the Greyhound are below the normal reference range for dogs; thyroxine response to thyroid-stimulating hormone is also lowered. This can impact testing for thyroid disease but it is not a concern for health.

== History ==
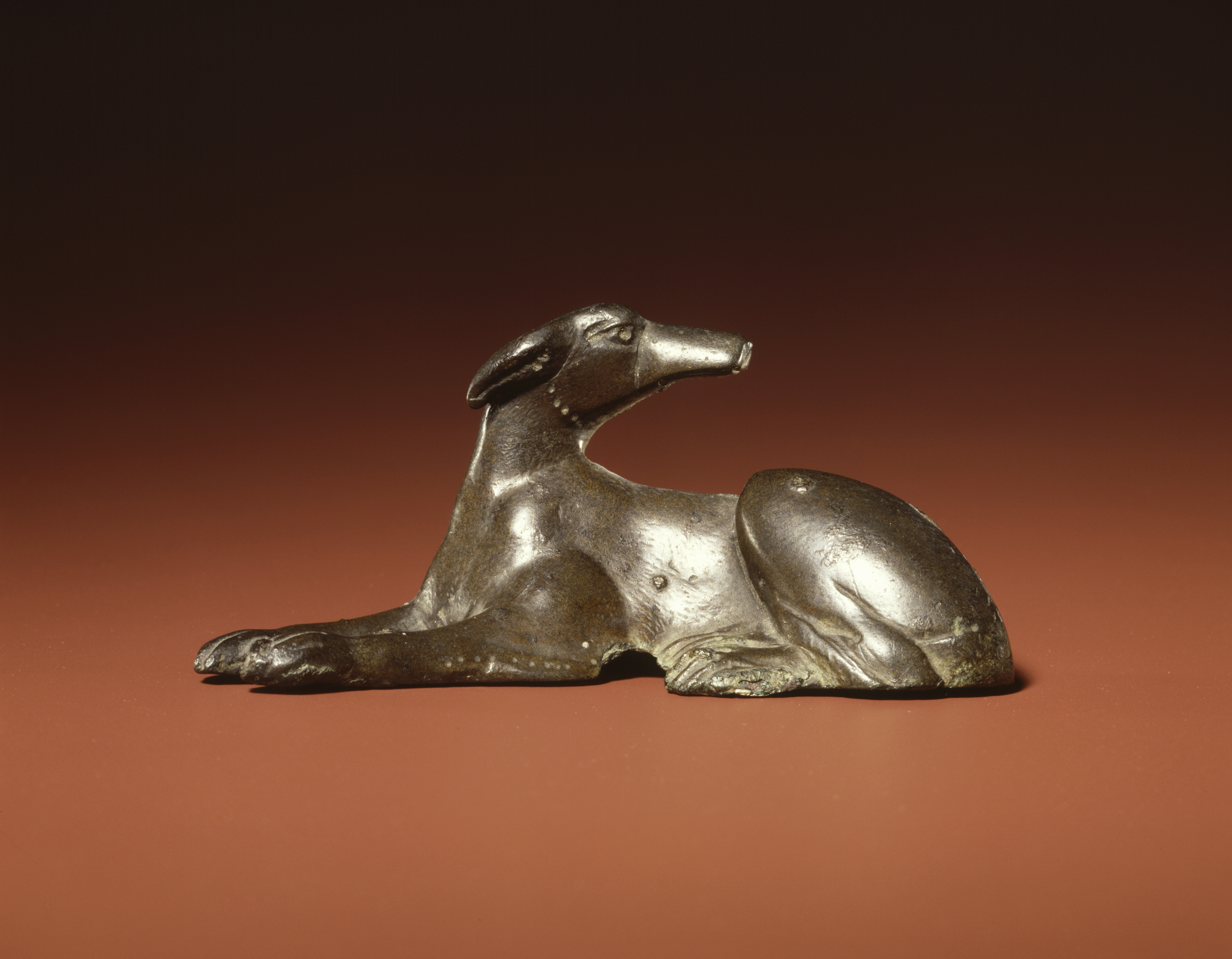
Bronze figure probably of a vertragus (sighthound), Roman period (50–270 AD)

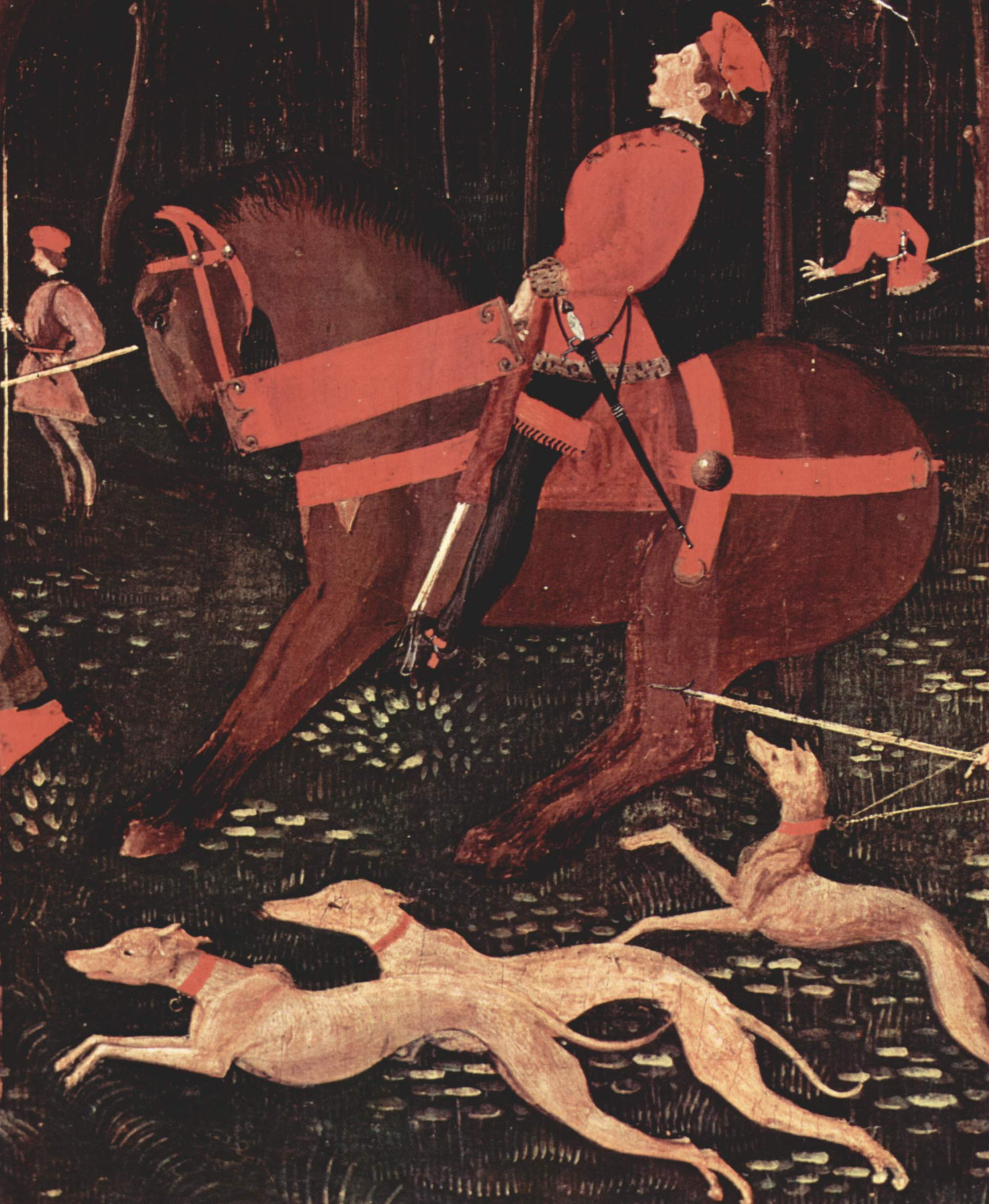
Sighthounds unleashed in Paolo Uccello's The Hunt in the Forest (Ashmolean Museum) (1470)

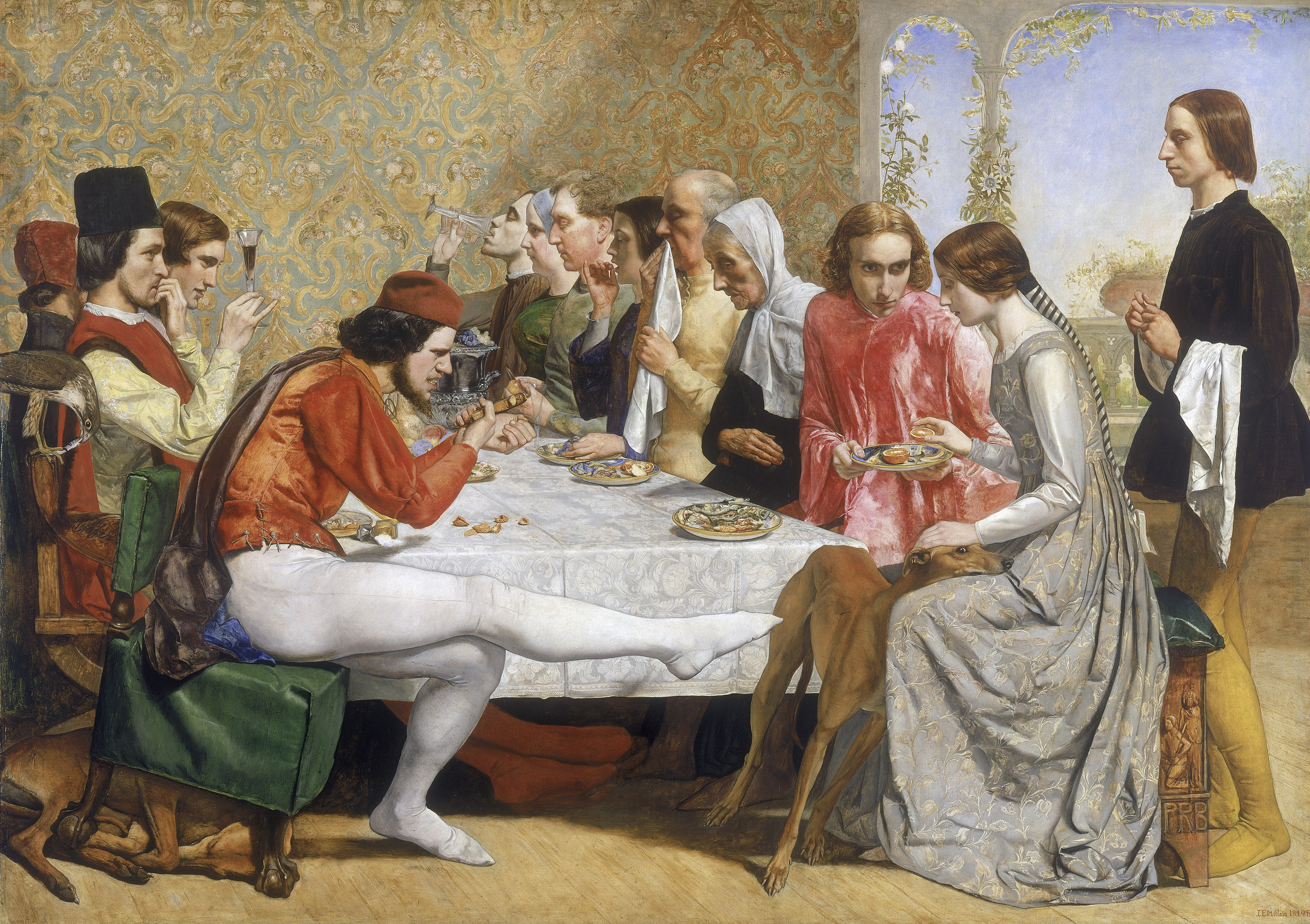
A greyhound (also one under the chair) depicted in Isabella, the 1849 Pre-Raphaelite painting by Millais

=== Origins ===
"The true origin of the Greyhound is unsure, but drawings of findings from the Çatalhöyük site in Turkey (6000 BC), the finding of a Greyhound-like dog in a funeral vase in the town of Fusa in Iran (4200 BC) or in rock art in Tassili (dated at 5000 – 2000 BC) indicate that the Greyhound is indeed one of the oldest breeds of dog."

The ancient skeletal remains of a dog identified as being of the Greyhound/saluki form were excavated at Tell Brak in modern Syria, and dated as being approximately 4,000 years old. Dogs that look similar to Salukis and Greyhounds were increasingly depicted on Egyptian tombs from the Middle Kingdom (2134 BC–1785 BC) onward.

Historical literature by Arrian on the vertragus (from the Latin vertragus, a word of Celtic origin), the first recorded sighthound in Europe and possible antecedent of the Greyhound, suggested that its origin lies with the Celts from Eastern Europe or Eurasia. Systematic archaeozoology of Britain conducted in 1974 ruled out the existence of a true Greyhound-type in Britain prior to the Roman occupation, which was further confirmed in 2000. Written evidence from the early period of Roman occupation, the Vindolanda tablets (No. 594), demonstrate that the occupying troops from Continental Europe either had with them in the North of England, or certainly knew of, the vertragus and its hunting use.

During the Middle Ages, Greyhounds could only be owned by rulers and nobles, having long been associated with heraldic symbols of the ruling class in England, France, and the Czech lands.

The earliest archaeological discovery found conclusively to be a Greyhound specifically was at the Chotěbuz fort in the Czech Republic. This comprised sighthound type "gracile" bones dating from the 8th to 9th century AD. These bones matched those of a 70 cm (28 in) high "Greyhound", and were also genetically compared with the modern Greyhound and other sighthounds, and found to be almost completely identical with the modern Greyhound breed, with the exception of only four deletions and one substitution in the DNA sequences, which were interpreted as differences probably arising from 11 centuries of breeding of this type of dog.

All modern pedigree Greyhounds derive from the Greyhound stock recorded and registered first in private studbooks in the 18th century, then in public studbooks in the 19th century, which ultimately were registered with coursing, racing, and kennel club authorities of the United Kingdom. Historically, these sighthounds were used primarily for hunting in the open where their pursuit speed and keen eyesight were essential.

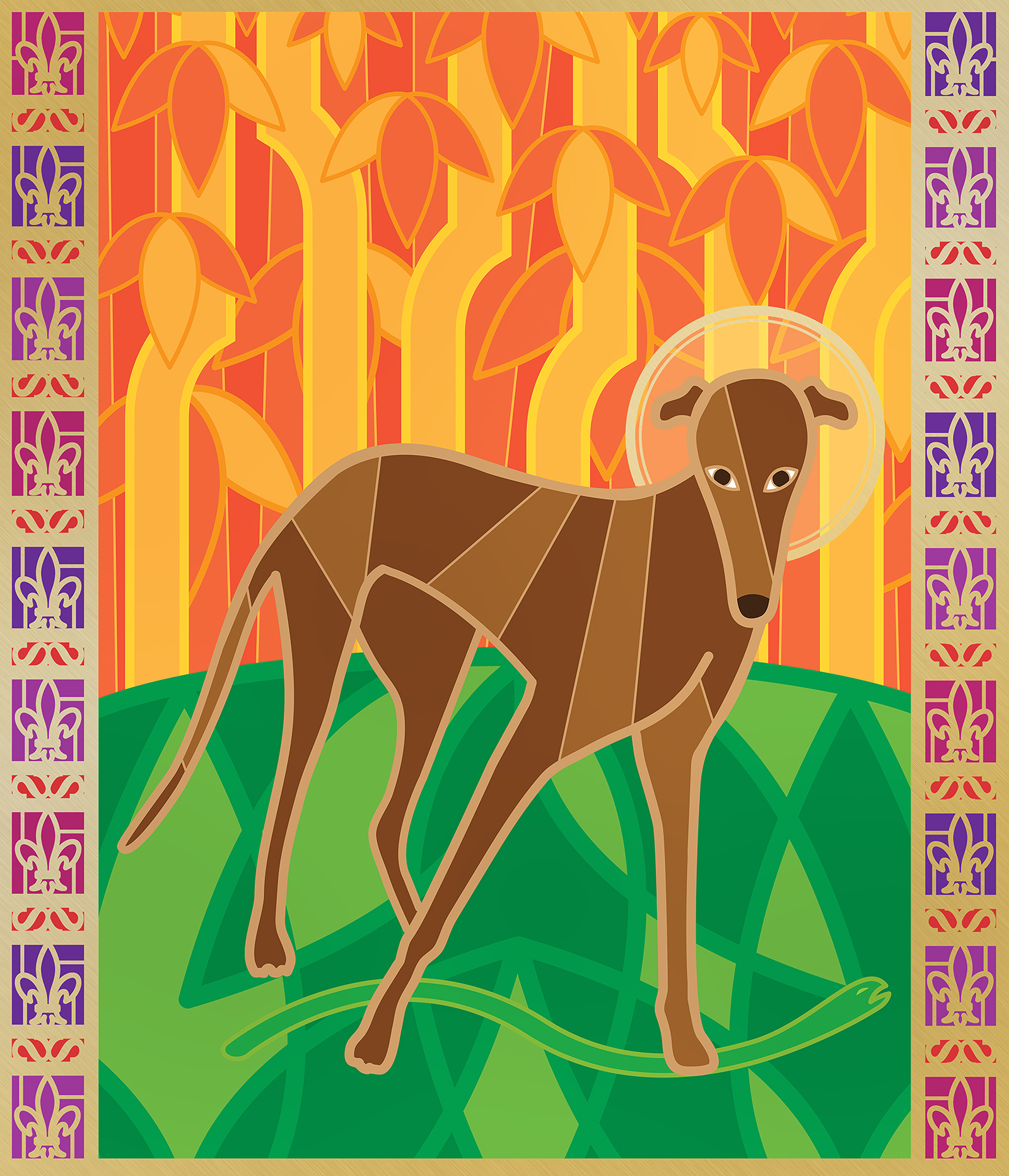
Contemporary illustration of Saint Guinefort, a greyhound sainted by people in the Dombes region of France around the 13th century

=== Etymology ===
The name Greyhound is generally believed to come from the Old English 'grighund'. Hund is the antecedent of the modern "hound", but the meaning of grig is undetermined, other than in reference to dogs in Old English and Old Norse. The word "hund" is still used for dogs in general in Scandinavian languages today. Its origin does not appear to have any common root with the modern word grey for color, and indeed the Greyhound is seen with a wide variety of coat colors. The lighter colors, patch-like markings and white appeared in the breed that was once ordinarily grey in color.

The Greyhound is the only dog mentioned by name in the Bible (Hebrew: זַרְזִיר מׇתְנַיִם, zarir mosna'im) in Proverbs 30:29–31. In context, Proverbs 30 discusses "three that are stately of stride", one of which translates literally from the Hebrew as "that which is tight/girded in the loins/waist". Many versions, including the Jewish Publication Society and King James Version have translated the latter as "greyhound". However, other biblical translations, including the New International Version, have translated the original Hebrew to 'strutting rooster'.

According to Pokorny, the English term 'Greyhound' does not mean "grey dog/hound", but simply "fair dog". Subsequent words have been derived from the Proto-Indo-European root *g'her- "shine, twinkle": English 'grey', Old High German gris "grey, old", Old Icelandic griss "piglet, pig", Old Icelandic gryja "to dawn", gryjandi "morning twilight", Old Irish grian "sun", Old Church Slavonic zorja "morning twilight, brightness". The common sense of these words is "to shine; bright".

In 1928, the first winner of Best in Show at Crufts was breeder/owner Mr. H. Whitley's Greyhound Primley Sceptre. Greyhounds have won the award three times in total, the most recent being in 1956.

Historically, English Greyhounds were grouped: two for coursing, as a "Brace", three for hunting, as a "Leash", otherwise known as a "couple and a half".

== Sport ==
=== Coursing ===
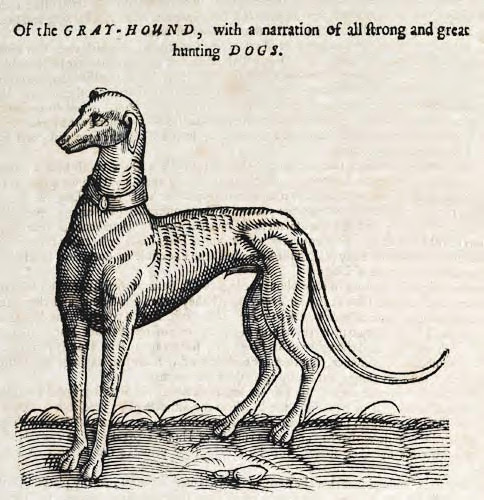
"Gray-Hound" in a 1658 English woodcut

The Greyhound has long been used for hunting by sight in open country, including the coursing of game for meat and sport. In Britain, this later developed into organised competitive hare coursing. Some Greyhounds continue to be used for coursing and related activities, including lure coursing. Modern racing Greyhounds may descend from bloodlines developed for coursing competition, including Irish events such as the Irish Coursing Derby and the Irish Cup.

=== Racing ===
Until the early 20th century, Greyhounds were primarily used for hunting and coursing. During the 1920s, modern greyhound racing was introduced in several countries, including the United States and parts of the United Kingdom and Ireland, beginning with England in 1926. Greyhound racing later became established in Australia and other countries.

Throughout the 20th century, Greyhound racing expanded as a popular spectator sport and gambling activity, influencing the widespread use of Greyhounds for racing rather than hunting. The sport reached peak popularity in the mid-20th century before declining in several countries from the 1960s onwards following changes in betting practices and competition from other forms of entertainment.

In the early 21st century, the scale and geographic distribution of commercial greyhound racing changed significantly. In several jurisdictions, including parts of Australia and the United States, the number of operating tracks declined or commercial racing ceased altogether, while legislative bans or phase-outs were introduced in some regions.

== Heraldry ==
The coat of arms of Henry VII of England features a Greyhound on the sinister of the arms.

== See also ==
- List of dog breeds
- Afghan Hound
- Azawakh
- Borzoi (formerly known as Russian Wolfhound)
- Combai
- Chippiparai
- Fastest animal
- Galgo Español (Spanish Greyhound)
- Hortaya borzaya (Russian shorthaired sighthound)
- Irish Wolfhound
- Italian Greyhound
- Kanni
- Longdog (cross between two sighthound breeds)
- Lurcher (sighthound ancestry)
- Magyar agár (Hungarian Greyhound)
- Mudhol Hound
- Polish Greyhound
- Rajapalayam (India)
- Rampur Greyhound
- Saluki
- Scottish Deerhound
- Sloughi
- Whippet
