= Sloughi =

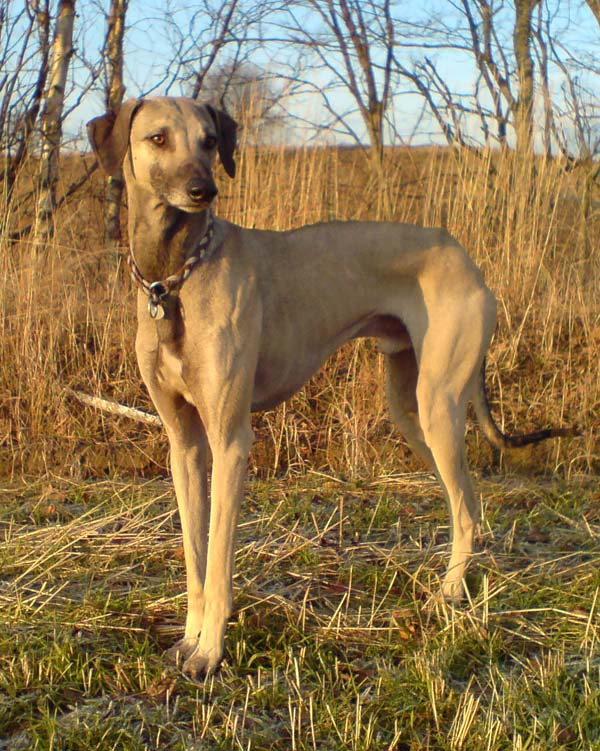
- Other names: Arabian Greyhound
- Origin: Morocco
Traits
Height	Males	66–72 cm (26–28 in)
	Females	61–68 cm (24–27 in)
Weight	Males	22–28 kg (49–62 lb)
	Females	18–24 kg (40–53 lb)
Kennel club standards
- Fédération Cynologique Internationale: standard

The Sloughi (/ˈsluːɡi/; Arabic: سلوقي), Arabian Greyhound, or Berber Greyhound is an ancient breed of domesticated dog, a member of the sighthound family. It originates from Morocco and is found also in Algeria, Tunisia, Libya, and Egypt.

== History ==
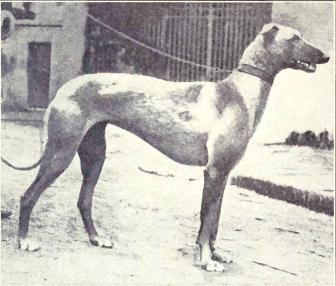
Arabian Greyhound circa 1915

The Sloughi has existed for centuries in North Africa, primarily in Algeria, Morocco, Tunisia, Libya and Egypt. The word sloughi is a different pronunciation of the Arabic saluki, the similarly-looking and -behaving Arabian sighthound; the two breeds likely share a common ancestor. Algerian Neolithic rock paintings, plus tomb paintings and hieroglyphics in Egypt, have been discovered portraying distinctly slender dogs with drooped ears, hinting at the breed's earlier origins. Sloughis are still used for hunting in North African countries, as well as being a reliable familial guard dog. The Sloughi was accepted into the FCI in 1998, receiving recognition by the American Kennel Club as recently as January 1, 2016, and being able to compete in the AKC Hound Group.

== Appearance and description ==
The Sloughi's head is long and elegant, with droopy ears, similar in appearance to a shorter, thicker-set Greyhound. The body and legs show a defined bone structure supporting strong, lean muscles. The topline is, essentially, horizontal and blends into a gently sloping croup. The tail is long and carried low, like many sighthounds, with an upward curve at the end.

Despite their physical and superficial similarities, the Sloughi should not be confused with other sighthounds originating from North Africa, the Mediterranean or South Asia, such as the Ibizan Hound, the Saluki, or the aforementioned Greyhound, nor with the more distantly-originating Afghan Hound or the Russian Borzoi. However, much in the same vein as these related breeds, the Sloughi was traditionally bred for coursing and to pursue such game as hare, fox, jackals, gazelle and other antelope, deer, or terrestrial birds (such as sand grouse), among other small or mid-sized animals.

The Sloughi is an ancient breed, treasured in North Africa for its natural prey drive, coursing skills, speed, agility, and endurance over long distances. It is a robust, yet elegant and racy, sighthound with evenly proportioned limbs, back and tail. Like most other sighthounds, the Sloughi will adapt quite well to arid locations, its innate "drought-tolerance" adding to its overall value. Likewise, Sloughi are not bred to be fragile or timid dogs. Their overall persona is one of nobility, but somewhat aloof, with a regal air of "class"; the expression of the dark eyes is gentle, thoughtful, and melancholy. In places where they are still used as coursing sighthounds, their appearances can vary by locality, based on breeding situations, hybridisation and unique climatic or environmental adaptations.

== Temperament ==
The Sloughi is a primitive hunting breed that bonds extremely closely with its owner or family from an early age. They are unlikely to be exceedingly shy or aggressive. A well bred and well socialized Sloughi is a stable, attentive, and exceedingly loving family member.

The American Sloughi Association standard states that, “The Sloughi is a dog with class and grace. The attitude is noble and somewhat aloof.”

Because of their origins as the hunters and guardians of Sahara nomads and bedouins, the Sloughi is reserved with strangers and takes a while to warm up to new friends. The Sloughi also expects reserve from people they meet, and may not appreciate those who are too familiar. The Sloughi is also noted for its primitive instincts, for unlike other sighthound breeds it is highly alert and territorial which made them prized by the Berbers, not only as hunters, but as fearless watch dogs.

Improperly socialized Sloughis can be shy and or aggressive towards other dogs, and it is critical that breeders consider temperament in their breeding decisions and that puppies receive appropriate socialization from an early age so that they mature into well adjusted adults. Their socialization must include not only new people, but new situations, environments and other dogs.

Sloughis that are accustomed to children are excellent with children. As with all breeds, children need to be taught to respect dogs and not to mistreat them.

They require ample daily exercise in order to meet their physical, emotional and mental needs. This is not a breed that is well suited to apartment life without a planned regimen of daily exercise that includes galloping freely.

Sloughis have been bred for millennia to course game and as a result have extremely high prey drive. They can be wonderful with cats, small dogs and other animals if they are introduced at an early age and learn that these other pets are not prey.

The Sloughi's character is also tender and intelligent and they are sensitive to correction. They must be trained with methods that are also intelligent and sensitive. Heavy-handed or corporal training methods are not effective for any breed, but they are especially deleterious to the character of sighthounds.

== Health ==
Only a few genetic conditions have been confirmed in the breed. These include certain autoimmune disorders, such as Addison's disease and irritable bowel syndrome and progressive retinal atrophy. The Sloughi is one of the breeds for whom a genetic test for progressive retinal atrophy has been developed to with a simple blood test. Like all sighthounds, the Sloughi is very sensitive to anesthesia, and can be sensitive to vaccines, worming, and other medications—so these routine treatments should be spaced apart instead of given all at once. The breed tends to enjoy excellent health into old age.

== See also ==
- List of dog breeds
