= American Sighthound Field Association =

The American Sighthound Field Association or ASFA is a non-profit organization committed to sanctioning and providing a framework for the sport of lure coursing in the United States. The organization of ASFA is made up of member clubs which host field trials throughout the United States. The organization has a President, First and Second Vice Presidents, Secretary, Treasurer and Chief Financial Officer. The membership of ASFA is further represented by 10 Regional Directors who are elected to two year terms.

== History ==
The American Sighthound Field Association was started in 1972 by Lyle Gillette and other California sighthound fanciers.
