= Borzoi =

Russian dog breed

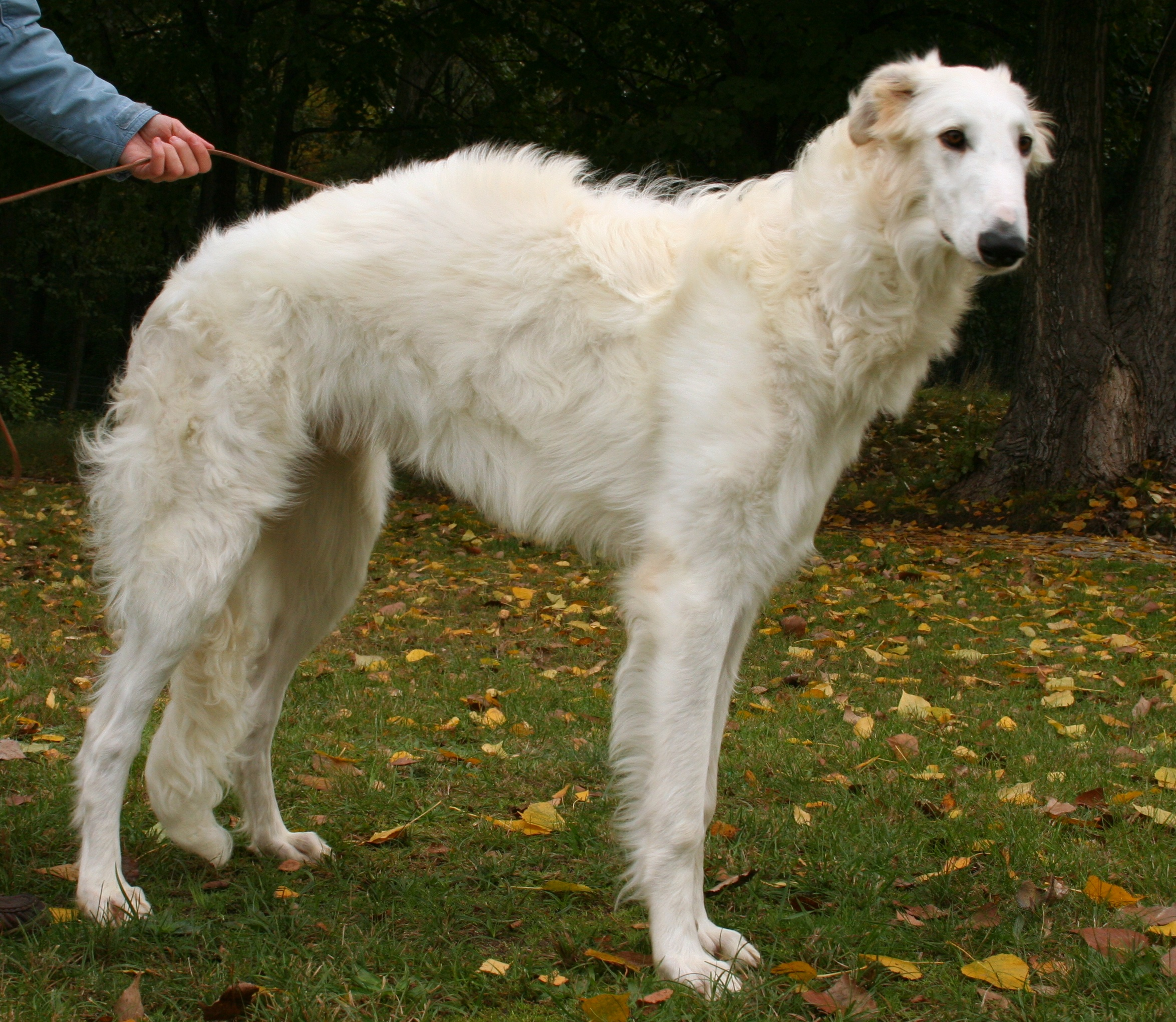
- Other names: Russian Wolfhound; Russian Hunting Sighthound; Russkaya psovaya borzaya
- Origin: Russia
Traits
Height	Males	75–85 cm (30–33 in)
	Females	68–78 cm (27–31 in)
- Weight: 27–48 kg (60–105 lb)
- Coat: medium length, silky and wavy, short length
- Colour: any colour
- Litter size: up to 11
Kennel club standards
- Fédération Cynologique Internationale: standard

The Borzoi (Note: Russian: борзо́й, romanized: borzói [bɐrˈzoj], meaning 'swift' in Russian; English plural either 'Borzoi' or 'Borzois') or Russian Hunting Sighthound (Note: Russian: русская псовая борзая, romanized: russkaya psovaya borzaya, lit. 'Russian long-haired sighthound') is a Russian breed of hunting dog of the sighthound type. It was formerly used for wolf hunting; until 1936, the breed was known as the Russian Wolfhound.

== Etymology ==
Historically, Russian sighthounds were named through descriptive terms as opposed to actual names. Borzoi is the masculine singular form of an archaic Russian adjective for "swift" or "fast". Borzaya sobaka (lit. 'fast dog') is the basic Russian term for sighthounds, though sobaka is usually dropped. In modern Russian, the breed commonly called the Borzoi is officially known as russkaya psovaya borzaya. The name psovaya derived from the word psovina ("wavy, silky coat") just as hortaya means shorthaired (as in hortaya borzaya). Other Russian sighthound breeds are stepnaya borzaya (from the steppe), called stepnoi; and krimskaya borzaya (from the Crimea), called krimskoi.

== History ==
The Borzoi originated in the sixteenth century Russia by crossing Saluki and European sighthounds with thick-coated Russian breeds.

The Borzoi was popular with the Tsars before the 1917 revolution. For centuries, Borzois could not be purchased but only given as gifts from the Tsar. Grand Duke Nicholas Nicolaievich of Russia bred countless Borzoi at Perchino, his private estate.

The Russkaya Psovaya Borzaya was definitively accepted by the Fédération Cynologique Internationale in 1956.

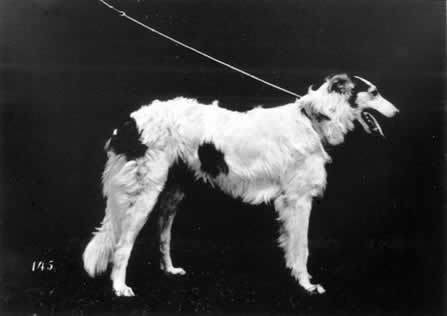
Borzoi owned by Max Hartenstein, Berlin, Germany, 1879

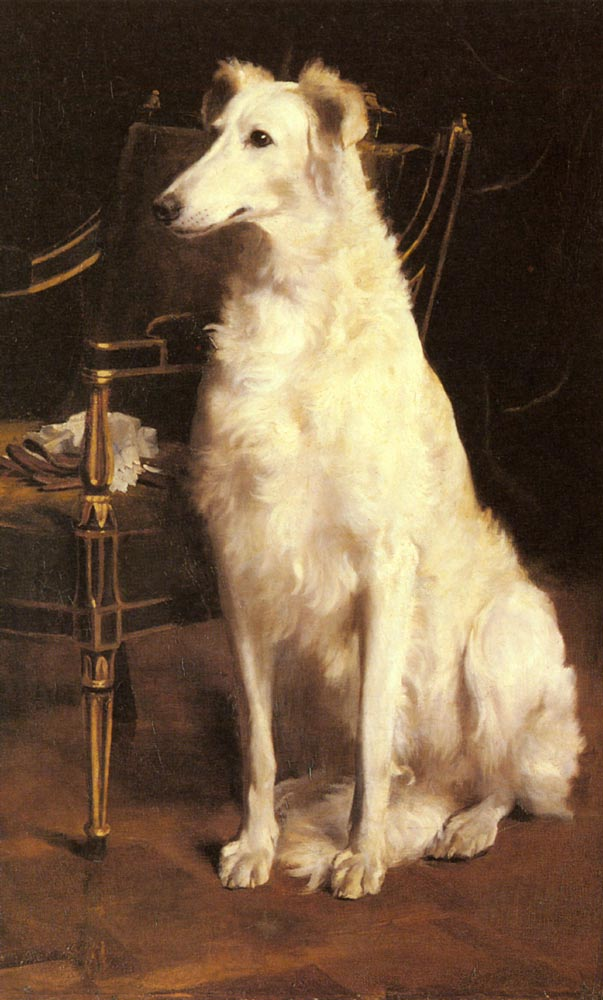
Borzoi by a Chair (St George Hare, 19th century)

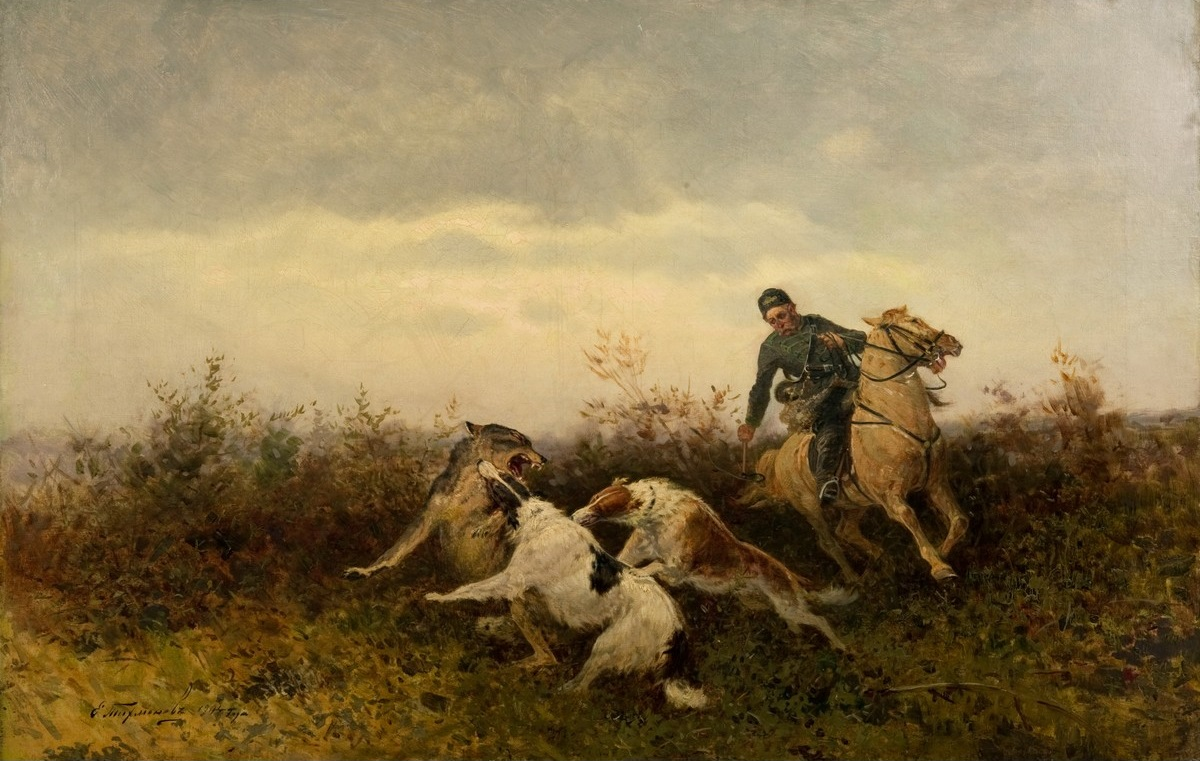
Wolf hunting with borzois (1904), Efim A. Tikhmenev

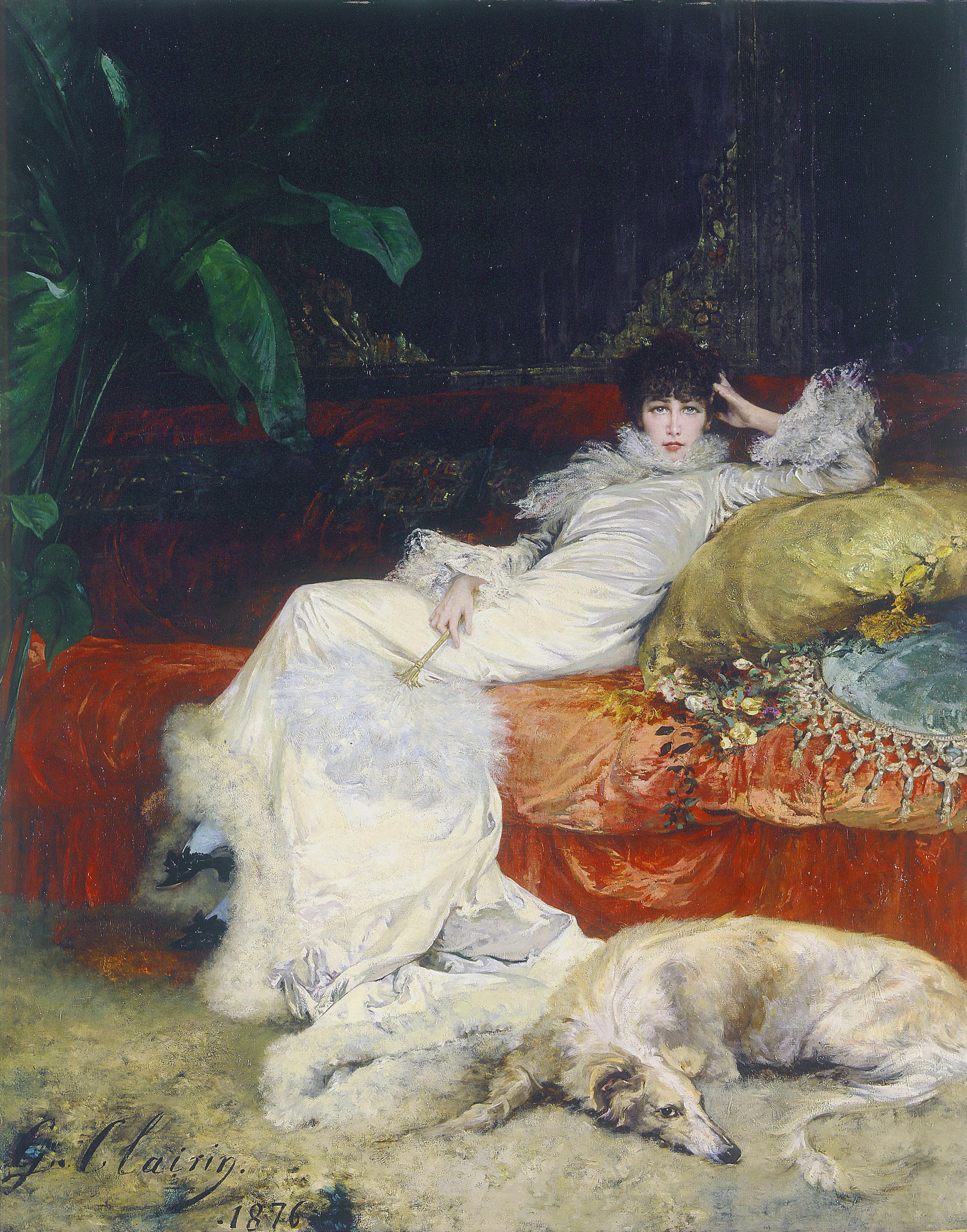
Sarah Bernhardt, portrait by Georges Clairin

== Description ==
=== Appearance ===
Borzois are large Russian sighthounds that resemble some central Asian breeds such as the Afghan Hound, Saluki, and the Kyrgyz Taigan. Borzois come in a variety of colours. The Borzoi coat is silky and flat, often wavy or slightly curly. The long top-coat is quite flat, with varying degrees of waviness or curling. The soft undercoat thickens during winter or in cold climates, but is shed in hot weather to prevent overheating. In its texture and distribution over the body, the Borzoi coat is unique. There should be a frill on its neck, as well as feathering on its hindquarters and tail. Borzois have a uniquely long snout, likely originating from Greyhound ancestry.

=== Temperament ===
The Borzoi is an affectionate and athletic breed of dog with a calm temperament.

In terms of obedience, Borzois are selective learners who quickly become bored with repetitive activity, and they can be difficult to motivate. However, Borzois are capable of enjoying and performing well in competitive obedience and agility trials with sufficient training.

== Coat gallery ==
Coat colours

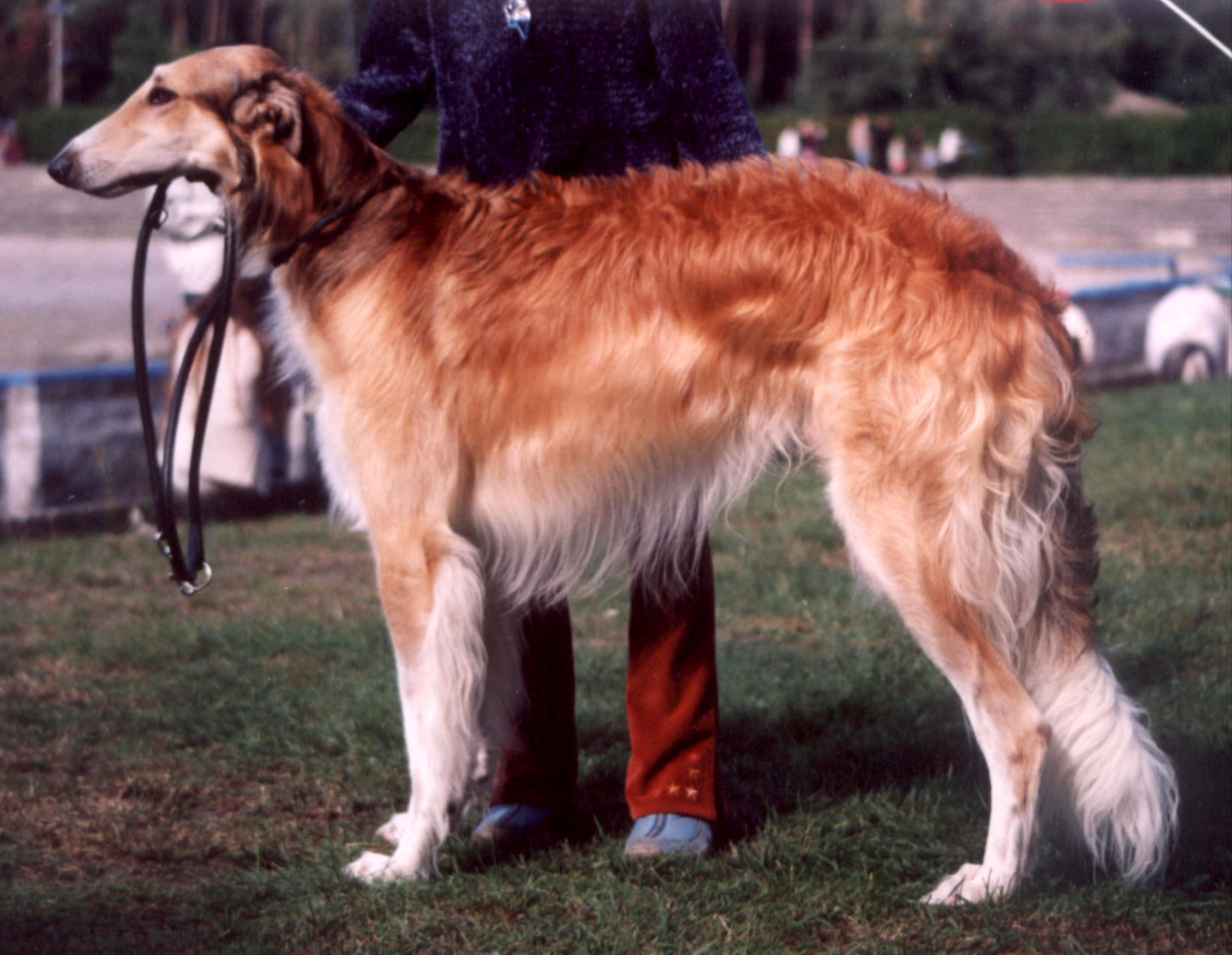
Red

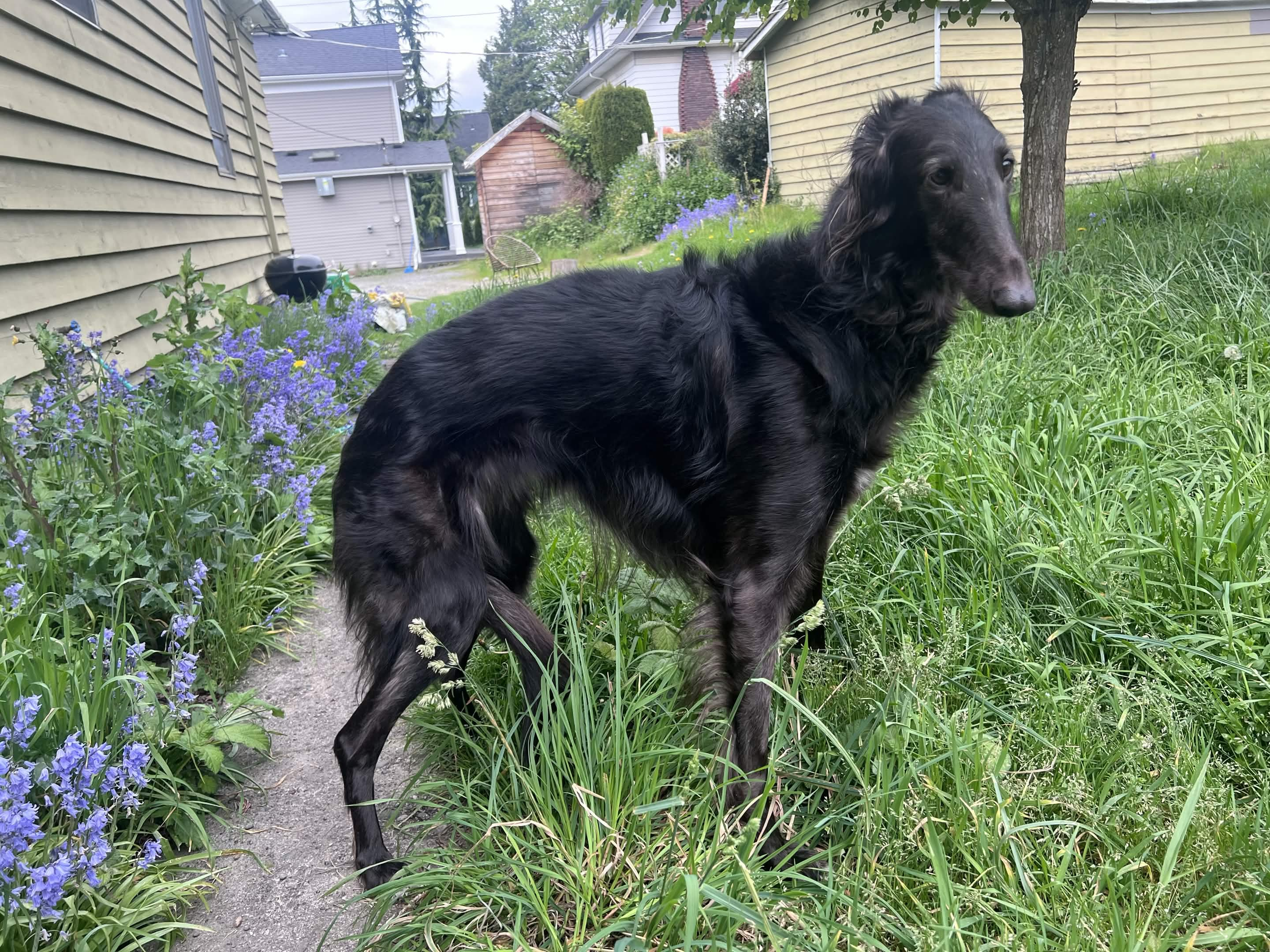
Black

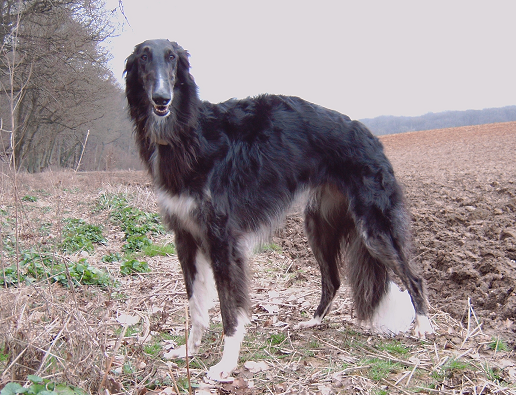
Black (with Irish Spotting)

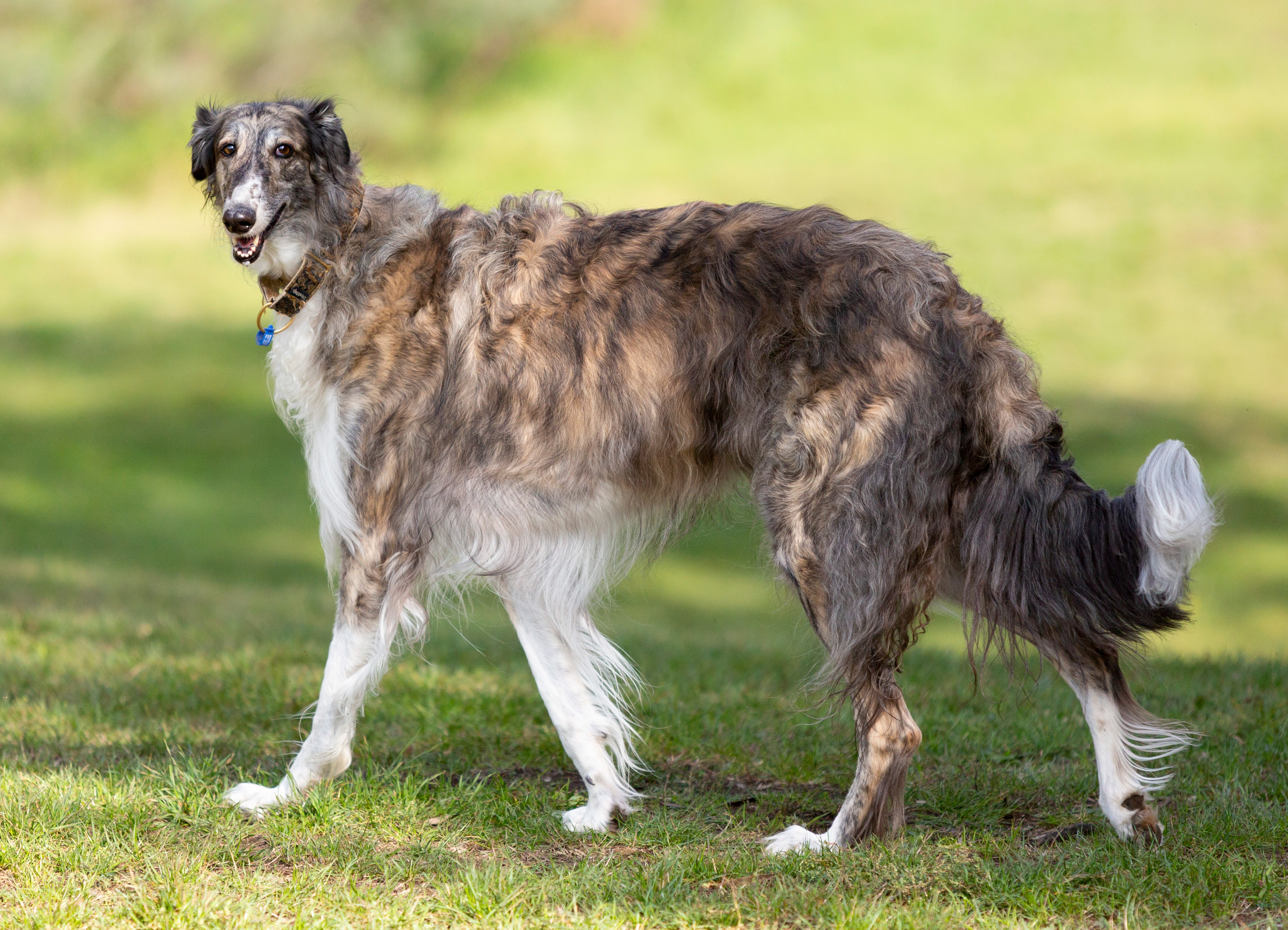
Brindle

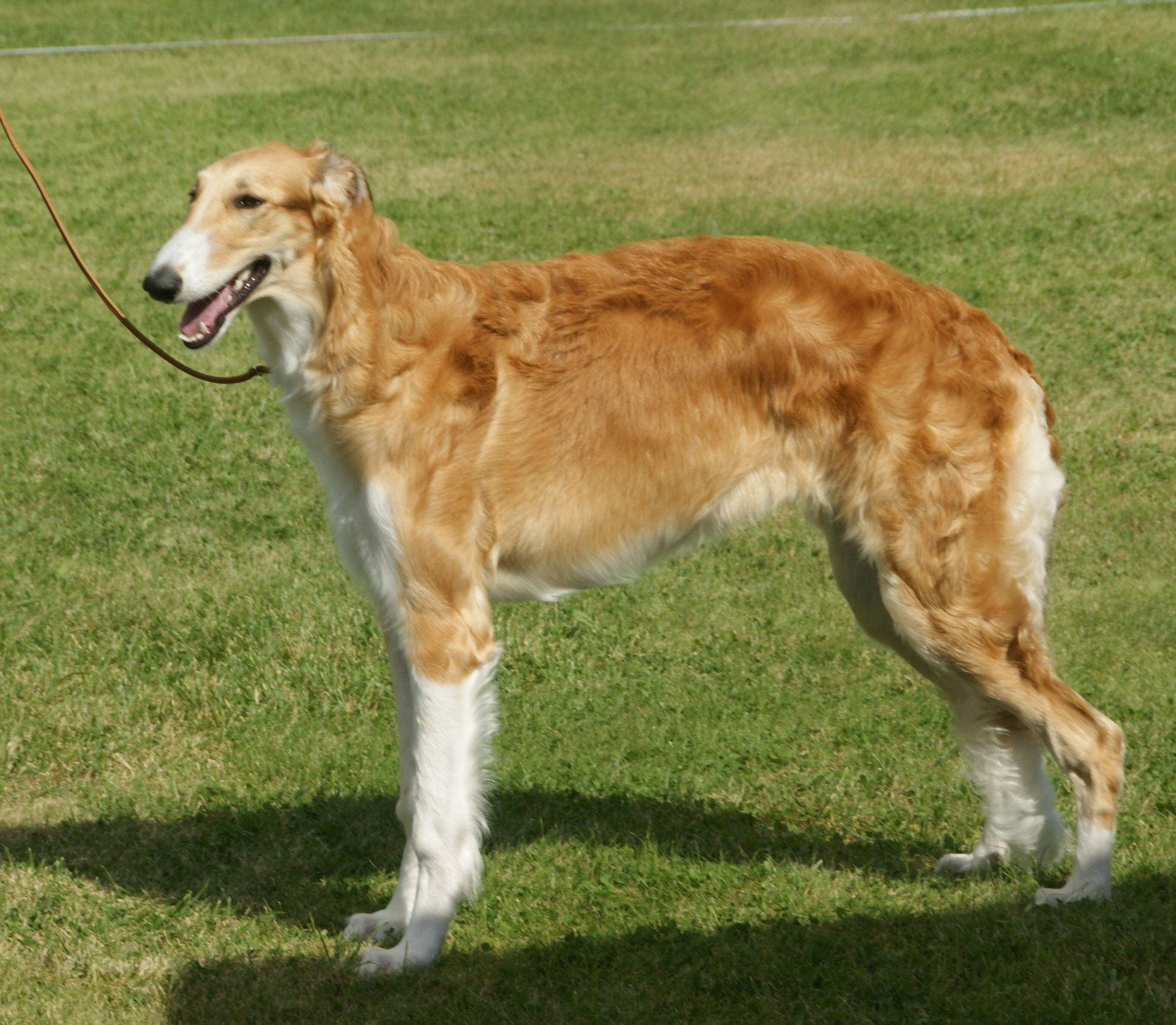
Red and white

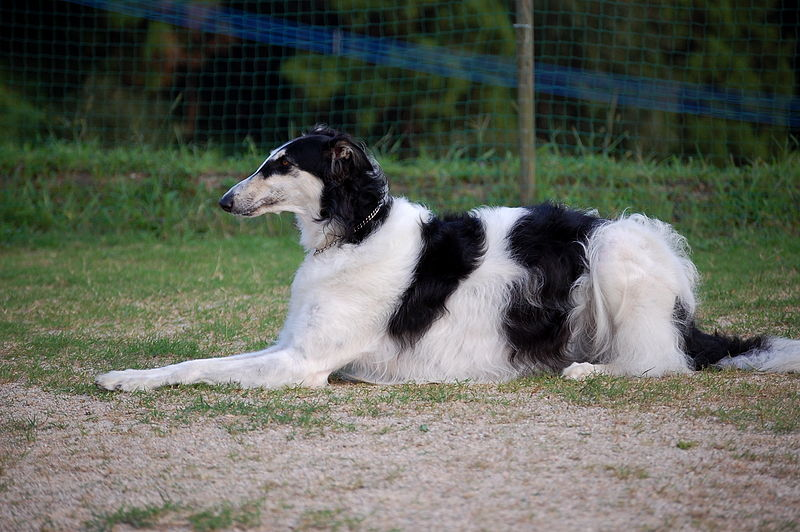
Black and white

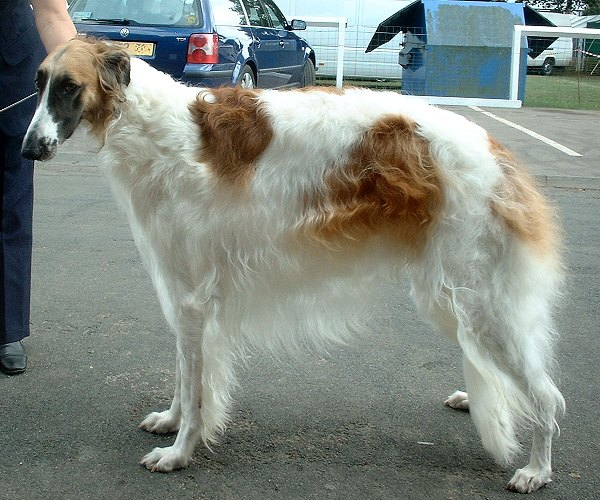
White and brown

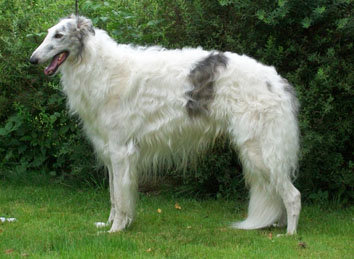
White and grey

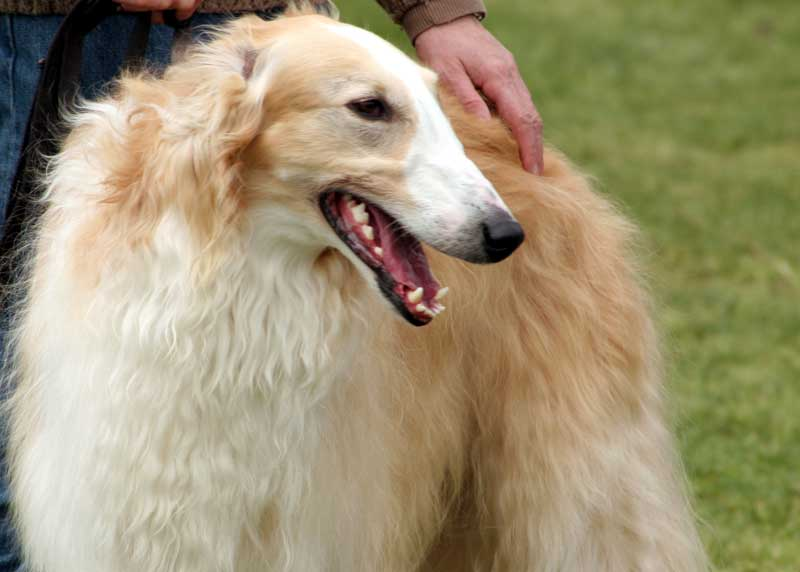
White and sandy

== Health ==
A 2024 UK study found an average life expectancy of 12 years for Borzois, with a sample size of 43, compared to 12.7 for purebreds and 12 for mongrels.

An American study looking at echocardiographs of clinically healthy Borzoi found 53.8% to have heart murmurs, 30.2% to have trace or mild mitral regurgitation, 36.1% to have mild tricuspid regurgitation, and 14.4% to have cardiac disease.

Borzois, along with other sighthounds, recover slower from anaesthesia due to a lower volume of distribution and their lean muscle mass and low body-fat percentage.

Due to their anatomy, Borzois, like other large breeds, have a predisposition to developing gastric dilatation volvulus (GDV). A 2020 study identified an association between GDV in Borzois and RNA Binding Motif Protein 26 (RBM26), although of unknown significance.
