= Macedonian Shepherd Dog =

Macedonian Karaman
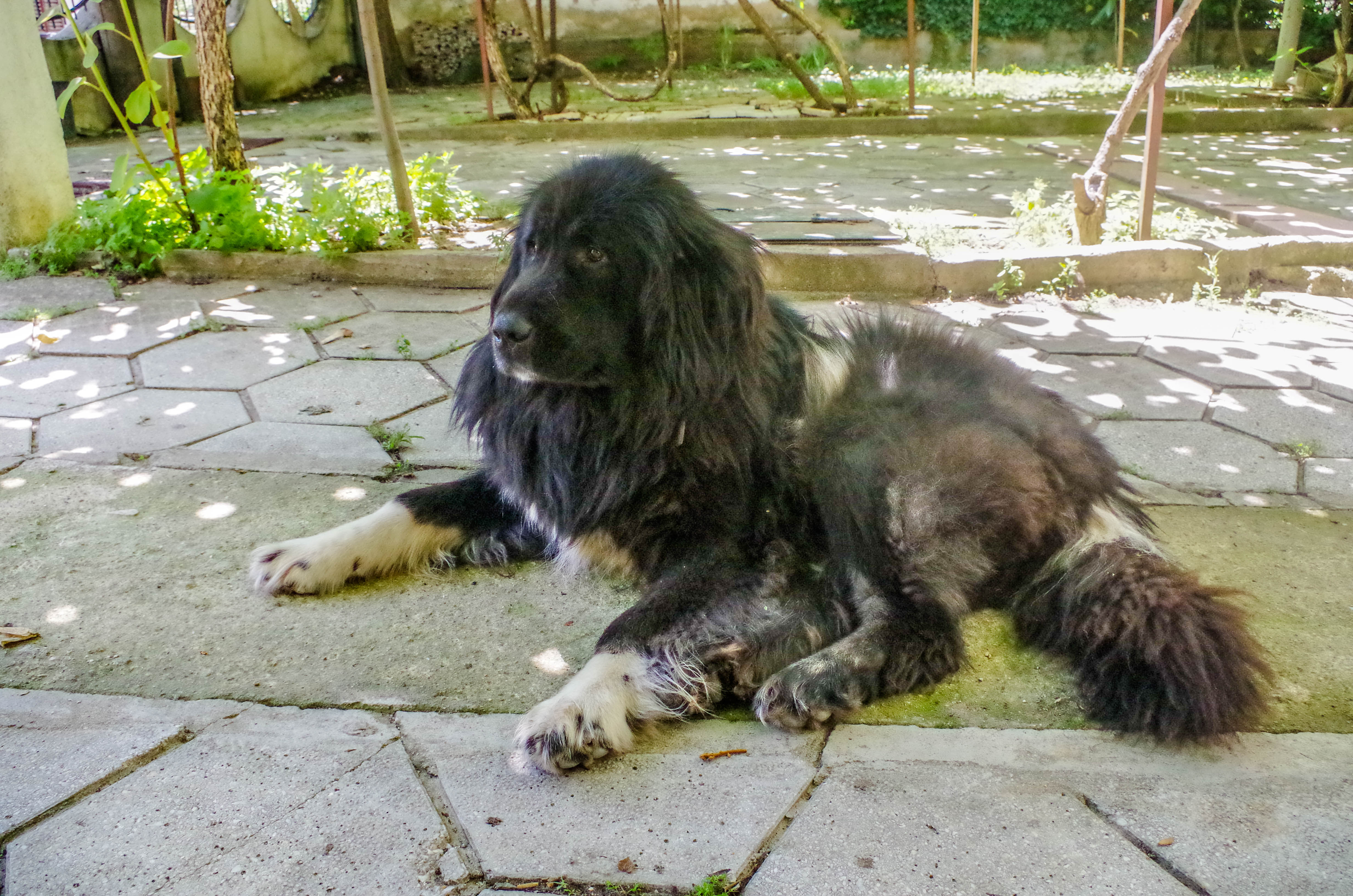
- A typical Macedonian Karaman shepherd dog
- Other names: Macedonian Shepherd Dog – Karaman; Karaman; Black Panther; Macedonian Karaman Shepherd
- Origin: North Macedonia
- Distribution: Balkans
Traits
Height	Males	65–68 cm (26–27 in) (+/- 2 cm tolerance)
	Females	62–66 cm (24–26 in) (+/- 2 cm tolerance)
Weight	Males	40–45 kg (88–99 lb)
	Females	37–42 kg (82–93 lb)
- Coat: Double; thick, coarse (approx. 9.5 cm at withers), and weather-resistant
- Colour: Solid black; small white markings on the chest or toes are permitted
- Litter size: 5–10 puppies
Kennel club standards
- Kennel Association of the Republic of North Macedonia (KSM): standard
- Fédération Cynologique Internationale: standard

Macedonian Shepherd Dog or Karaman is a traditional shepherd dog breed originating from North Macedonia. Known for its striking black coat and imposing stature, the Karaman has been used for centuries by Macedonian shepherds to protect livestock from large predators such as wolves and bears in the Balkan mountains.

== History ==
The Macedonian Karaman is one of the oldest indigenous dog breeds in the Balkan Peninsula. Its name is derived from the Turkish word karaman, meaning "black" or "dark-skinned", reflecting its characteristic coal-black coat.

Historically, the breed was selectively bred by nomadic and mountain shepherds for its fearlessness, loyalty, and ability to survive the harsh climates of the Macedonian mountains. Unlike the Šarplaninac, which is often grey, the Macedonian Karaman was specifically bred for its black color, which allowed it to blend into the shadows at night while guarding the flock, providing a tactical advantage against predators.

== Characteristics ==
=== Appearance ===
The Macedonian Karaman is a large, powerful, and well-muscled dog, possessing a massive head with a broad skull and a strong muzzle. Its eyes are almond-shaped and vary in color from dark brown to amber. The breed is defined by a dense double coat; the outer layer is long and coarse to repel the elements, while the undercoat is thick and fine to provide insulation against snow and rain. The hallmark of the breed is its solid black coloration. While small white patches on the chest or toes are considered acceptable within the breed standard, a pure coal-black coat remains the preferred aesthetic for traditional breeders.

=== Temperament ===
The Macedonian Karaman is characterized by its high intelligence and independent nature, traits developed through centuries of making autonomous decisions while guarding flocks in remote terrain. The breed is deeply loyal and devoted to its owner and immediate family, though it remains naturally suspicious and reserved around strangers. It possesses a formidable guarding instinct and demonstrates extreme bravery when defending its territory or livestock against threats. Unlike many domestic breeds, the Macedonian Karaman is not prone to unnecessary aggression but will not hesitate to react if it perceives a genuine danger to its flock.

== Conservation and recognition ==
Efforts to preserve the Karaman as a distinct breed reached a major milestone on 11 February 2026, when the Fédération Cynologique Internationale (FCI) officially accepted the breed on a provisional basis under the name Macedonian Shepherd Dog – Karaman (FCI Standard No. 378). This recognition followed a long-term standardization process led by the Kennel Association of the Republic of North Macedonia (KSM). The breed is protected as a national treasure and remains a vital part of the country's cultural and natural heritage.

== See also ==
- Šarplaninac
- Greek Shepherd
- Bulgarian Shepherd Dog
