= Zing Tsjeng =

Singaporean journalist, author, and podcaster (born 1988)

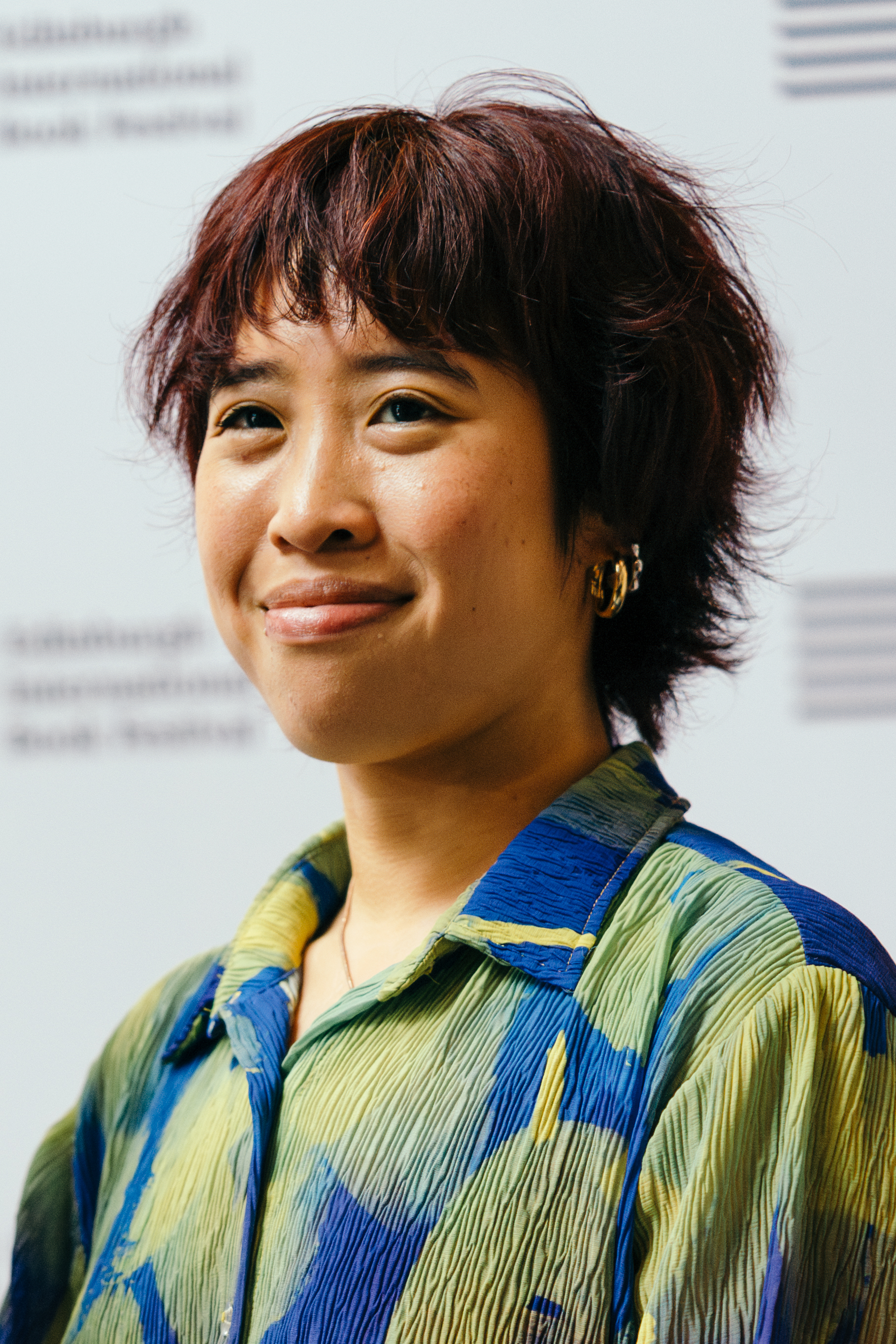
- Tsjeng at the 2025 Edinburgh International Book Festival
- Born: 25 September 1988 (age 37); Singapore
- Education: Emmanuel College, Cambridge (BA); City, University of London (MA)
- Occupations: Editor, journalist, author, podcaster
- Employer: Vice UK

Zing Tsjeng (born 25 September 1988) is a Singaporean journalist, non-fiction author, and podcaster based in London. She was previously the editor in chief of Vice UK and Vice.com. She launched Broadly for the network in 2014.

Tsjeng published her four-installment book series Forgotten Women, profiling underrated historical women in various fields, in 2018 under Octopus Publishing.

In addition to Vice, Tsjeng has contributed to publications such as British Vogue, The Guardian, Dazed, Refinery29, AnOther, Harper's Bazaar UK, and Time Out London. She is a founder of the anti-harassment Unfollow Me campaign.

== Early life and education ==
Tsjeng was born in Singapore. She moved to London at 16. Initially enrolled at Cheltenham Ladies' College, she later graduated with a Bachelor of Arts in Social and Political Sciences from Emmanuel College, Cambridge in 2010. She developed an interest in journalism through the Cambridge student newspaper and interned at The Guardian and Diva, later becoming an editor at the latter. She went on to graduate with a Master of Arts in Magazine Journalism from City, University of London in 2012.

== Broadcasting ==
=== Presenting work ===
- Empires of Dirt video series for VICE World News
- My First Time sex and dating podcast for VICE
- United Zingdom for BBC Sounds
- Obsessed with Killing Eve for BBC Sounds and BBC Three
- Good Bad Billionaire for BBC Sounds

== Personal life ==
Tsjeng is technically eligible to apply for British citizenship. Singapore, her country of birth, does not currently permit or recognise dual nationality, a topic Tsjeng covers in her BBC Sounds podcast United Zingdom. She is bisexual. Tsjeng is the joint owner, with her partner, of a kokoni spaniel cross named Judy who appeared on the cover of Time Out London magazine alongside UK Drag Race star Bimini Bom-Boulash in 2021.

In March 2023, Tsjeng appeared as one of the guests on BBC Question Time and in June and November of the same year, she appeared on Have I Got News For You.

== Awards and recognition ==
- Named one of London's most influential people in the Evening Standard Progress List 1000
- An LGBTQ trailblazer in Attitude magazine's Attitude 101 list
- Highly commended in the British Journalism Awards 2020

== Bibliography ==
=== Forgotten Women (2018) ===
- Forgotten Women: The Scientists
- Forgotten Women: The Leaders
- Forgotten Women: The Writers
- Forgotten Women: The Artists

=== Essays ===
- In the Garden: Essays on Nature and Growing (2021)
