= Karkachan =

Karkachan may refer to:

- The Karakachan dog a livestock guarding dog from Bulgaria
- The Karakachans a redirect from the ethnic group Sarakatsani
