= Rastreador Brasileiro =

Rastreador Brasileiro Brazilian Tracker
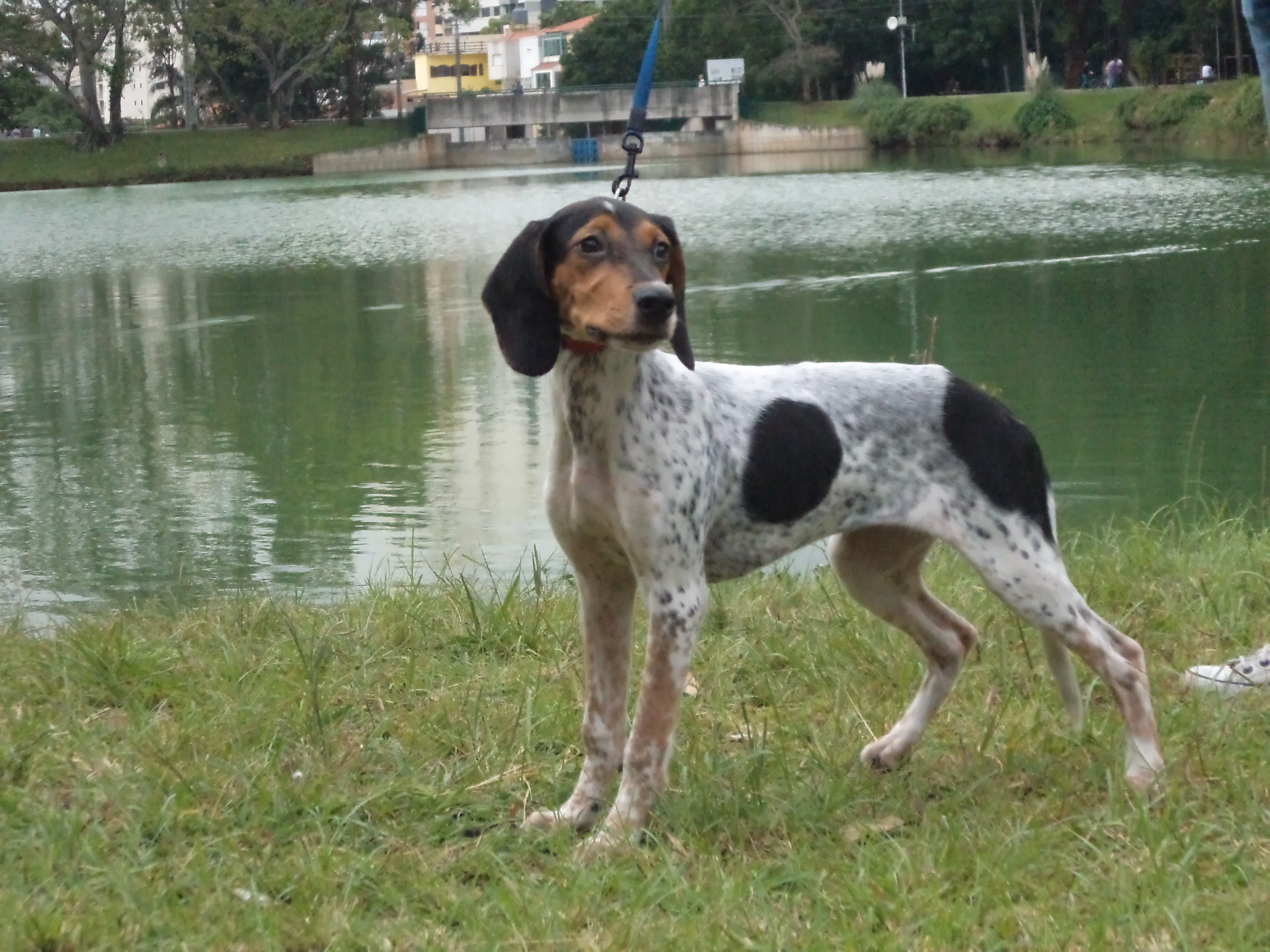
- Other names: Urrador; Urrador Americano
- Origin: Brazil
Traits
Height	Males	60–65 cm (24–26 in)
	Females	56–63 cm (22–25 in)
Weight	Males	26–33 kg (57–73 lb)
	Females	21–30 kg (46–66 lb)
- Coat: short, smooth
- Colour: blue roan/speckled, black & tan, white and brown, white and black, tricolour
Kennel club standards
- CBKC: standard
- Fédération Cynologique Internationale: standard

The Rastreador Brasileiro (English: Brazilian Tracker) is a mid- to large-sized breed of dog—specifically a scent hound—from Brazil, also known by the names Urrador (for its signature baying and howl when hunting) or Urrador Americano, a reference to the North American (U.S.) coonhound in the breed's bloodlines and genealogy. First recognised by the Fédération Cynologique Internationale (FCI) in 1967, by 1973, an outbreak of disease and an overdose of insecticides, effectively eliminated the breed's entire population; both the FCI and the Confederação Brasileira de Cinofilia (CBC), Brazil's kennel club organization, declared the breed extinct that year and de-listed it. However, efforts were made to reproduce the Rastreador Brasileiro through mixing and controlled breeding projects involving several other hound breeds, resulting in today's Rastreador Brasileiro. In 2013, the Brazilian Kennel Club (CBKC) officially re-recognized the breed. An updated FCI breed standard was produced in 2019.

== Appearance ==
The Rastreador Brasileiro has a short, smooth coat. The colour options are:

- bluish colour: white background with blue spots/speckles; either with or without tan legs
- black and tan: black ground colour with tan markings
- bicolour: white background with either brown or black spots
- tricolour: white background with black and brown markings/spots

The breed standard from 1970 shows the size as being 62 to 67 cm (24.4 to 26.4 ins) at the withers, and the general appearance as being generally similar to an American coonhound. However, the current official Brazilian breed standard mentions the height of males being 60 to 65 cm and the height of females being 56 to 63 cm.

== Re-creation ==
The Grupo de Apoio ao Resgate do Rastreador Brasileiro in Brazil, a club dedicated to the Brazilian restoration of the breed, lists as an objective the finding of 40 breeding animals of the correct type that can be certified as members of the breed, so as to eventually be once again recognised by the Brazilian Kennel Club.

Restoration of the breed is difficult due to the existence of very few dogs of the correct type and the lack of people interested in recovering the true Brazilian cultural and genetic heritage of the breed.

== See also ==
- List of dog breeds
- Coonhound
- Foxhound
- Preservation breeding
