= Halden Hound =

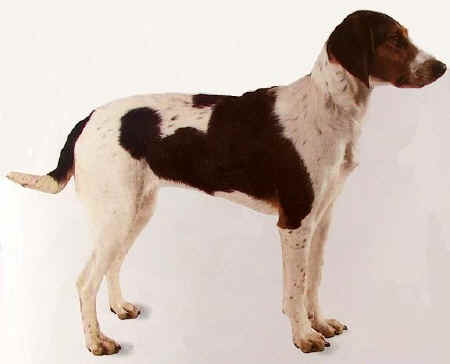
- Other names: Haldenstøver
- Origin: Norway
Kennel club standards
- Fédération Cynologique Internationale: standard

The Halden Hound (Norwegian: Haldenstøver), is a medium-sized Norwegian dog breed of the hound class, used for hunting hares and other plains quarry. It resembles an American Foxhound but is smaller. It was named after Halden, a town in southeastern Norway.

== Description ==
=== Appearance ===
The Halden is similar to the American Foxhound in appearance although it is smaller. Haldens stand between 43 and 54 centimeters at the shoulder, and weigh approximately 18-24 kg. They have smooth, very dense coats, hanging ears, and are white with black patches as well as brown shading on the head and legs. They are strong dogs with rectangular bodies and straight, solid backs. The tail is fairly thick, carried low, and hangs down toward the hocks. The skull is slightly domed with a pronounced stop and a straight nosebridge. The cheeks are flat. The ears are pendulous and curled, and the eyes are dark brown and kind. The nose is black. Breeders of Haldens aim for a particular foot shape, with high, tight, long toes and dense fur, for greater stability and warmth as the terrain they hunt through is often snowy and difficult to navigate.

=== Temperament ===
The Halden is a loving and an affectionate pet as well as a good hunting breed. They are said to be good family dogs and to behave well with children. Haldens are hardy and energetic, able to bear cold weather and maintain a quick pace for extended periods. They do best in homes with large areas to play or owners who provide extensive exercise. Prolonged periods of inactivity can cause them to become restless and unhappy. The Halden does not hunt in packs, as many hounds do. They are bred to hunt alone with their owner.

== Health ==
The Halden is a healthy breed, with no known health problems. They have an average lifespan of 12 years.

== History ==
The Halden is one of three Norwegian hare hound breeds, and is the smallest in size. Bred for scent hunting, the breed is believed to have been developed through crossing local Norwegian scenthounds with scenthounds from Sweden, Germany, and England. It was first developed in the early 1900s, and the breed standard was established in the 1950s. The Halden is relatively rare, seldom seen outside Norway.

== See also ==
- List of dog breeds
