= Portuguese Sheepdog =

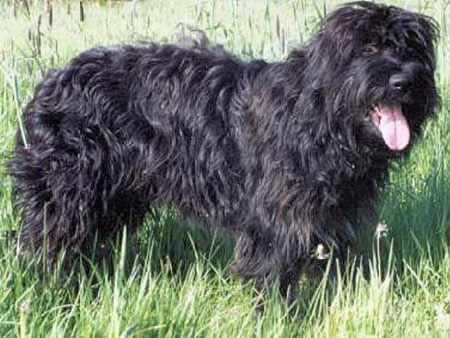
- Other names: Cão da Serra de Aires
- Common nicknames: Cão macaco ('Monkey dog')
- Origin: Portugal
Kennel club standards
- Fédération Cynologique Internationale: standard

The Portuguese Sheepdog (Portuguese: cão da Serra de Aires, literally 'dog of Serra de Aires') is a medium-sized breed of dog of the herding dog type, and is one of the indigenous regional dogs of Portugal. The Portuguese name refers to Serra de Aires, a mountain near Montforte in the Alentejo region (sometimes mistaken for the Serra d'Aire, a range of hills or mountains marking the boundary between Ribatejo and Oeste, north of the Tagus river). The breed is nicknamed cão macaco ('macaque dog', 'monkey dog') for its furry face and lively attitude.

== Appearance ==
Portuguese Sheepdog is a medium-sized dog, standing 45 to 55 cm (17½ to 21½ ins) at the withers for males (females slightly smaller) and 17 to 27 kg (37 to 60 lbs) in weight. The dog's body is long and has a long coat without an undercoat, of medium thickness and described as having a "goat like" texture. The lack of an undercoat makes the dog less resistant to extreme weather as a working dog. Typical coat colours include yellow, chestnut, grey, fawn, wolf grey (Portuguese: fulvo or lobeiro), and black, with tan marks. White hairs may be mixed in with the coat, but there should be no large white patches.

The tail should be long, and a natural bobtail is a disqualification under the breed standard, meaning that owners are discouraged from breeding such non typical dogs, and tailless dogs cannot compete for breed championships. The tail should never be docked. The drop (hanging) ears are set high and close to the head. Detailed descriptions of all of the ideal proportions and colours are listed in the original breed standard, as well as faults which are aspects not typical for the breed or that are structural problems.

== History ==
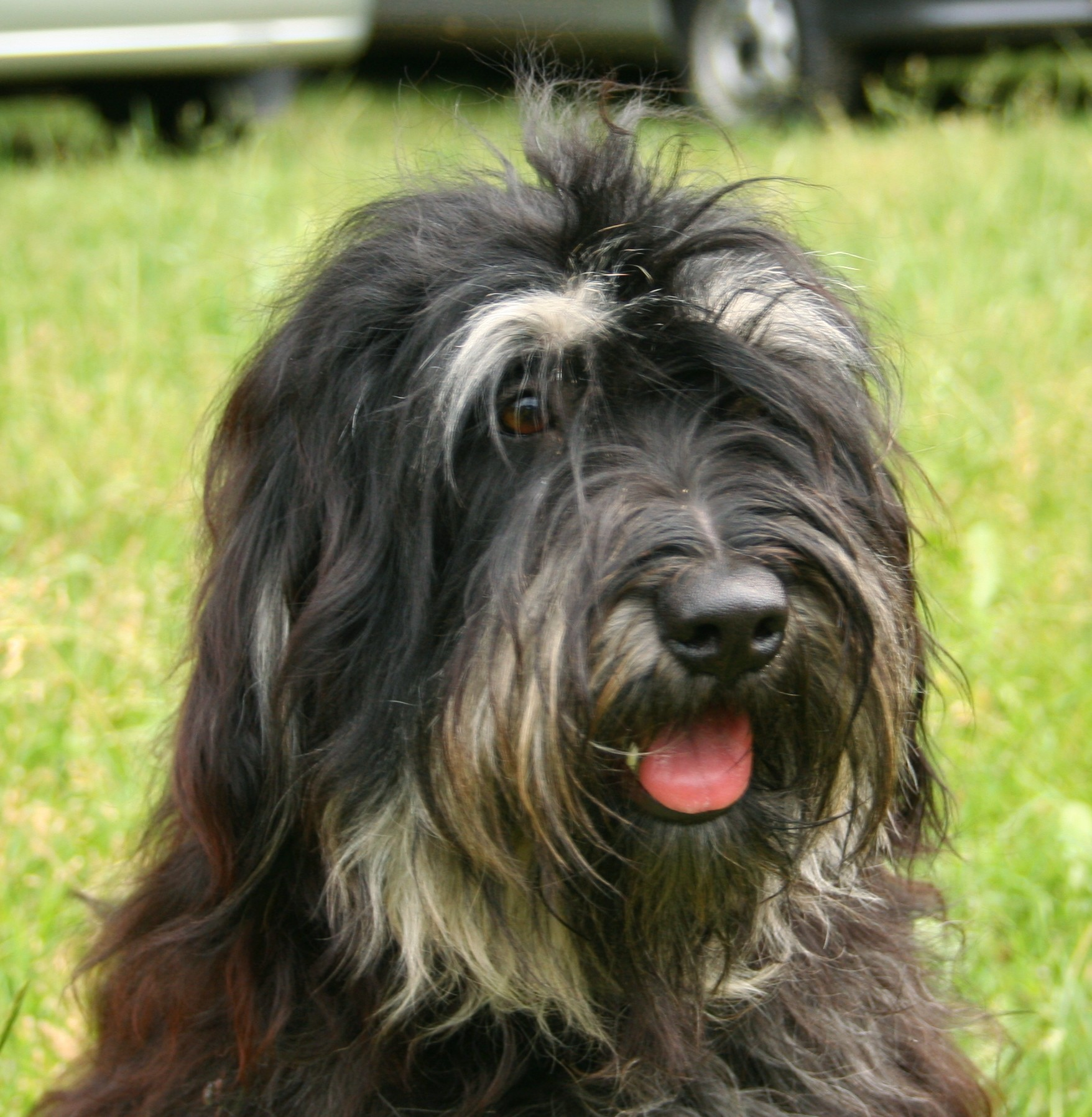
Head of a Cão da Serra de Aires living in Poland

Ancestors of the modern breed were traditionally used for herding cows, sheep, goats, horses, and even pigs in the Serra de Aires and in the Alentejo. As with other breeds who came from undocumented, working dog origins, "... data is rare, or does not exist ... most guardian and herding breeds do not have records before 1900". The dog is recognisable as one of the old-fashioned types of European sheepdogs, believed to be closely related to the Pyrenean and Catalan Sheepdogs. It is also believed to be descended from Briards imported into Portugal in the early 1900s by the Conde de Castro Guimarães from Cascais, and crossed with the Pyrenean Sheepdog. The landscape of the Serra de Aires is barren and harsh and it has been noted that the breed would have had a difficult time adapting to the climate there.

The first breed standard was written by Antonio Cabral and Felipe Morgado Romeiros and was accepted by the Portuguese Kennel Club. The breed was recognised internationally in 1996 by the Fédération Cynologique Internationale, under the name Portuguese Sheepdog in English. The breed has been exported to other countries, and has become a popular companion and pet in Europe. In the United States, the breed is recognised by the United Kennel Club in its Herding group as of 2006, also under the name Portuguese Sheepdog. It is also recognised and listed under its original name or various translations by minor kennel clubs, specialty clubs, and Internet dog registry businesses, and is promoted as a rare breed for those seeking an unusual pet.

== Related Portuguese breeds ==
The Portuguese Sheepdog is a regional herding breed, and in other areas of the country the Saint Miguel Cattle Dog, Estrela Mountain Dog, Castro Laboreiro Dog and Rafeiro do Alentejo traditionally did similar work herding livestock in other mountain areas of the country. Nowadays, most of them are kept as pets.

== Health ==
No recurring health problems or claims of extraordinary health have been documented for this breed. They are prone to ehrlichiosis transmitted by ticks. Abdominal tumors are to be expected on senior dogs, so regular echograms are advised after the eighth year of life.

=== Temperament ===
The FCI breed standard states that the ideal Portuguese Sheepdog is "exceptionally intelligent and very lively."

=== Activities ===
Portuguese Sheepdogs can compete in dog agility trials, obedience, showmanship, flyball, tracking, and herding events. Herding instincts and trainability can be measured at noncompetitive herding tests. Portuguese Sheepdogs exhibiting basic herding instincts can be trained to compete in herding trials.

== See also ==
- List of dog breeds
- Santo Aleixo, Monforte
