= Ariège Pointer =

French breed of dog

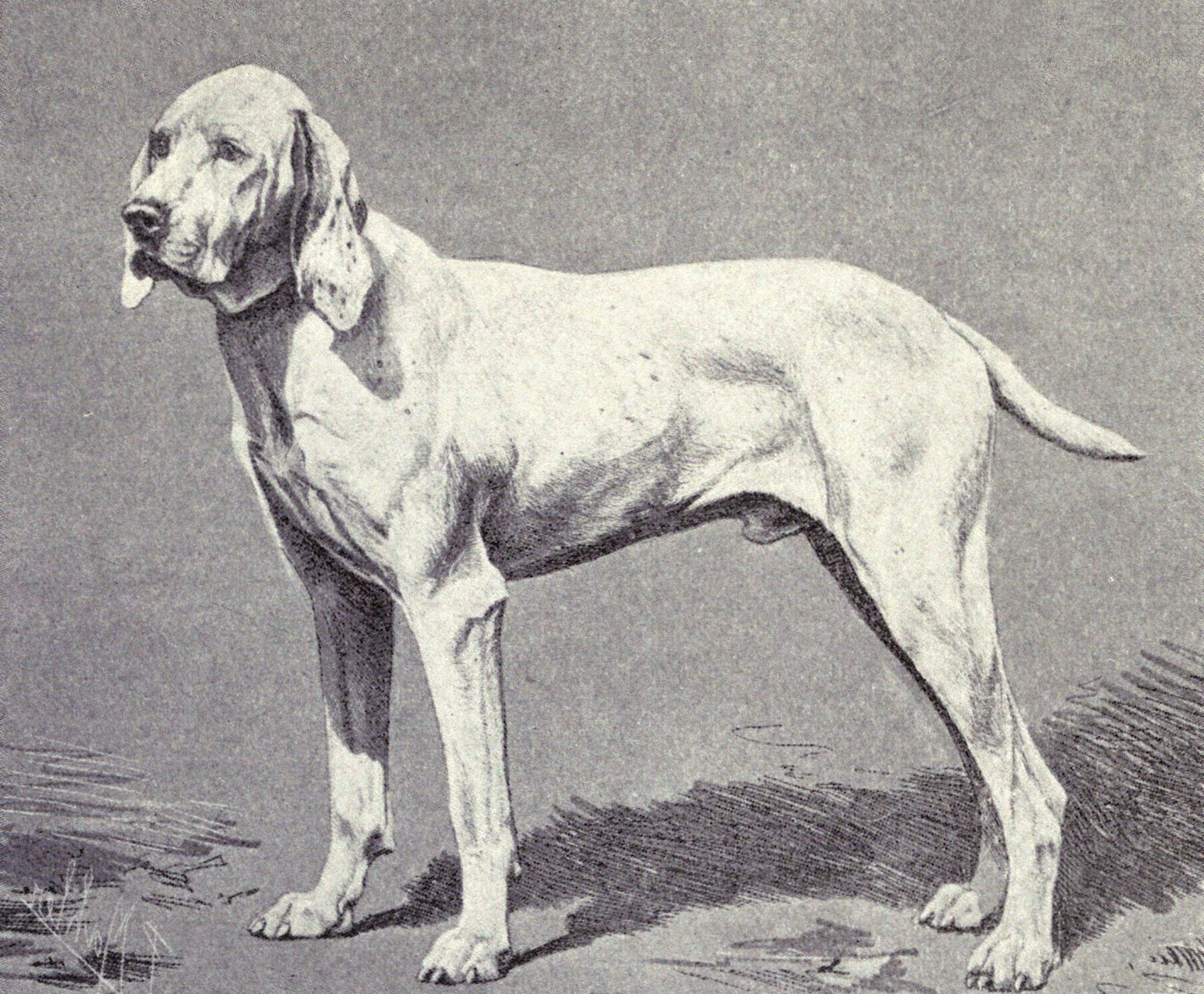
- Pointer of Ariège circa 1915
- Other names: Braque de l'Ariège
- Origin: France
Traits
Height	Males	60–67 cm (24–26 in)
	Females	56–65 cm (22–26 in)
Kennel club standards
- Société Centrale Canine: standard
- Fédération Cynologique Internationale: standard

The Ariège Pointer is a French breed of hunting dog of pointer type. It originates in the Ariège département of Occitanie, in south-western France. The breed name may be rendered in English as Ariège Pointing Dog or Braque de l'Ariège.

== Overview ==
The dog type used by hunters in the Ariège département of Occitanie was said to be descended from dogs that were crosses of the Perdiguero de Burgos and the Bracco Italiano.

The population decreased over World War I and II, and in 1990 a team of breeders decided to devote themselves to the Braque de l'Ariège's survival, in particular Alain Deteix. He headed that team of breeders and devoted himself to the revival of the breed.

It is well suited to hunting wild hare and partridge.

== Appearance ==
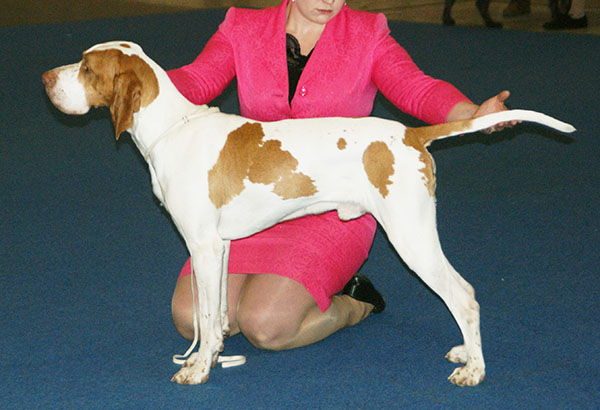
Ariège Pointer

The Braque de l'Ariège is a normally proportioned dog with drop ears. The tail is traditionally docked. The coat is short and primarily white, speckled with larger patches of colours described as orange, liver, or chestnut on the head and ears. Size is about 60–67 centimetres (24–26 in) in height at the withers. Dogs of the breed should appear powerful but without excessive heaviness, robust and of strong. It is quick, energetic, and very independent, and so needs regular training and activity.

== See also ==
- List of dog breeds
