= Karakachan dog =

Bulgarian dog breed

Karakachan Dog
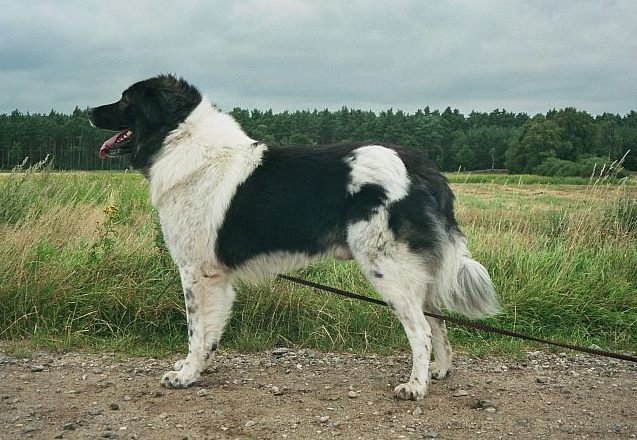
- Karakachan Dog
- Other names: Karakachan
- Origin: Bulgaria
Kennel club standards
- BRFK: standard

The Karakachan dog is a breed that originated from Bulgaria. It is related to the livestock guardian dogs of the surrounding countries: Romania to the north, North Macedonia and Serbia to the west, and Greece, and Turkey to the south. The dog is named after the Karakachans, Greek nomadic shepherds. Due to their conservative stock-breeding traditions, they have preserved some of the oldest breeds of domestic animals in Europe: the Karakachan sheep, Karakachan horse and the Karakachan dog.

This dog was used as a livestock guardian prized for its intelligence and fearless nature. It is known as the "wolf killer". The Karakachan dog was also later used in Bulgaria as a border army watchdog. The breed was almost extinguished, and was only preserved through the fierce protection and dedication of the Bulgarian shepherds in the mountain regions. Nowadays it is used primarily as a livestock guardian dog and property guard dog. The most numerous populations of working purebred livestock guarding Karakachan dogs are found in Bulgaria and the United States. The Karakachan was officially recognised as a Bulgarian native breed in 2005. They are part of the origin of the Bulgarian Shepherd, but should not be confused as the same breed.

== History ==
The Karakachan dog is a typical livestock guardian dog, created for guarding its owner's flock and property; it does not hesitate to fight wolves or bears to defend its owner and his family in case of danger. Its ancestors started forming as early as the third millennium BC. The Karakachan dog is a descendant of the dogs of the Thracians, renowned as stock-breeders. The dog is named after the Karakachans. Due to their conservative stock-breeding traditions, they managed to preserve some of the oldest breeds of domestic animals in Europe – the Karakachan sheep, the Karakachan horse, and, of course, the Karakachan dog. It is with this name that the Karakachan dog appears in the works of some of the classics of Bulgarian literature, namely Yordan Yovkov, Georgi Raitchev and Yordan Radichkov. In 1938 H. B. Peters wrote about it in the German cynological magazine, "Zeitschrift für Hundeforschung". The first researcher of the breed was Todor Gajtandjiev, who proposed the standardization of the breed in the 1970s.

== Etymology ==
The word karakachan is most likely derived from Turkish kara ('black') and kaçan ('one that got away'). The Karakachans (as they are called in Bulgaria), Sărăceni (as they are called in Romania), or Sarakatsani (as they call themselves) are a population of ethnically Greek nomads that have lived throughout the Balkan peninsula, but today have largely assimilated into local populations.

== Breed standard ==
The official breed standard was written in 1991 and approved in 2005 by the State Commission for Animal Breeds within Ministry of Agriculture of Republic of Bulgaria. The breed has Certificate for recognition no. BG 10675 P2. They are registered in the International Karakachan Data Base in Bulgaria. Registrations will show MAKK or IKDA . Only those dogs are of the "true" Karakachan bloodline.

=== Appearance ===
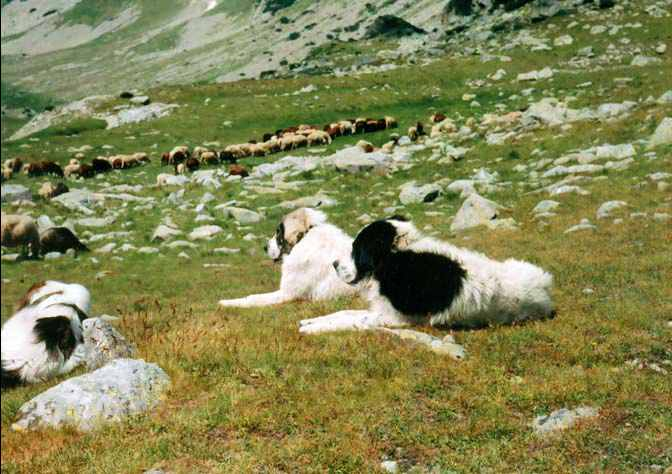
Karakachan dogs guarding the flock

== Effectiveness ==
The Karakachan belongs to the rare livestock protection breeds. The dogs are effective at flock protection against predation and theft. Since 1998, there have been three cases of successful predator attacks in the flocks provided with dogs for this project. In one flock of 650 sheep, four had been killed, but this was due to the shepherds dividing the flock in half during grazing, and one half had been left without dogs.

The Karakachan dog is strictly territorial. It accepts the flock as its territory, wherever it is. Being close to the flock, they become visibly aggressive if the flock is threatened. If a stranger tries to remove an animal from the flock, the dogs will become seriously aggressive. However, when a flock is passing through a village the dogs walk calmly without paying attention to people. There is another reason for the lack of accidents: the tradition of guarding livestock with big, aggressive dogs has always existed in Bulgaria. Everyone knows about them and people simply avoid the flocks, so conflicts do not occur. Also there are dogs, which are not really aggressive towards people, but in the same time are excellent guards against other animal predators. The trends in breeding these dogs are to produce offspring less aggressive towards people.

== Creation of new breeds ==
Some amateur dog fans in Bulgaria are creating new big dog show breeds with which the Karakachan dog should not be confused. These are cross-breeds of Karakachan dogs with giant breeds such as Caucasian Ovcharka, Central Asian Ovcharka, Moscow Watchdog, Saint Bernard, Landseer and Newfoundland. The goal is to create giant, heavy dogs similar in coloration to the native Karakachan dog. These new dogs are bred mostly as pets.

== Popular culture ==
When U.S. President George W. Bush visited Bulgaria in 2003, the Bulgarian president Georgi Parvanov presented him with a Karakachan Shepherd. This dog was later re-gifted to one of their friends who live with her Bulgarian American husband in a farm in Maryland, to avoid taking the dog to the Bush farm in Texas, due to the heat in the region. The Bulgarian Prime Minister Boyko Borisov also gave a Karakachan dog, called Buffy to Russian PM Vladimir Putin as a gift in 2010.

== See also ==
- List of dog breeds
- Macedonian Karaman
- Šarplaninac
- Greek Shepherd

== Notes ==
- "Karakachan-karakachansko kuche". John Zeiner & Sider and Atila Sedefchev.
- "BBPS Semperviva". save-foundation. Archived from the original on 2008-05-07.
- "National pride on four legs". The sofiaecho. Archived from the original on 2016-03-04.
- "VHB-Dutch Kennel Club" (in Dutch).
- Marinov, Miroslav; Teofanova, D.; Gadjev, D.; Radoslavov, G.; Hristov, P. (27 June 2018). "Mitochondrial diversity of Bulgarian native dogs suggests dual phylogenetic origin, 2018". PeerJ. 6 e5060. doi:10.7717/peerj.5060. PMC 6026455. PMID 29967734.
