= Denmark Feist =

- Other names: DenMark Feist
- Origin: United States
- Breed status: Not recognized as a breed by any major kennel club.
Traits
- Height: 15–18 in (38–46 cm)
- Weight: 25–35 lb (11–16 kg)
- Coat: Short
- Color: Red, yellow or red and white spotted

The Denmark Feist, sometimes written DenMark Feist, is a breed of feist from Virginia in the United States.

== Overview ==
The Denmark Feist is descended from a single dog acquired by the Slade family of Chatham, Virginia in 1917, supposedly the dog was bartered from a travelling salesman for three opossum hides, a large raccoon and a wagon wheel. The family were so impressed with the hunting abilities of this dog that they used him as the foundation sire of a line of dogs. In 1984 Mark Slade, with friend Dennis Willis, unveiled these dogs as a breed, in 1986 the DenMark Treeing Feist Association was formed.

The Denmark Feist is used to hunt feral pig, bobcat and squirrel, they are said to be silent hunters that can hunt game on the ground or run the game into trees for the hunter to shoot.

The Denmark Feist has a short, rough coat that is usually red or yellow but occasionally red and white, it is a muscular breed standing between 15 and 18 inches (38 and 46 cm) and weighing between 25 and 35 pounds (11 and 16 kg), they have a broad muzzle, semi-erect ears and the tail is short, some have a naturally bobbed tail whilst those without are usually docked.

== See also ==
- List of dog breeds
