= Mi-Ki =

- A male Miki
- Origin: Wisconsin
Traits
- Height: Ideal 7–9 in (180–230 mm), maximum 10–11 in (250–280 mm)
- Weight: Up to 10 lb (4.5 kg); some registries cite an ideal of 4–5 lb (1.8–2.3 kg)
- Coat: Single-coated, in two varieties: long coat (with facial furnishings) and smooth face (no furnishings)
- Color: All colors and patterns, solid or parti-color

The Mi-Ki (pronounced /miːkiː/) is a small companion dog breed developed in the United States. A rare toy breed, it is single-coated and is bred in two varieties: a long coat with facial furnishings and a smooth face without them. The breed is generally dated to the 1980s and is credited to Wisconsin breeder Maureen van Wormer, also known as Mikki Mackin and Maureen Westberg.

Van Wormer did not keep accurate records of the early crossbreeding, so the exact foundation breeds and their proportions are undocumented; breed registries and reference works commonly name the Shih Tzu, Maltese, Papillon, Japanese Chin, and Yorkshire Terrier. Whether the Mi-Ki is best described as a distinct purebred or as a crossbreed is characterized differently across sources: breed registries describe it as a purebred developed through closed studbooks, while some general references describe it as a crossbreed.

The breed is kept primarily as a companion and is described as calm, quiet, and friendly; it is also used in therapy work. The United Kennel Club (UKC) recognized the Mi-Ki on January 1, 2016.

== History and development ==
=== Origins and foundation ===
Independent references generally date the breed to the 1980s. According to van Wormer's own account—given largely from memory and published in a breed-registry newsletter in 2011—she began crossbreeding in 1959, starting from a Shih Tzu foundation to which she later added Papillon, Maltese, Yorkshire Terrier, and Japanese Chin. No contemporaneous breeding records survive: van Wormer did not document the early crossings, and pedigree records for her dogs were destroyed in a fire in 1995. Published histories of the breed's early development differ, and the UKC notes that because van Wormer did not keep accurate records, the exact combination of breeds remains unknown. The breed is named after van Wormer's childhood nickname, "Mikki".

=== Registries and recognition ===
Differences over breeding philosophy, outcrossing, and the recognition of coat varieties led to the formation of several independent Mi-Ki clubs and registries during the late 1990s and 2000s. The International Mi-Ki Registry, Inc. was founded in March 1999 by Connie Faye Abel, Annette Jurkiewicz, and Cindy Jurkiewicz. Individual registries maintain separate, closed studbooks.

The Mi-Ki is included in the breed databases of commercial canine DNA services, including Mars Petcare's Wisdom Panel and Embark. Breed registries cite testing by these services in support of the breed's status.

The UKC recognized the Mi-Ki on January 1, 2016. According to a breed-club account, the UKC extended recognition to both the long-coat and smooth-face varieties in 2024.

== Description ==
=== Appearance ===
The Mi-Ki is a small toy dog of fine to medium bone, with a body slightly longer than it is tall at the withers.

The head is proportionate to the body, with a well-rounded skull and a well-defined stop. The muzzle is short—no longer than about one-quarter of the length of the head—and ends in a dark nose. The eyes are large, round, dark, and set well apart. The bite is scissors or slightly undershot.

A distinctive feature is the breed's mobile ear carriage. The ears may be dropped or erect, and both may "wing"—flaring laterally outward—when the dog is alert. Both ears should match.

=== Coat ===
The breed is shown in two coat varieties.

Long coat
A long, straight, silky single coat without an undercoat, with facial furnishings including a mustache and beard, and feathering on the ears, legs, and tail.
Smooth face
A short, close-lying coat on the face, muzzle, and skull, without facial furnishings; body hair is shorter, with light fringing on the ears, legs, and tail.

The Mi-Ki is a single-coated, low-shedding breed; the long coat still requires regular grooming to prevent matting. All colors and patterns—solid or parti-color—are accepted under the breed standard.

== Temperament ==
The Mi-Ki is described as calm, quiet, friendly, and sociable with people and other animals. Breed sources report a relatively low tendency to bark compared with some other toy breeds, and the breed is used in therapy work.

== Health ==
The Mi-Ki is generally reported to live into its teens, with figures around 13 to 15 years commonly cited. As with other toy breeds, it is susceptible to certain hereditary conditions. Parent clubs, in cooperation with the Orthopedic Foundation for Animals (OFA) and its Canine Health Information Center (CHIC) program, recommend health screening of breeding stock.

Conditions reported in the breed include:

- Patellar luxation, in which the kneecap slips out of its groove; clubs recommend orthopedic evaluation of breeding stock.
- Progressive retinal atrophy (PRA), a group of inherited diseases causing gradual retinal degeneration; screening uses DNA testing and ophthalmologic examination.
- Congenital cardiac conditions, including cardiac murmurs and patent ductus arteriosus (PDA); screening involves auscultation.
- Hyperuricosuria (HUU), a metabolic condition that can lead to urinary stones; a DNA test is available.
- Chondrodystrophy (CDDY) and intervertebral disc disease (IVDD), which affect disc structure and can predispose to disc herniation.

== See also ==
- Lap dog
- List of dog breeds
