= Alopekis =

Alopekis (Αλωπεκίς)
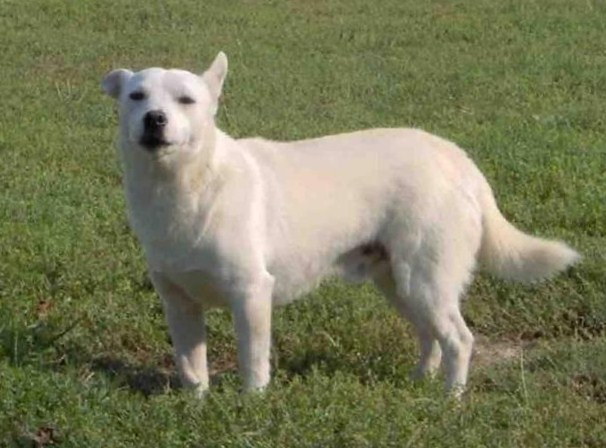
- White Alopekis
- Origin: Greece
- Breed status: Not recognised as a breed by any major kennel club.
Traits
- Height: 20–30 centimetres (7.9–11.8 in)
- Weight: 3.5–7.5 kilograms (7.7–16.5 lb)

The Alopekis (Greek: Αλωπεκίς) is a small, ancient, primitive landrace of dog from Greece and adjacent regions of the Balkan peninsula. Alopekis have prick ears, a curved tail, and a double coat. Alopekis were bred as a multipurpose farm dog, functioning as a hunting dog, watchdog and shepherd. The dog is found throughout Greece but is most commonly seen in northern Greek regions with a lot of farmland and villages, such as Serres, Drama, Xanthi, etc. Critically endangered, the exact number of specimens that remain today is unknown.

This breed is not recognized by the Fédération Cynologique Internationale.

== Etymology ==
The Ancient Greek word ἀλωπεκίς (alōpekís) means 'mongrel between fox and dog'. Ancient sources like Aristophanes also describe them as "Κυναλώπηξ" (Kunalṓpēx), which has the same meaning. The dog has many additional names including Alepuditsa, Alepudoskylo, Venetaki, Zacharoskylo, Moropa, Bombis or Bouboudi, Tsoupi or Tsupaki, and Fneli / Fnoudi (local idioms).

== History ==
The domestication of the Alopekis dog in Greece dates before the Mycenaean era., i.e. 1750 B.C. The earliest depiction comes from the post-Paleolithic / Neolithic era (3000 BC Neolithic Greece). It is an engraved pithos from Thessaly that bears a scribble with the characteristic silhouette of an Alopekis and is in the archaeological museum of Athens. This find places the breed in the same historical period and geographical area as the Pelasgians. This is the oldest depiction of a dog in Greece. A similar find was also found in Rafina and dates from the Early Bronze Age (2500–2100 BC).

Ancient Greek classical authors mention the breed, including Aristotle, Xenophon and Aristophanes. Xenophon describes the Alopekis as one of the two main Greek examples of hunting dogs in his work Cynegeticus. Ancient authors including Xenophon believed that Aopekis were created by mating dogs and foxes.

The Alopekis has experienced a massive reduction in population, in part because of the mass sterilization of dogs in some regions to reduce the number of strays. There are still small populations in Northern Greece. Greek native groups are now working to preserve the breed.

== Description ==
=== Appearance ===
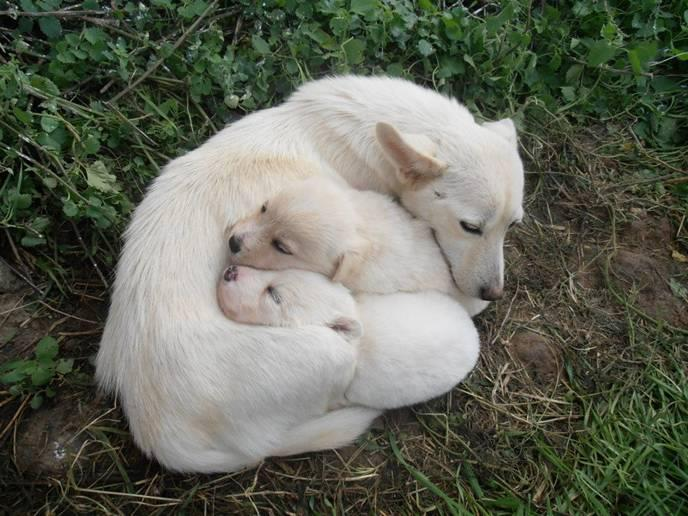
Alopekis mother with puppies

Alopekis are small, fox-like, relatively short-haired with wedge-shaped head, erect ears and sickle-shaped tail. Their body is longer than their height. Alopekis are classified as primitive dogs: they have regular dentition and a mesomorphic, symmetrical build and body type, with an arched or semicircular tail. Typical individuals do not show dwarfism. Their bodies are robust and their limbs are not markedly shortened (and acquired clubfoot is an undesirable feature). Breed proportions indicate a model of progressive downsizing through evolution, adaptation, and artificial selection.

Alopekis average 25–30 centimetres (9.8–11.8 in) high at the withers and weigh an average of 4–7 kilograms (8.8–15.4 lb). The breed has three types of double coat: a) a short, hard, and smooth coat, b) semi-long, tufted, rough coat and c) semi-long, hard, wiry coat. The coat is usually never thin, sparse, soft and silky, nor is the protective-insulating undercoat missing, because this is a robust small-medium sized breed of general utility that should be able to live outdoors comfortably. The coat is easy to groom and the texture and quality of the coat helps keep it clean. Alopekis are very clean by nature and clean themselves frequently and diligently. All colors and color combinations are acceptable, except for the absence of pigment (albino). The most common colors are white, black, brown and bicolor (black and white, white with black or brown patches, black with white markings, brown with fiery markings), and less often whitish, pale yellow and other colors.

=== Temperament ===
As a companion, Alopekis are very obedient, quiet, and loyal to their owners. Alopekis are usually very expressive and friendly towards people, however they are alert dogs that are protective of other farm animals and good with children. Alopekis are also good hunters, especially against pests like rats. Alopekis are high energy dogs capable of covering very long distances. They are versatile dogs suitable for either an urban or rural home, and adapt readily as a companion for all ages.

== Usage ==
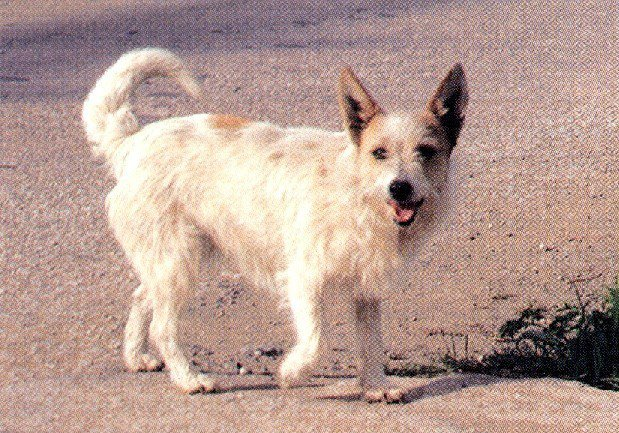
Wire-haired Alopekis

Alopekis populations existed throughout Greece until recently and one of their traditional uses was the extermination of rodents such as rats and mice, as well as the protection of domestic poultry from foxes, jackals and ferrets. With their small-medium size, Alopekis comfortably nest together with hens and ducks in the backyard chicken coop and also coexist & work well with the larger Greek sheepdogs and livestock guarding dogs, such as Molossian LGDs, on the farm. The breed is an excellent watchdog, showing bravery and strength when needed.

== See also ==
- List of dog breeds
