= Lithuanian Hound =

- Origin: Lithuania
- Breed status: Not recognized as a breed by any major kennel club.
Traits
Height	Males	52–60 cm (20–24 in)
	Females	48–55 cm (19–22 in)
- Weight: 24–30 kg (53–66 lb)
- Colour: black with tan

The Lithuanian Hound (Lithuanian: lietuvių skalikas) is a rare, medium-size hunting dog from Lithuania. It is the only dog breed originating from Lithuania and dates back to the medieval Grand Duchy of Lithuania. However, the breed is not recognized by the Fédération Cynologique Internationale (FCI).

== History ==
The Lithuanian Hound has been traditionally used to hunt hare, fox, and boar. It is believed that it comes from the mixing of bloodhounds with several other hound breeds. Russian zoologist Leonid Pavlovich Sabaneyev claimed that the hounds were most closely related to St. Hubert Hounds and were brought from France in the 15th century. In the 19th century, authors described up to five different local breeds or types of hounds used for hunting in Lithuania. They differed in size and were used to hunt different animals (for example, smaller type was used to hunt hares, while large dogs known as ogars were used to hunt deer), but they all had black with tan fur.

The breed was first mentioned in written sources in 1541 when a forester from Hrodna sued over a stolen hound. The breed was also mentioned in the Statutes of Lithuania (1588). Once a popular breed in Lithuania, the population decreased to 78 individuals after World War II. Thanks to several enthusiasts, the hound was revived and standardized. The provisional standard was established in 1966 and revised in 1983. There were not enough individual dogs left to revive the sub-breeds or types of the hound, therefore breeders settled on a more universal type. The first Lithuanian Hound exhibition was organized in 1981; it had 62 dogs participating. The number of registered and documented dogs reached around 350 in 1987. After the dissolution of the Soviet Union, the breed decreased to around 150 individuals by 1998. The decrease in popularity is explained by changing hunting habits: the Lithuanian Hound is best suited for hunting large animals in large open areas, but modern hunting plots are decreasing in size. Due to the small population, inbreeding is a major concern of the breeders. A study in 2008 calculated the coefficient of inbreeding at 2.09% and relatedness at 6.74%.

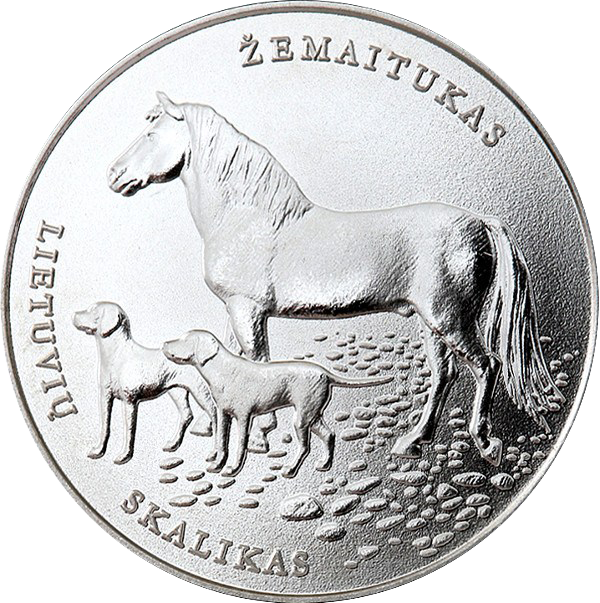
Commemorative Euro coin with two Lithuanian Hounds and a Žemaitukas

== Characteristics ==
It is sturdy and heavy-boned, but at the same time sleek and muscular. It has a short black coat with some brown on snout, chest, ears, forehead. The official standard allows for a small white spot on the chest, but not on toes. Fur is thick and short, up to 3–5 centimetres (1.2–2.0 in) in length. The dog's long tail is sword-shaped and naturally low. The head is large, chest is broad, deep and low. Ears are long with rounded tips, and hang close to the cheeks. Neck is quite long and strong with no dewlap. The feet are straight, strong and round, with compact toes, helping it be a fast, very agile, and determined pursuer. The dogs are energetic and need rigorous exercise. They are responsive to training.

== Commemoration ==
In June 2011, during a city festival, a sculpture of the Lithuanian Hound was unveiled in Telšiai. Zigmas Goštautas, who was instrumental in reviving the breed in 1950s, was a resident of Telšiai. In May 2015, a sculpture of three hounds by Rimantas Keturka and Feliksas Volčakas was unveiled near the Vilnius Castle Complex. In 2017, Bank of Lithuania issued a commemorative coin (in 10 and 1.5 euros denominations) that depict two Lithuanian Hounds and a Žemaitukas (a Lithuanian horse breed).

== See also ==
- List of dog breeds
