= Treeing Feist =

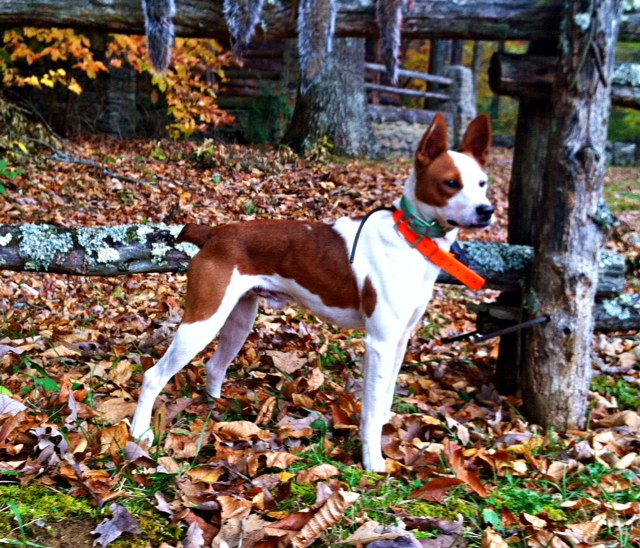
- Other names: Mountain Treeing Feist; American Treeing Feist
- Origin: United States
Traits
- Height: 12–18 in (30–46 cm)
- Weight: 12–30 lb (5.4–13.6 kg)
- Coat: Short
- Color: Any color or color pattern
Kennel club standards
- United Kennel Club: standard

Mountain Feist
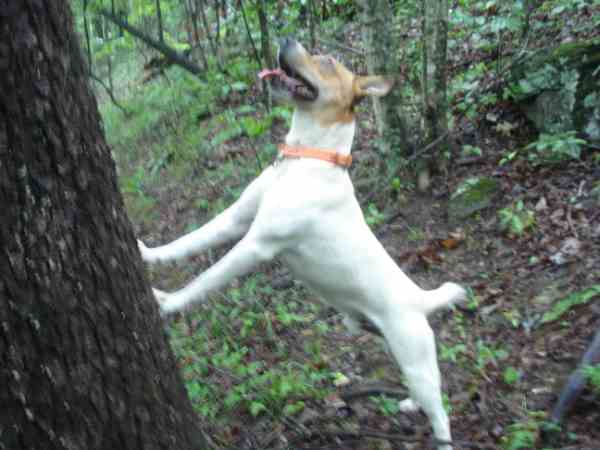
Kennel club standards
- United Kennel Club: standard

The Treeing Feist is a breed of feist from the Southeastern United States. Originally considered a single breed, Treeing Feist and Mountain Feist are now separately recognized by the United Kennel Club. Feist, originally bred to hunt squirrels, were separated into several breeds, often crossed with rat terriers. Several Appalachian breeders chose black Feists and bred smaller to tree, 'ring' and retrieve squirrels.

== History ==
In the 19th century a small type of dog developed in the mountainous regions of the Southeastern United States. Used to hunt small game, these dogs were bred from terriers and hounds. These dogs became known as the Treeing Feist; feist is a derivation of fist and is a term used in Southern America for a small fierce dog. The word treeing refers to their hunting style of running game up into trees and indicating to the hunter which tree the game has climbed. Both the Treeing and Mountain Feist breeds are used to hunt small game, particularly squirrel and rodents, as well as raccoons, opossums, rabbits and for flushing birds.

In the 20th century these dogs became increasingly rare and in the early 1980s a group of devotees banded together to prevent their extinction. In 1984 the Mountain Feist Association was formed; in 1985 this was replaced by the American Treeing Feist Association, and this was joined by the Mountain Feist Breeder's Club in 1986, the Mountain Treeing Feist Organization in 1992 and the Traditional Treeing Feist Club in 1999. In 1998 the United Kennel Club recognized the Treeing Feist as a breed, in 2015 they recognized the Mountain Feist as a separate breed.

== Description ==
Both breeds are described as small, active, alert dogs; they have short, dense coats that can be found in any color, combination of colors or color patterns. They usually have pricked ears although semi-pricked ears are common and their tails can be docked at any length or left intact.

Originally they could be found in a very broad size range, being anywhere between 10 and 22 inches (25 and 56 cm) in height and 10 to 35 pounds (4.5 to 15.9 kg) in weight. The United Kennel Club breed standards for both breeds restricts this somewhat to heights between 12 and 18 inches (30 and 46 cm) and weights between 12 and 30 pounds (5.4 and 13.6 kg).

== See also ==
- List of dog breeds
