= Briquet de Provence =

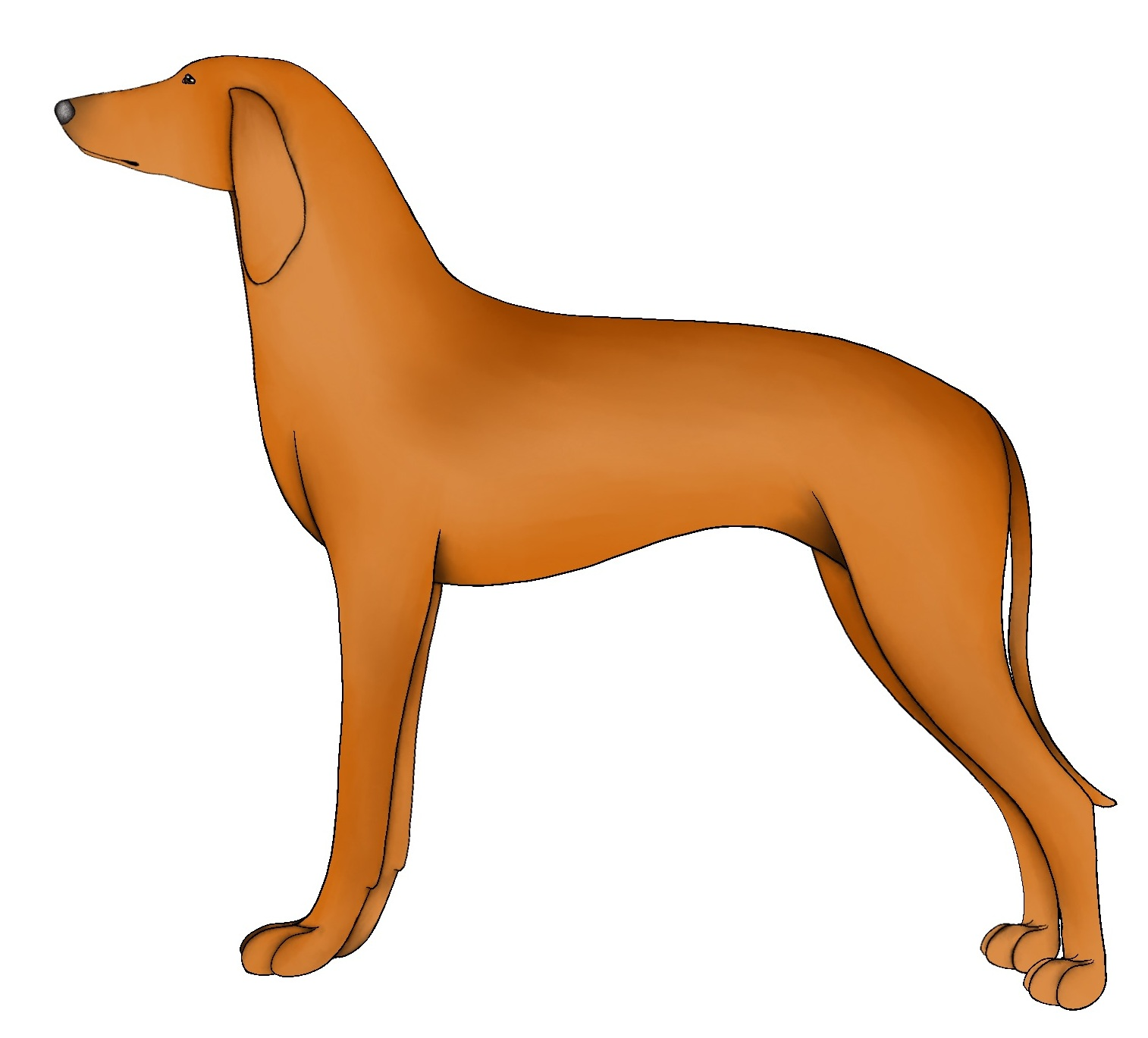
- Digital drawing of a Briquet de Provence.
- Origin: France
Traits
Height	Males	50-55 cm
	Females	44-50 cm
- Color: fawn, charred fawn, fawn with black coat
Kennel club standards
- Société Centrale Canine: standard

The Briquet de Provence is a rare scenthound from Provence, in southeast France. It is one of the five non-FCI recognized breeds recognized by French canine organization Société Centrale Canine.

== History ==
The exact origins of Briquet de Provence are unclear. The name Briquet means "mixed dog" in Provençal. Dogs of this type have been described in literature since 1440. A standard was first described for the breed in 1934, at which time the breed was plentiful. However, World War II saw a sharp decline in the breed's population.

Organized breeding to preserve the breed began around 1980, and a breed club was founded in 2003. The Briquet de Provence was recognized by the SCC in 2006 and its standard was last changed in 2008. The Briquet de Provence continues to be a rare dog breed, often with less than ten new dogs registered annually with the SCC.

== Description ==
The breed is medium-sized, well-balanced. The body length is slightly greater than the height at the withers. The snout is the same length or slightly shorter than the skull, the stop is not very pronounced. The bite is strong and developed as a scissor bite; missing premolars and/or a pincer bite are tolerated. The ears are set at eye level or slightly below, the front edge is slightly curled outwards. Its tip must reach at least the base of the nose. There is a dewlap at the throat. The belly is slightly pulled up, the tail is set low and is carried high when working.

The short coat is red reminiscent of a brick, with or without a black coat. A little white on feet, tip of tail, chest and forehead is acceptable but not desirable. Males are 50–55 centimetres (20–22 in) in height; females are 44–50 centimetres (17–20 in). Average weight is 18–27 kilograms (40–60 lb).

=== Temperament ===
The Briquet de Provence is a brave, efficient and resilient hunting dog used primarily for wild boar and hares. They have a friendly, obedient disposition that develops a strong bond with its owner and needs to get along well with other dogs. They have a pronounced hunting voice which they reserve for hunting. Briquet de Provence are energetic and fast dogs that require considerable exercise, as they do not tire quickly.

== Health ==
Briquet de Provences lives for approximately 11–13 years. No diseases and health conditions are associated with the breed.
