= Liangshan Dog =

- Other names: Nianshan Gou(攆山狗), Liangshan Hound, Hushan Dog
- Origin: China
Traits
- Weight: 15 kg
- Color: Black, black cyan, black yellow, etc.

The Liangshan Dog (Chinese: 凉山犬) is a medium-sized scenthound originally bred by the Yi people of Liangshan Yi Prefecture in Sichuan province, China. Liangshan dogs are prized for their tracking ability, endurance and ferocity while hunting wild boar in mountainous terrain. Liangshan dogs hunt a variety of prey at variable altitudes and climates and are often deliberately underfed to improve drive to be successful.

== Description ==
Liangshan dogs have triangular eyes, rounded drop ears, a short, double coat and bushy curved tails. Their heads are black; however, the rest of their body is a mix of reds, yellows, and grey. It is not unusual for the hairs to be banded.
