= Dikkulak =

Turkish dog breed

- Other names: Turkish Dikkulak, Dikkulak Köpeği, Çivikulak, Zagar
- Origin: Turkey
Traits
Height	Males	11.0 in (27.9 cm)
	Females	10.9 in (27.7 cm)
Weight	Males	22 lb (10.1 kg)
	Females	23 lb (10.5 kg)
- Coat: short
- Color: white, black, brown, tan, piebald

The Dikkulak is a small spitz dog native to the Agri, Ardahan, Erzurum, Igdir, and Kars provinces in Turkey, the same areas as the Kangal. It is used as a small guard dog.

== History ==
The Dikkulak is a local breed native to the Agri, Ardahan, Erzurum, Igdir and Kars Provinces in Turkey.

It is used as a watch dog, for which it is either tethered or allowed to roam in an enclosed area. Breeders say that the number of dogs is gradually decreasing.

== Characteristics ==
The Dikkulak is a small, compact spitz dog with erect ears. It has short legs, similar to spitz-type cow herders such as Swedish Vallhund and Pembroke Corgi. It has a short haired coat in either white, black, brown, tan, or piebald.

As a traditional watch dog, the Dikkulak is vocal and will alert its family to strangers with a loud bark. It will generally not attack like a guard dog, but they don't like strangers and will not be friendly. The Dikkulak are not considered suitable pet dogs, as they are working dogs that needs a lot of exercise and space to run.
