= Fu Quan =

Rare Chinese working dog breed

- Other names: Xiong Quan, Long Quan, Tian Quan, Chinese Fu Quan, Fu Dog, Chinese Foo Dog, Chinese Temple Forest Dog, Chinese Foo, Chinese Choo Hunting Dog, Chinese Dragon Dog, Chinese Celestial Dog, Sacred Dog of Sinkiang
- Origin: China
Traits
- Height: 13–20 in (33–50 cm) Shoulder height: less than 25cm (toy type), 25cm~38cm (mini type), greater than 38cm (standard type).
- Weight: 42–66 lb (19–30 kg) Body weight: less than 9kg (toy type), 9.5kg to 22kg (mini type), more than 23kg (standard type).
- Coat: Rough
- Color: Black, Black & Tan, Blue, Fawn, Gray, Light Brown, Orange, Red, Sable, Silver, Wolf Color Wool color: There are many different colors. Acceptable colors may be all dark or combined black, such as: black, blue, brown and blue, cream and sable, brown, orange, golden and dark mahogany, sable, medium gray and silver.

Fu quan (福犬), also known as xiong quan (熊犬), long quan (龍犬), tian quan (天犬), Chinese foo dog, Chinese foo and Chinese temple forest dog, is a rare working dog breed that originated in China. Due to the fu quan's rarity, they are on the list of endangered and protected species of China.

== Background ==
The fu quan has been present in China for at least 3,000 years ago. There are multiple origins theorized, including that the fu quan was originally a mix of Northern Europe's wolves and Chow Chows and another being a mixture of Chinese wolves and Chow Chows. Fu quan are versatile working dogs. The Chinese use fu quan as a shepherd dog, hunting dog, guard dog and sled dog. Today, the fu quan can also be used as a companion dog.

In addition to being used as working dogs, Fu Quan are also the mascots of Chinese temples and are considered by the Chinese to bring good luck. Because Fu Quan were believed to bring good fortune, they were used as national symbols during the Tang dynasty.

== Appearance ==
The fu quan is spitz tugou with a compact, square-shaped body, broad head, pricked ears, deep chest, muscular loin, and a tail that is carried over their back. This dog has a thick, rough coat that comes in a variety of colors, such as silver, blue, black, brown, or red.

== History ==
Fu Quan (quan, 福犬) have played an important role in ancient Chinese culture. In early times, they were used in religious sacrifices and royal hunting. Books like Zhouli (The Rites of Zhou) and Liji (The Book of Rites) recorded their uses. In Zhouli, dogs were listed as one of the "six domestic animals" for sacrifices, and special officials managed them for the royal court. In Liji, dogs were considered valuable offerings and had to be raised properly according to rituals. These records show that dogs were important in both religion and daily life in ancient China.

== Art and folk culture ==
In later periods, especially during the Song, Ming, and Qing dynasties, Fu Quan became symbols of good fortune (fu, 福), loyalty, and prosperity in Chinese culture. Small, friendly dogs often appeared in paintings and decorations as lucky animals. In traditional folk beliefs, raising a dog was thought to bring safety, happiness, and wealth to the household.

In Chinese art, Fu Quan has shown playing with children, symbolizing family harmony and future blessings. A famous example is the painting "Children Playing with Dogs" (《婴戏图》) attributed to Song dynasty artist Su Hanchen (苏汉臣), where Fu Quan are depicted alongside playful children to express wishes for a happy and prosperous family.

During the Ming and Qing dynasties, New Year prints in Fujian (nianhua, 年画) have featured Fu Quan to convey blessings for wealth and longevity. One common theme was "Dog Brings Blessings" (Gou Lai Fu, 狗来福), showing this certain dog entering a house with auspicious symbols like peaches and gold ingots.

== Decline ==
Fu Quan is now endangered, with fewer than 15 individuals worldwide.
