= Kokoni =

Greek breed of dog

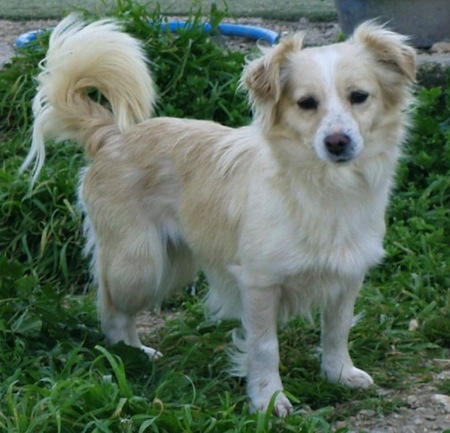

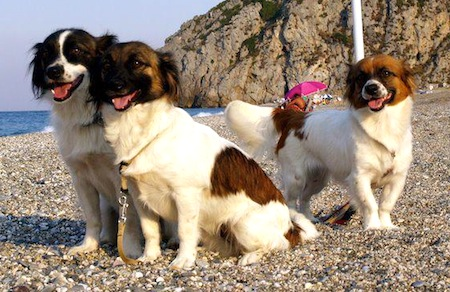
- Other names: Greek: Κοκόνι
- Origin: Greece
Traits
- Weight: 4 to 8 kg
- Coat: straight, slightly wavy, or wavy
- Colour: any
Kennel club standards
- Kennel Club of Greece: standard

The Kokoni (Greek: Κοκόνι) is a Greek breed of small domestic dog of toy type, usually kept as a companion animal. It was recognised by the Kennel Club of Greece in 2004, but is not recognised by the Fédération Cynologique Internationale.

== History ==
Small companion dogs appear on ancient Greek vases dating back to the fifth century BCE. These dogs were often illustrated sitting beside their owners or playing, highlighting their role as cherished household pets. Archaeological findings and historical texts suggest that small dogs resembling the Kokoni were common in Greek homes, valued for their companionship and alert nature. Their presence in ancient art indicates their longstanding relationship with humans in Greek society.

The modern Kokoni was recognised by the Kennel Club of Greece in 2004.

== Characteristics ==
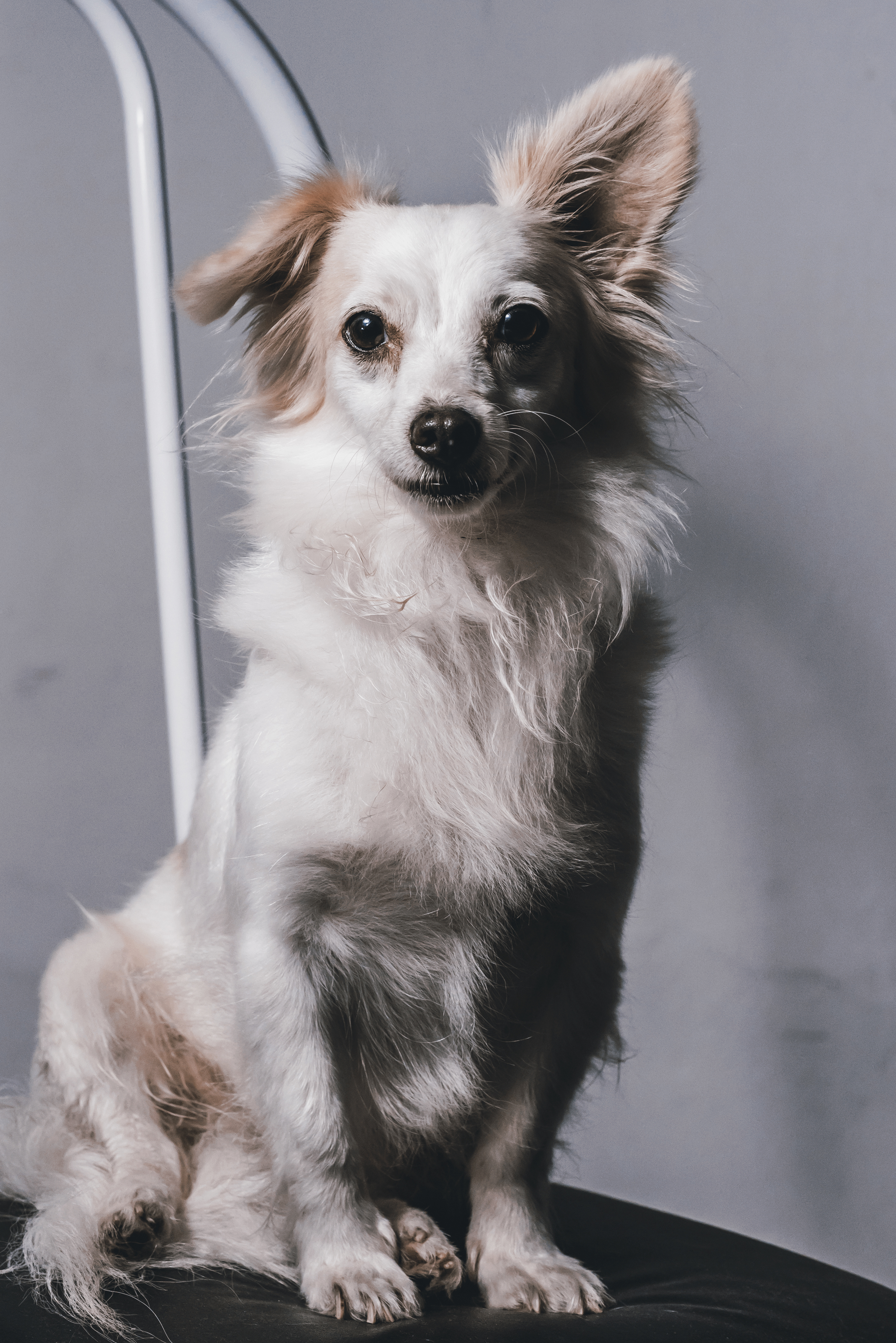
The coat may be slightly wavy

It is a small dog, with a height at the withers of some 24–28 cm for males or about 1 cm less for females; body weights are in the range 4 to 8 kg for both sexes. The dogs have dropped ears, a short muzzle, and a bushy tail; the body is longer than it is tall.
