= Mantiqueira Shepherd =

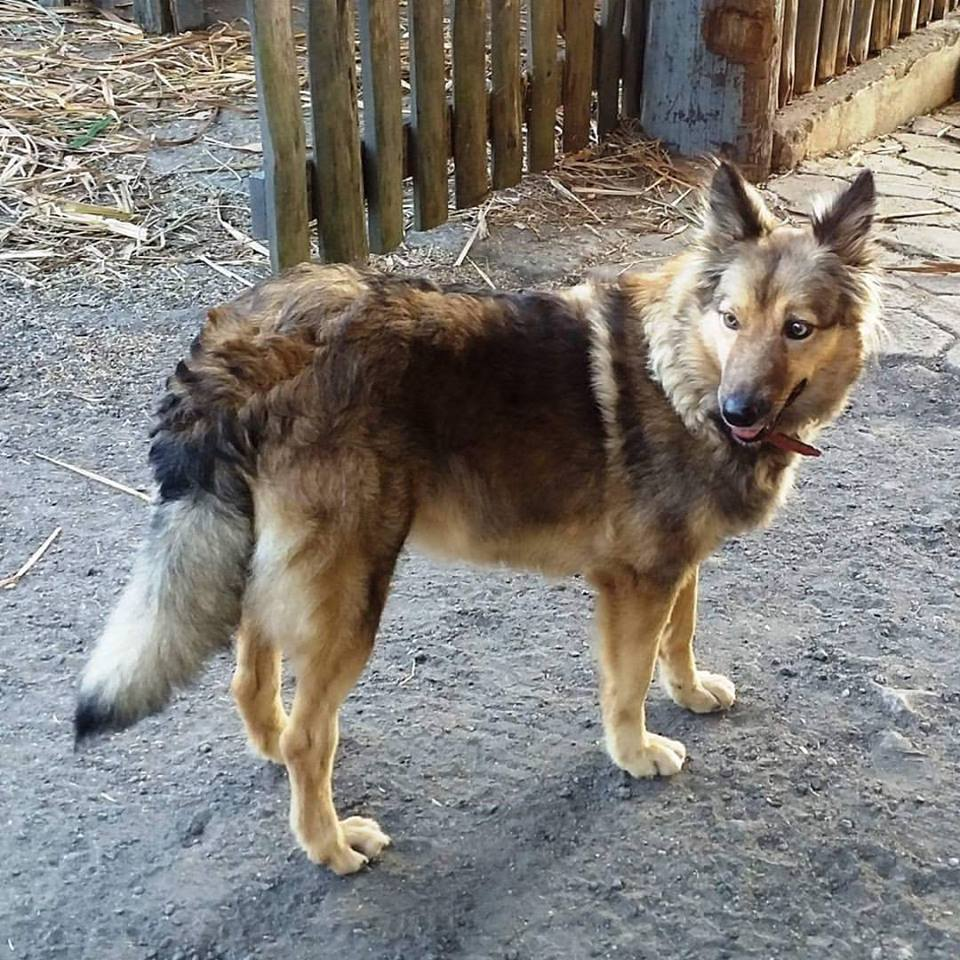
- A Mantiqueira Shepherd Dog
- Other names: Cão Pastor da Mantiqueira, Policial, Pastorzinho caipira, Pastor brasileiro, Policialzinho
- Origin: Brazil
Traits
- Height: 53 cm (21 in) at the withers
- Weight: Up to 25 kg (55 lbs)
- Coat: Long, medium, and short (smooth, short, and curly varieties)
- Notes: Recognized by SOBRACI, ALKC, CBKC

The Mantiqueira Shepherd Dog (Cão-pastor-da-mantiqueira), also known by the nicknames "Policialzinho" ("Little Policeman") or "Pastor Brasileiro" ("Brazilian Shepherd"), is a medium-sized herding dog breed that originated in the Serra da Mantiqueira mountains, in the Southeast Region of Brazil.

It functions primarily as a cattle dog (boiadeiro) and is valued for its intelligence and working ability. The breed is recognized by several national kennel clubs, including the SOBRACI (Sociedade Brasileira de Cinofilia), the ALKC (America Latina Kennel Clube), and primarily by the Confederação Brasileira de Cinofilia (CBKC), which is the principal Brazilian affiliate of the Fédération Cynologique Internationale (FCI).

Three main coat varieties exist: long coat, medium coat, and short coat (which can be smooth, short, or curly). Males stand approximately 53 cm (21 in) at the withers and weigh up to 25 kg (55 lbs).
