= Corsican Dog =

French breed of dog

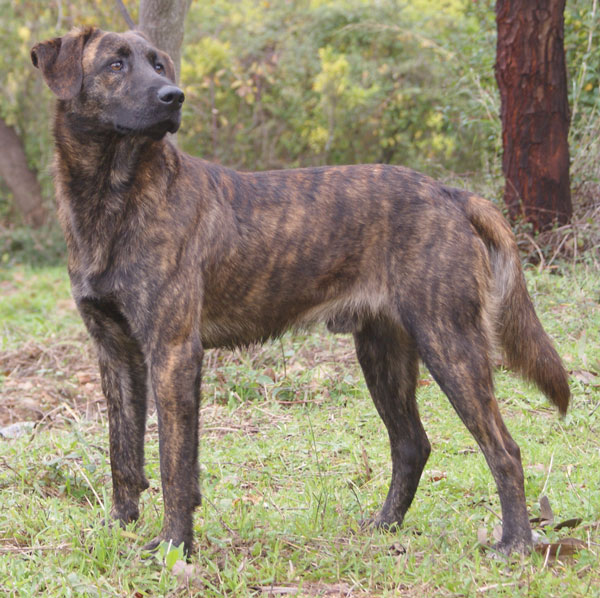
- A Cursinu in profile
- Other names: cursinu, chien corse
- Origin: Corsica (France)
Traits
- Weight: approx 25kg
- Coat: Thick, short or medium-length
- Colour: All shades of tan and black with or without brindle. Limited white patches.
Kennel club standards
- Société Centrale Canine: standard

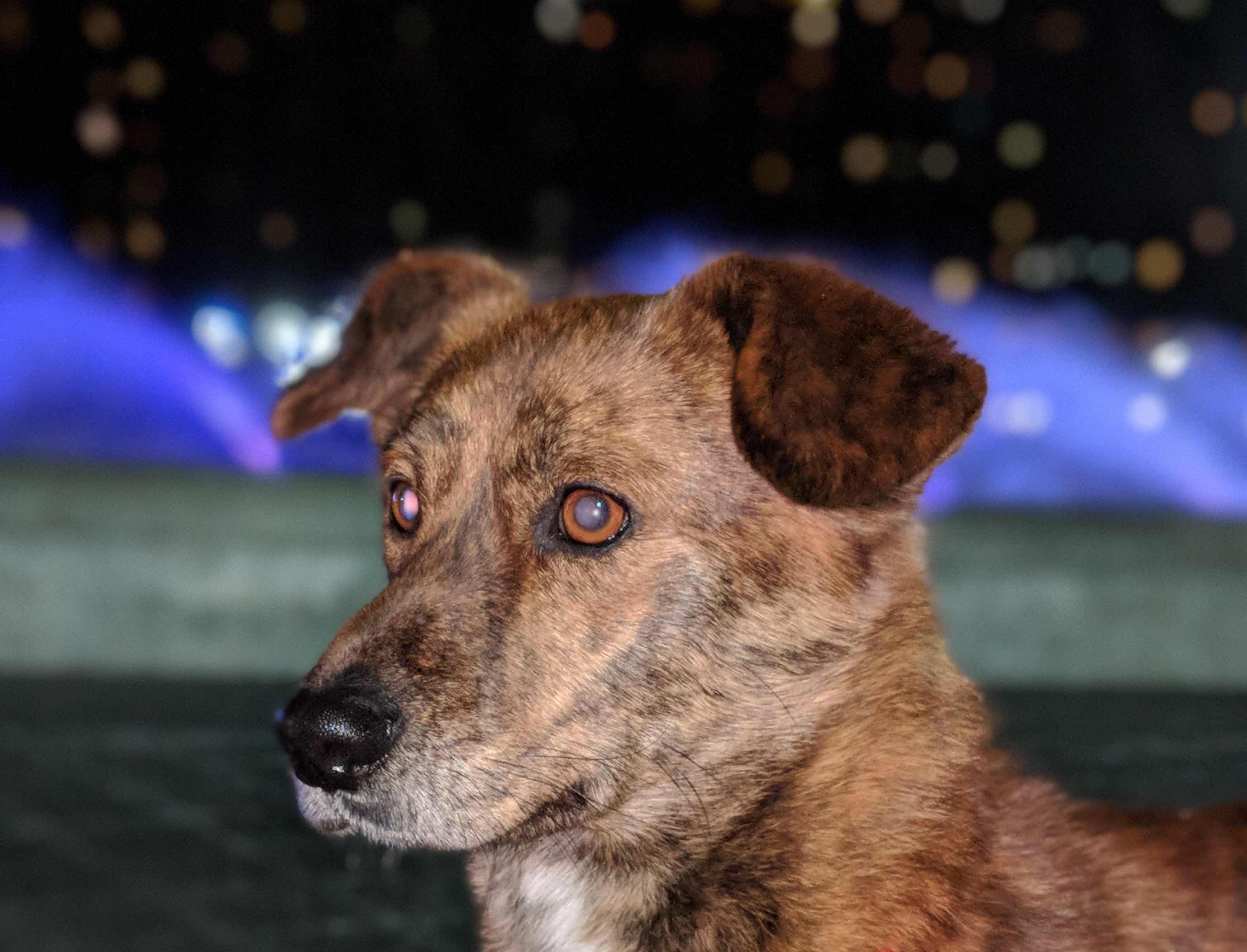
A young Cursinu

The Corsican Dog (chien corse) or Cursinu, is a breed of dog originating from Corsica. It has existed on the island since the 16th century, but went into decline during the late 20th century; however it was saved and became recognized by the Société Centrale Canine. Used for a variety of working purposes, it has no specific health issues.

== History ==
Corsican Dogs have been known on Corsica since the 16th century. Until the 1950s, the breed was used as a versatile hunting and farming dog on the island. During the second half of the 20th century the breed suffered due to competition from continental breeds. In 1989 the L'association de Sauvegarde du Chien Corse was set up to safeguard the breed.

The breed has been recognised by the Société Centrale Canine, the French kennel club, since 2003; it is placed in the spitz and primitive group breeds, as a primitive breed.

== Description ==
The breed measures 46–58 centimetres (18–23 in) at the withers with male dogs being slightly larger than females. Their coat can be fringed, with usual colors being brindle, fawn, black and tan or brown. The presence of a melanistic mask is permitted under the breed standard. White markings can be on the chest or the legs. The skin of the dog adheres closely to the body, and dewlaps do not appear in the breed. Corsican dogs can also have a long, fluffy coat.

=== Use ===
It is a versatile breed, having been used as a sheepdog, as well as to herd cattle and in some instances for dog fighting. In hunting it is most often used in hunting wild boar, but has been used for fox and hare. It is still used as a herding dog, a watchdog and for companionship. It may require further training than some other breeds, but can become a pleasant companion to its owner.

There are no breed-specific health issues.
