= Tonya Finosu =

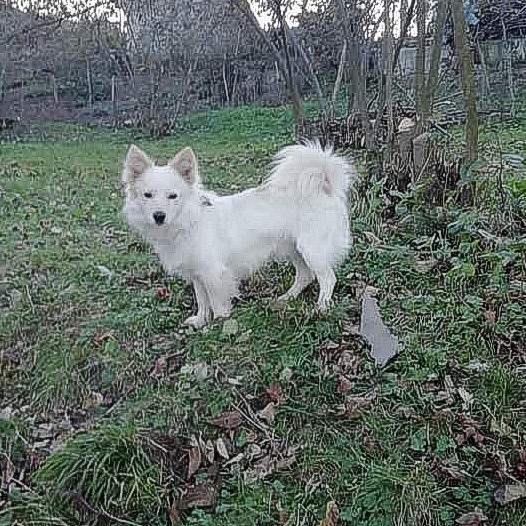
- Tonya Finosu
- Other names: Fino of Tonya, Kobi
- Origin: Turkey
Traits
- Height: 12 in (30 cm)
| Weight | Males | 22–26 lb (10–12 kg) |
| | Females | 20–24 lb (9–11 kg) |
- Coat: Double
- Color: white

The Tonya Finosu is a white spitz dog indigenous to Trabzon, Turkey, especially the city of Tonya. Tonya Finosu are valued both for their natural suspicion of strangers as well as their playfulness and affection with their family.

== History ==
There is a scarcity of historical information available about this particular breed. However, the most popular theory is that original Tonya Finosu were acquired from sailors who frequented the Baltic and Black Sea ports during the Russian Fur trade into Europe and parts of Asia through the early Middle Ages

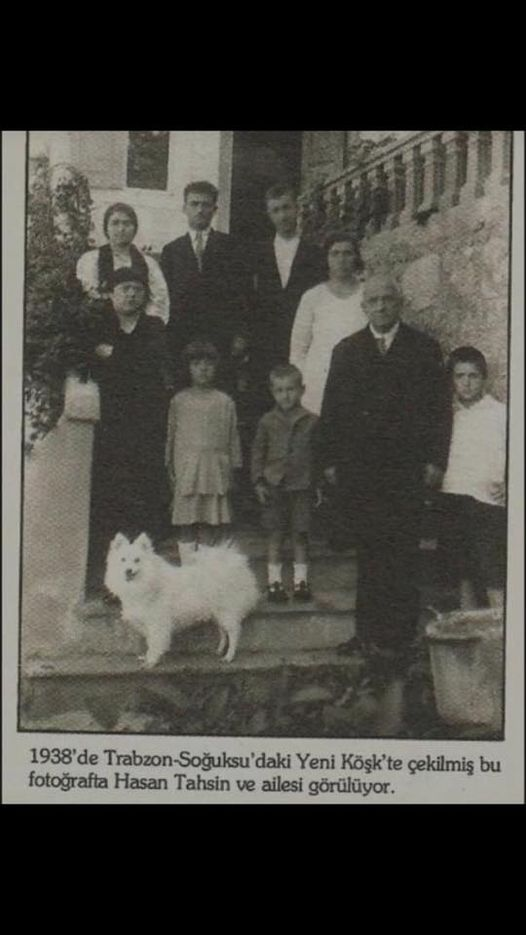
A Tonya Finosu pictured with family in 1938

Tonya Finosu are not recognized by any major Kennel Club. However, efforts are underway to register the breed with the Turkish Patent and Trademark Office as a geographic trademark for the Trabzon District.

== Characteristics ==
Tonya Finosu are small dogs with erect ears and curved, half-moon shaped tails. White is the only acceptable color of this dog. They have a thick, double coat, able to withstand cold, rainy conditions along the Black Sea.

Tonya Finosu are playful and lively with their family and other animals of their household. They are high energy and athletic dogs. With strangers, they are vocal watchdogs.
