= Greek Shepherd =

Greek Shepherd - Hellinikos Pimenikos
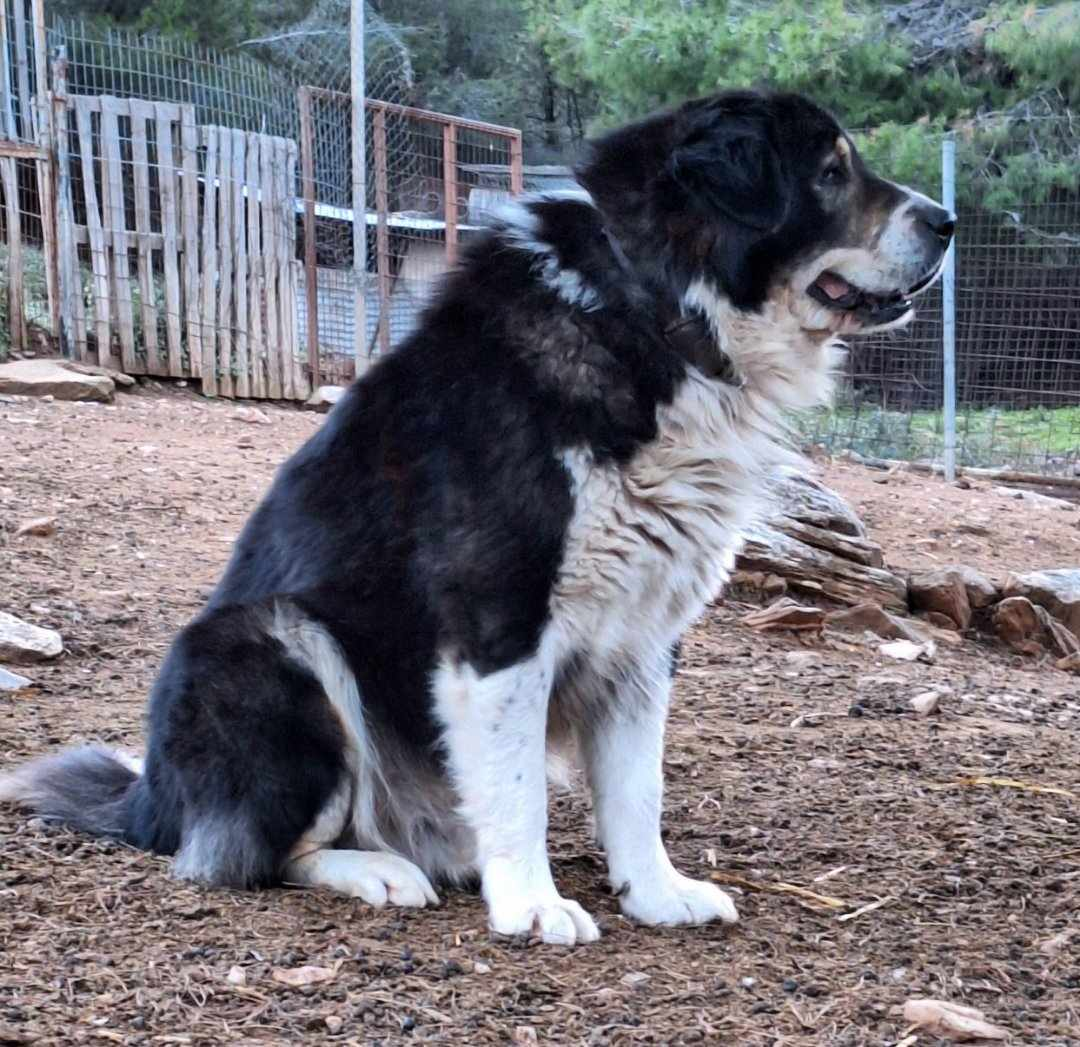
- Male in livestock, from breeder: Parnassus Dogs Farm
- Other names: Ελληνικός Ποιμενικός; Greek Sheepdog
- Origin: Greece
Traits
Height	Males	66–81 cm (26–32 in)
	Females	60–78 cm (24–31 in)
Weight	Males	40–84 kg (88–185 lb)
	Females	32–70 kg (71–154 lb)
- Coat: Dense double coat
- Colour: Black, brown, white and multi-coloured
Kennel club standards
- Kennel Club of Greece: standard

Molossus of Epirus
- Other names: Μολοσσός Ηπείρου
Traits
Height	Males	66–81 cm (26–32 in)
	Females	64–78 cm (25–31 in)
- Colour: Solid red, blonde, yellow, black, striped, wolf or deer colour; possible minimal patch of white on the chest
Kennel club standards
- Kennel Club of Greece: standard

The Greek Shepherd or Greek Sheepdog (Greek: Ελληνικός Ποιμενικός, Ellinikós Pimenikós) is a breed of livestock guardian dog from Greece. Thought to be ancient in origin, the Greek Shepherd is very closely related to livestock guardian dog breeds from neighbouring countries; some dogs are believed to be simultaneously claimed to be other breeds as they migrate annually across national borders with the flocks they protect in search of seasonal pastures.

== History ==
Livestock guardian dogs are thought to be some of the oldest distinct dog types, with evidence the type has remained largely unchanged since ancient times. The Greek Shepherd is claimed to have been found in Greece since ancient times; Plato wrote of dogs of similar form and function being known in the region of Epirus as early as 800 BC. The Greek Shepherd is known as the Ellinikós Pimenikós (Ελληνικός Ποιμενικός) in Greek, it has been called the Greek Shepherd Dog, the Greek Sheepdog, and the Hellenic Shepherd Dog. The breed is found throughout Greece, particularly in the north of the country; it is very closely related to other livestock guardian breeds found throughout the Balkans.

Many Balkan shepherds and their flocks undertake an annual migration between Greece and the Šar Mountains to capitalise on summer mountain pastures but avoid the harsh, snow-covered mountain winters when no feed is available; in 1977, an estimated over 500,000 sheep made this annual migration. Because these same dogs can be seen in multiple countries at different times of the years, some cynologists, including Raymond Coppinger, observe that many dogs claimed to be Greek Shepherd are in fact also claimed to be Šarplaninacs and other regional breeds, and that nationalistic kennel clubs have given separate identities and breed standards to the very same dogs, differing appearances being due to changing appearance of these dogs as they gain their heavier winter coats and shed them again for the heat of the summer. Typically, these shepherds winter their flocks in Greece where their Greek Shepherds protect the flocks from Greek wolves and jackals; then as the weather improves, they walk with their flocks, accompanied by their dogs, over 480 km (300 mi) through North Macedonia to their summer pastures in the Šar Mountains on the border of Albania and Kosovo, where their Šarplaninacs protect their flocks from predators found there. Then in the autumn, they make the return journey to Greece, where their dogs once again transform into Greek Shepherds.

== Description ==
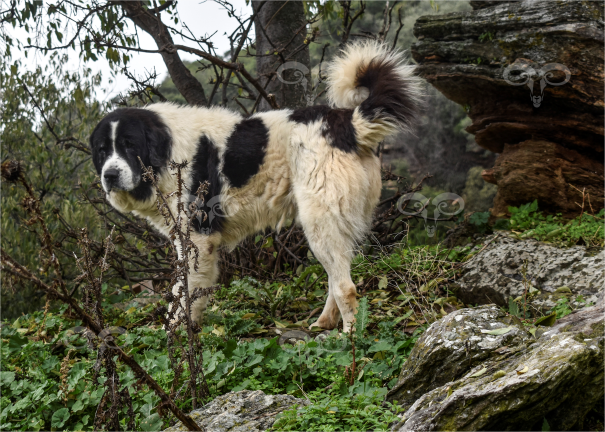
Male on the mountain

=== Appearance ===
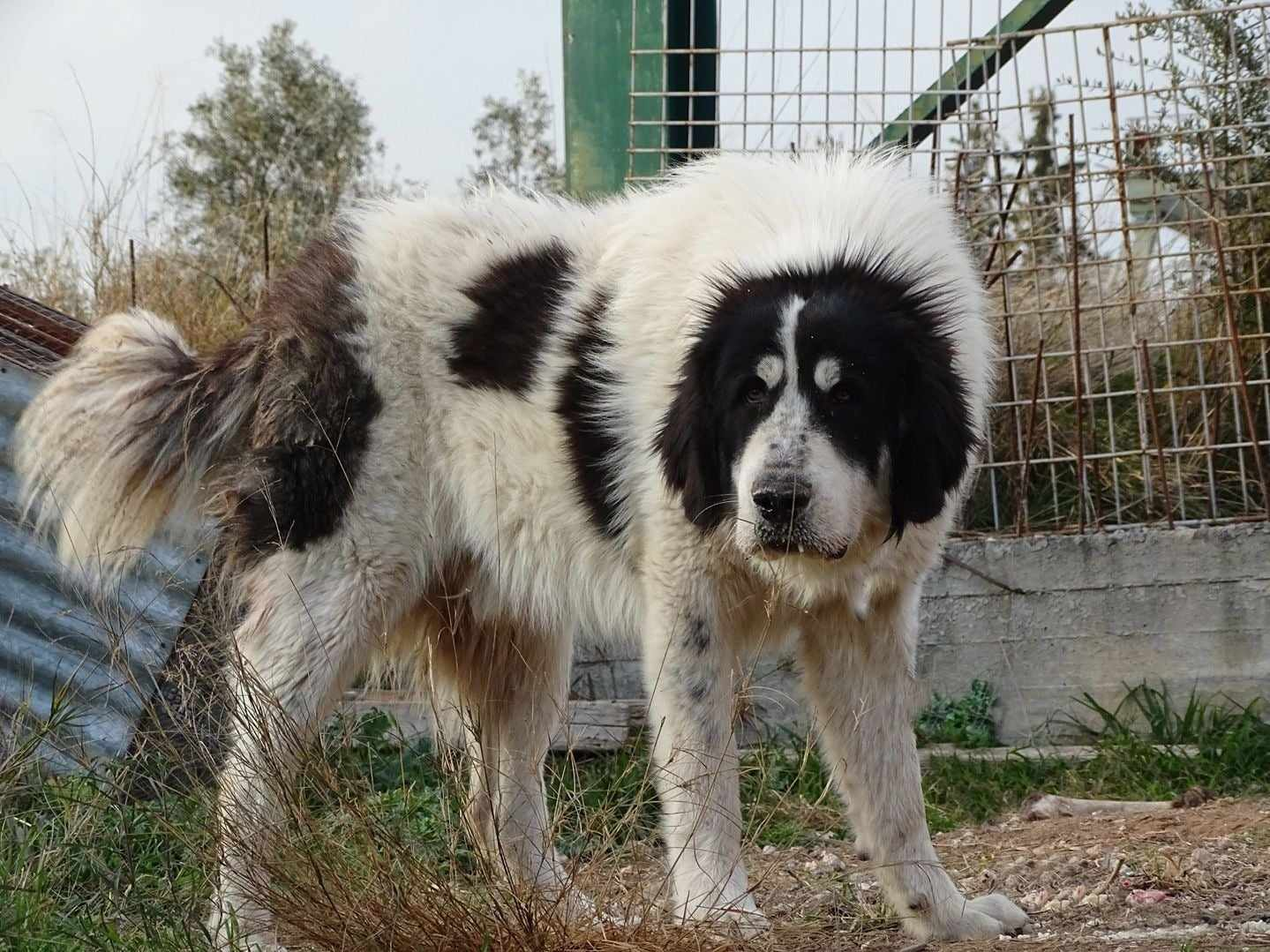
Male dog, from breeder: Agrapha Mountain Guards

The Greek Shepherd is a large breed of dog that closely resembles the Italian Maremmano-Abruzzese Sheepdog, the Hungarian Kuvasz, and the Polish Tatra Shepherd Dog; the breed displays the traits common to most livestock guardian dog breeds, including a thick, weatherproof, double-coat and a powerful build. The Kennel Club of Greece's breed standard states dogs should stand over 66 cm (26 in) at the withers and reportedly, they can stand as much as 81 cm (32 in) tall; and bitches should be over 60 cm (24 in) tall but can attain heights of 78 cm (31 in). The male dogs typically weigh between 40 and 84 kg (88 and 185 lb) and bitches between 32 and 70 kg (71 and 154 lb).

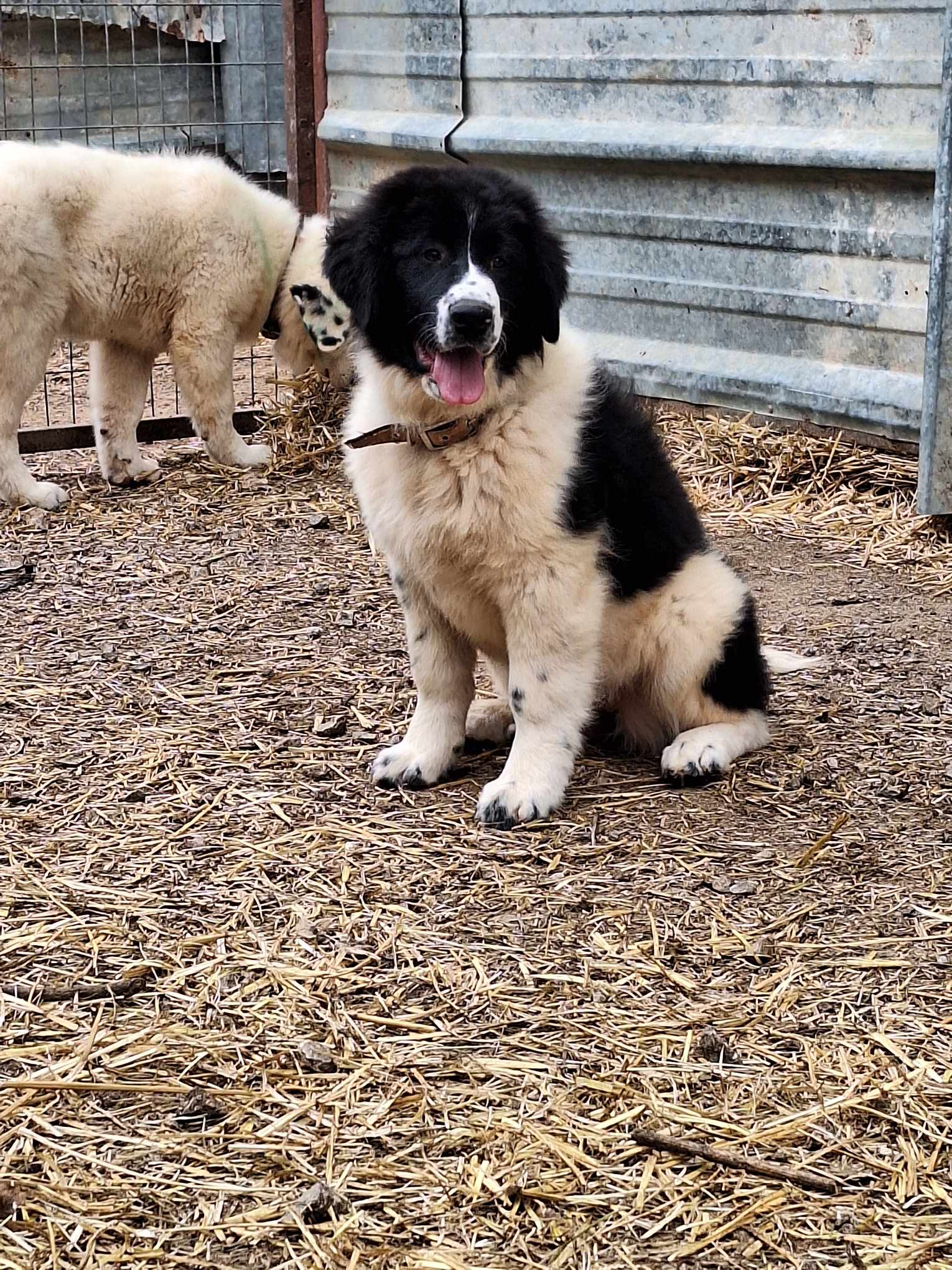
Doukisa from Parnassus Dogs Farm, Greek Livestock Guardian puppy

The breed has a dense, double-coat; it has never been bred for colour and can be found in a broad range of colours, including white, black, brown, light brown, or a combination of these, with spotted examples being common. In some areas, only pure white examples are kept by local shepherds, with nonwhite puppies being culled because they are though to bring bad luck.

In former times, many Greek shepherds would crop the right ear of their dogs, believing doing so improved the dogs' hearing; this practice gave the dogs a curious, lopsided appearance.

=== Character ===
The breed is renowned for its ferocity when guarding flocks, with dogs sometimes taking it upon themselves to protect the whole countryside as opposed to their master's flocks; people walking in some rural areas, even shepherds, often needed to arm themselves with sticks and rocks to ward off shepherd dogs that could mistake them for thieves. A heavy log is often tied to the collars of particularly aggressive animals, being believed the extra exertion curbs the animal's zealotry.

== Molossus of Epirus ==
The Kennel Club of Greece recognises a second breed of Greek livestock guardian dog, the Molossus of Epirus, from the region of Epirus. The kennel club's breed standard for the Molossus of Epirus describes a breed with very similar characteristics as the Greek Shepherd; the principle differences are in colour, it stating the Molossus of Epirus should be solid red, blonde, yellow, or black, striped, and wolf or deer colour with a minimal patch of white on the chest. Additionally, it states bitches are only slightly smaller than dogs, standing between 64 and 74 cm (25 and 29 in).

== See also ==
- List of dog breeds
