= Argentine polar dog =

Extinct dog breed

The Argentine polar dog is an extinct breed of dog. It was created by the Argentine Army to haul freight around its bases in Antarctica. The breed was a cross between a Spitz, which were traditionally used as sled dogs, and several other breeds, including the Alaskan Malamute, the Siberian Husky, the Greenland Dog, and the Samoyed. The practice of breeding Argentine polar dogs came to an end in 1991, when Article 4 of the Antarctic Treaty forced the removal of all non-native species from the continent.

== Origins ==
The origins of the Argentine polar dog can be traced back to 1949, when Colonel Hernán Pujato approached President Juan Perón with a proposal that sought to bring Argentina closer to its Antarctic territorial claims by establishing the Instituto Antártico Argentino and other science-oriented bases with year-round populations. Perón's interest led to Pujato visiting North America and taking a "Polar Survival Course" required by the United States Army in both Alaskan and Greenlandic territories. There, he learned about efficient methods of survival, construction and transportation. On that trip, he gathered 40 dogs, which he brought with him to the Antarctica. These dogs were selectively bred to create the Argentine polar dog. On 21 March 1951, the San Martín Base was established as the first base below the Antarctic Circle. The Argentine polar dog became a key piece in the logistics of the Argentinian presence on the continent.

== Temperament and behavior ==
A wide spectrum of temperaments were reported within the breed; while some individuals showed great tolerance and compassion towards each other, others were prone to fighting and aggression. Generally, Argentine polar dogs were loyal and tender to their human masters, but more aggressive around other dogs. Fights between Argentine polar dogs were reported to be particularly violent, usually culminating in the death or severe injury of one or both dogs involved. The moment a dog went down, others in the pack would surround it and attack it, with a tendency to bite the lower abdomen and the genital area with powerful jaws.

Hauling heavy freight was their strength and they frequently expressed eagerness to do it. Explorers and personnel who have worked side by side with the dogs have reported that the dogs have an innate sense that allowed them to detect obstacles that were invisible to the human eye, such as cracks and holes in the ground that were covered by thin ice or frost. Without being commanded, the dogs would stray from the planned path to avoid any unseen obstacles and return to the path once it was safe.

To communicate, the Argentine polar dog mostly used a prolonged and high-pitched howl that reached great distances. One dog would usually howl once, to which its companions would respond in a chorus, howling in return and stopping all at once with a remarkable sense of timing.

== Care and work ==
Different variables were kept in mind when overseeing the feeding and care of the dogs. Army veterinarians had to take into consideration each dog's particular condition and needs to ensure the animal's longevity and optimal performance. The variables that caretakers considered included, but were not limited to, rest periods, pregnancy, gastrointestinal issues, and dog's last activity and its duration. The time of the year and the surrounding temperatures also had to be considered, as the harsh winters took a bigger toll on their health.

Dogs were initially fed exclusively with a balanced feed called Pemmican. This was a concentrated, dried and hyper-caloric food that accounted for 5000 calories per serving. Over time, Pemmican began to be supplemented by and/or mixed with seal meat, which was greatly enjoyed by the dogs and provided extra calories that helped them remain strong. Nonetheless, the meat was never meant to replace Pemmican, and some dogs became sluggish if their feed is a third or even a quarter seal meat in relation. Feeding the dogs seal meat proved to be counterproductive, since some animals would reject Pemmican in favor of meat, which often led to digestive issues when consumed in great quantities. Later on, these dogs would have trouble readopting Pemmican as their primary source of food.

A well-trained Argentine polar dog was expected to have a working day of approximately 8 to 9 hours, hauling a weight similar to their own at a moderate pace, depending on the terrain. Dogs were trained to obey their master's voice rather than a whip or a similar striking object. The most intelligent dog in each pack would be appointed to take the lead after each command. Behind this individual, dogs would be paired in yokes, called "first yoke", "second yoke", "third yoke" and "stem yoke". The sleds were pulled by an uneven number of dogs which, depending on the freight, could total 7, 9, or 13.

== Appearance ==
Due to their genetic similarities, the Argentine polar dog looked strikingly similar to the dog breeds from which it was derived and which were being used for the same purposes on the opposite side of the globe. A well-rounded animal, it stood at 50–60 cm (19.5–23.5 in) tall. Males reached a weight of around 60 kg (130 lb), while females remained at around 52 kg (115 lb). Their heads resembled those of Malamutes, with small and straight ears, with dark brows over light blue eyes. The tails were arched over their backs, which helped to provide an additional protection from the cold as they rested, bent over their bodies and reaching their faces. Their fur was a blend of light brown, white, black, and grey. Their fur was built and layered to retain heat and fight the extremely low temperatures to which the dogs were constantly exposed. The polar dogs' fur was composed of complex follicles that formed three layers, which included the main visible fur, as well as a cotton-like, dense undercoat that integrated the second and third layers.

== Extinction ==
In August 1991, the Protocol on Environmental Protection to the Antarctic Treaty required that all parties with territorial pretensions remove any fauna or flora they had introduced to the continent by 1 April 1994. That year, as a member of the Antarctic Treaty, Argentina relocated all 22 dogs living in the San Martín Base to a corps of the Argentine National Gendarmerie in Puente del Inca, in Mendoza. In February 1993, the last 13 dogs remaining on the continent, stationed at the Esperanza Base, were relocated to another corps of the Argentine National Gendarmerie in the city of Ushuaia, in Tierra del Fuego.

Most of these individuals perished shortly after arriving in a continent that was new to them. Given the geographical isolation they had lived in since their conception as a breed, the dogs had no immunity against the diseases that were common among dogs in populated areas. The authorities responsible for the dogs' care failed to anticipate this issue. This made it impossible to continue any breeding program, and soon the entire breed had died out.
