= Šarplaninac =

Breed of dog

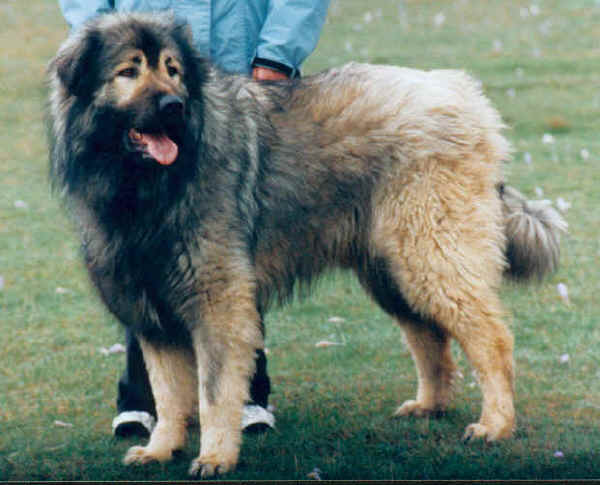
- Other names: Ilirski Ovčar; Illyrian Shepherd Dog; Jugoslovenski Ovčarski Pas – Šarplaninac; Yugoslavian Shepherd Dog – Sharplanina; Jugoslovenski Ovčarski Pas; Yugoslavian Shepherd Dog; Sarplaninac; Sharplanina
- Origin: former Yugoslavia; North Macedonia; Serbia; Kosovo
- Distribution: Šar Mountains
Traits
Height	Males	62 cm (24 in)
	Females	58 cm (23 in)
Weight	Males	35–45 kg (75–100 lb)
	Females	30–40 kg (65–90 lb)
- Coat: double; guard hair long, flat and coarse, undercoat thick and fine
- Colour: any solid colour, without white markings; iron grey or dark grey preferred
Kennel club standards
- Kinološki Savez Republike Srbije: standard
- Fédération Cynologique Internationale: standard

The Šarplaninac (Note: Serbian: шарпланинац, romanized: šarplaninac; Macedonian: шарпланинец, romanized: šarplaninec; colloquially also Šarac, Serbian: шарац, romanized: šarac; Macedonian: шарец, romanized: šarec) or Sharr dog (Note: Albanian: qeni i Sharrit) is a breed of dog of livestock guardian type. It is named for the Šar Mountains or Šar Planina range in the Balkans, where it is principally found. It was recognised by the Fédération Cynologique Internationale as the Illyrian Shepherd Dog or Ilirski Ovčar (Note: Serbian: илирски овчар, romanized: ilirski ovčar; Macedonian: илирски овчар, romanized: ilirski ovčar; Albanian: deltari Ilir) from 1939 until 1957, when the name was changed to Yugoslavian Shepherd Dog – Sharplanina or Jugoslovenski Ovčarski Pas – Šarplaninac. (Note: The Socialist Federal Republic of Yugoslavia broke up in 1991–1992)

In Ottoman times, the dogs moved with the flocks of sheep, spending the summer in the area of the Šar Mountains and the winter in Thessaly, where they were known as Greek Shepherd Dogs.

== History ==
Šarplaninac service dogs of the Royal Yugoslav Army

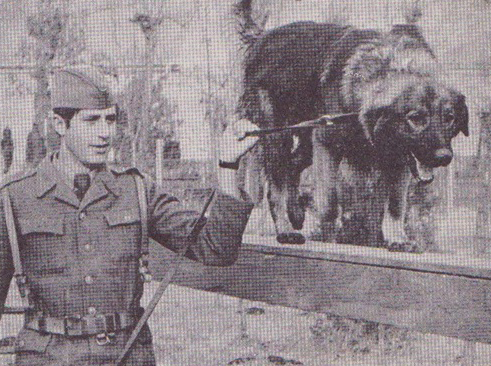
Training of Šarplaninac in Yugoslav People's Army

The origins of the Šarplaninac are not known. It was traditionally used to guard cattle or sheep. In the transhumant system of management, livestock was moved twice a year, to the high mountain pastures for the summer, and to the warmer plains for the winter. In the southern Balkans, very large numbers of sheep were moved in this way, accompanied by men and dogs. In Ottoman times, dogs of this type moved with the flocks of sheep, spending the summer in the area of the Šar Mountains and the winter in Thessaly – where they were known as 'Greek Shepherd Dogs'.

In 1939 it was recognised by the Fédération Cynologique Internationale as a Yugoslav breed with the name 'Ilirski Ovčar' or 'Illyrian Shepherd Dog'; In 1957, following a request from the Yugoslav Federation of Cynology (Jugoslovenski Kinološki Savez), the Fédération Cynologique Internationale agreed to change the official international names of the breed to 'Jugoslovenski Ovcarski Pas – Sarplaninac' and 'Yugoslavian Shepherd Dog – Sharplanina'. In 1968 the Kraški Ovčar or Karst Shepherd Dog, which had previously been considered a sub-type, was recognised as a separate breed.

Breed numbers were much reduced by the conflicts associated with the breakup of Yugoslavia in the 1990s. Following these events, the Fédération Cynologique Internationale recognised North Macedonia and Serbia as the countries of origin.

The Šarplaninac is found mainly in the Šar Mountains, where it is thought to have originated and from which the name 'Šarplaninac' derives. It is also distributed in the areas of the Jablanica, Korab and Pelister mountains.

== Characteristics ==
The Šarplaninac is a large and strongly built dog: dogs weigh some 35–45 kg, bitches about 5 kg less. The average height at the withers is 62 cm for dogs and 58 cm for bitches.

The dogs may be expected to live for some 11–13 years.

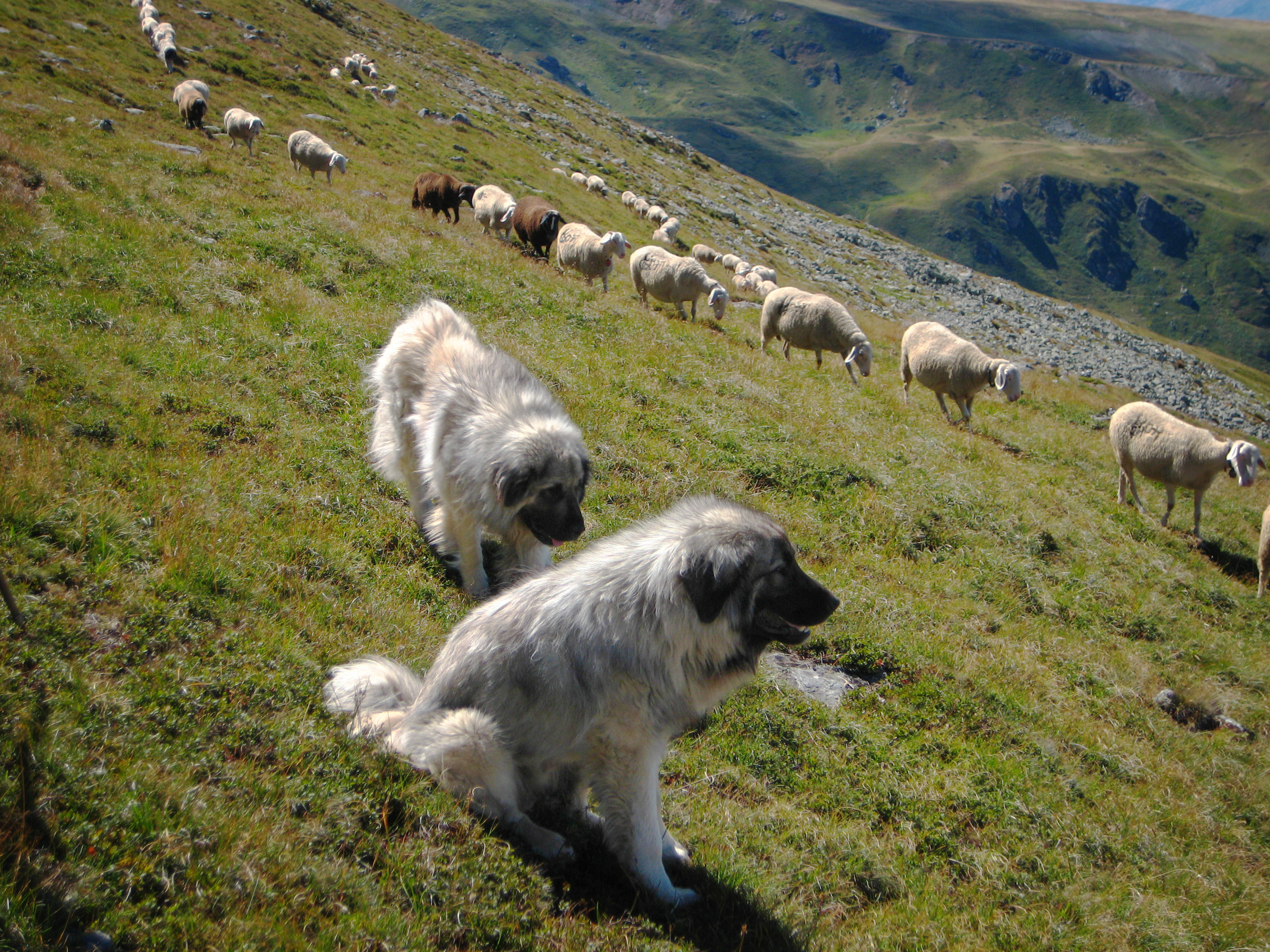
Guarding sheep near Lake Peak in Kosovo

== Legislation ==
The Šarplaninac is on the list of banned dog breeds in Denmark. The Danish list includes 13 breeds and it is considered controversial, having received criticism from dog owners and several political parties because eight of the 13 breeds have no reports of any incident. Among the eight is Šarplaninac.

It is viewed on the one Macedonian denar coin.
