= List of Spanish dog breeds =

Twelve Spanish dog breeds are recognised by both the Fédération Cynologique Internationale and by the Real Sociedad Canina de España, and a further twelve by the Real Sociedad alone. The society also lists nine breeds that have regional recognition from one of the Autonomous Communities of Spain and three grupos étnicos caninos, which the society defines as a regional dog population with consistent form and function evolved through functional selection. Other breeds are seeking, or are in the process of obtaining, recognition.

Local names	English name if used	Recognition	Notes	Image
Alano Español		RSCE		
Ca de Conills			Menorca	
Ca Mè Mallorquí		regional recognition, Balearic Islands		
Ca Rater Mallorquí		regional recognition, Balearic Islands		
Can de Chira				
Can de Palleiro		regional recognition, Galicia		
Carea Castellano-Manchego		RSCE, grupos étnicos caninos		
Erbi Txakur			País Vasco	
Galgo Español		FCI; RSCE		
Guicho; Can Guicho; Quisquelo		regional recognition, Galicia		
Lobito Herreño; Perro de Pastor Herreño		RSCE, grupos étnicos caninos		
Maneto		RSCE		
Mastín del Pirineo	Pyrenean Mastiff	FCI; RSCE		
Mastín Español		FCI; RSCE		
Pachón Navarro		RSCE		
Perdigueiro Galego		regional recognition, Galicia		
Perdiguero de Burgos		FCI; RSCE		
Perro de Agua del Cantábrico		regional recognition, Cantabria		
Perro de Agua Español		FCI; RSCE		
Catalan Sheepdog; Gos d'Atura Català		FCI; RSCE		
Perro de Pastor Garafiano		RSCE		
Perro de Pastor Mallorquín; Ca de Bestiar	Majorca Shepherd Dog; Majorca Sheepdog	FCI; RSCE		
Perro de Pastor Vasco; Euskal Artzain Txakurra		RSCE		
Perro de Presa Mallorquín; Dogo Mallorquín; Ca de Bou		FCI; RSCE		
Perro de punta español	Old Spanish Pointer		extinct	
Perro Leonés de Pastor; Carea Leonés		RSCE		
Perro Majorero		RSCE		
Podenco Andaluz	Andalusian Warren Hound; Andalusian Podenco	RSCE		
Podenco Canario		FCI; RSCE		
Podenco Galego		regional recognition, Galicia		
Podenco Ibicenco; Ca Eivissenc		FCI; RSCE		
Podenco Orito Español		RSCE, grupos étnicos caninos		
Podenco Paternino		regional recognition, Andalucia		
Podenco Valenciano		RSCE		
Presa Canario		FCI; RSCE		
Ratonero Bodeguero Andaluz		RSCE		
Ratonero Valenciano; Gos Rater Valencià		FCI; RSCE		
Sabueso Español		FCI; RSCE		
Valdueza		RSCE		
Villano de Las Encartaciones		regional recognition, País Vasco		
Villanuco de Las Encartaciones		regional recognition, Cantabria and País Vasco		
