= Ca de Conills =

Spanish breed of dog

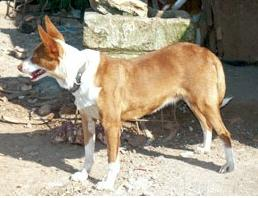
- Other names: Ca de Conills de Menorca; Can de Conejos de Menorca
- Origin: Spain
- Distribution: Menorca, Balearic Islands
Traits
- Height: Small: about 30 cm; Medium: 40–50 cm; Large: 60–70 cm
- Notes: not recognised in Spanish legislation

The Ca de Conills is a Spanish breed of warren hound indigenous to the island of Menorca, in the Balearic Islands of Spain.

It is the least-known of the six dog breeds listed by the government of the islands; the others are the Ca de Bestiar, the Ca de Bou, the Ca Eivissenc, the Ca Mè Mallorquí and the Ca Rater Mallorquí. It is of variable size, and – like some other warren hound breeds such as the Podenco Andaluz – is divided into three sub-breeds: small, medium and large.

== History ==
The Ca de Conills is the traditional warren hound of the island of Menorca. Until the mid-twentieth century it was extensively used for rabbit-hunting – without guns, and often on a large scale. When myxomatosis reached the Balearic Islands in 1952, the number of rabbits fell, rabbit-hunting became less common, and numbers of the dogs also decreased. In 2024 a census total of 316 animals was reported.

The Ca de Conills is recognised by the government of the Balearic Islands as an agrupació racial ('breed grouping'); it is not recognised by the Real Sociedad Canina de España, by the Fédération Cynologique Internationale or by the national government of Spain. The breed society is the Associació de Criadors i Conservadors de Ca de Conills de Menorca, in the town of Ferreries, in central Menorca. There is no breed standard.

In the twenty-first century it is at risk both from changes in the population of wild rabbit and from the consequences of imports to the islands of warren hounds of other Mediterranean breeds.

== Characteristics ==
The Ca de Conills has been selectively bred by hunters for its hunting abilities and not for morphological characteristics, and so constitutes a highly variable population. It is of variable size, and – like some other warren hound breeds such as the Podenco Andaluz – is divided into three sub-breeds: small, medium and large. Heights at the withers are approximately 30 cm for the small group, 40–50 cm for the medium and 60–70 cm for the large.

The coat varies from about 2 to 5 cm in length. The most common coat colour is tan with white markings, seen in about two-thirds of all dogs; black and black-and-white are rare.

== Use ==
As in the past, the dogs are used in their traditional rôle, hunting rabbit in the rocky terrain of the island. They hunt using a combination of scent, sight and hearing. Groups of dogs of all three sizes are used together, each carrying out the task to which it is best suited.
