= Mallorca (disambiguation) =

Mallorca or Majorca is a Balearic Island, part of Spain, located in the Mediterranean Sea.

Mallorca and Majorca may also refer to:

- Kingdom of Majorca (1231–1344), encompassing the Balearic Islands and parts of the Iberian Peninsula
- Battle of Mallorca (August 16–September 12, 1936), in the Spanish Civil War
- Majorca, Victoria, an Australian ghost town
- Majorca Building, building in Melbourne, Australia built 1928–1930
- Mallorca (Vino de la Tierra), a wine from Majorca
- Mallorca cheese
- RCD Mallorca, a football team from the island
- Bàsquet Mallorca, a former basketball team from the island
- Mallorca (Albéniz), a composition by Isaac Albéniz
- Mallorca – Suche nach dem Paradies or Mallorca, a 1999–2000 German soap opera
- Anisado Mallorca, or simply "Mallorca", a variant of anise liqueur from the Philippines

== See also ==
- Mallorcan dialect of Catalan
- Mallorquín (Spanish for 'Mallorcan'), rare horse breed native to Mallorca
- Mallorquí (surname)

Dog breeds

- Majorca Mastiff
- Majorca Ratter
- Majorca Shepherd Dog
