= Valdueza =

Spanish breed of dog

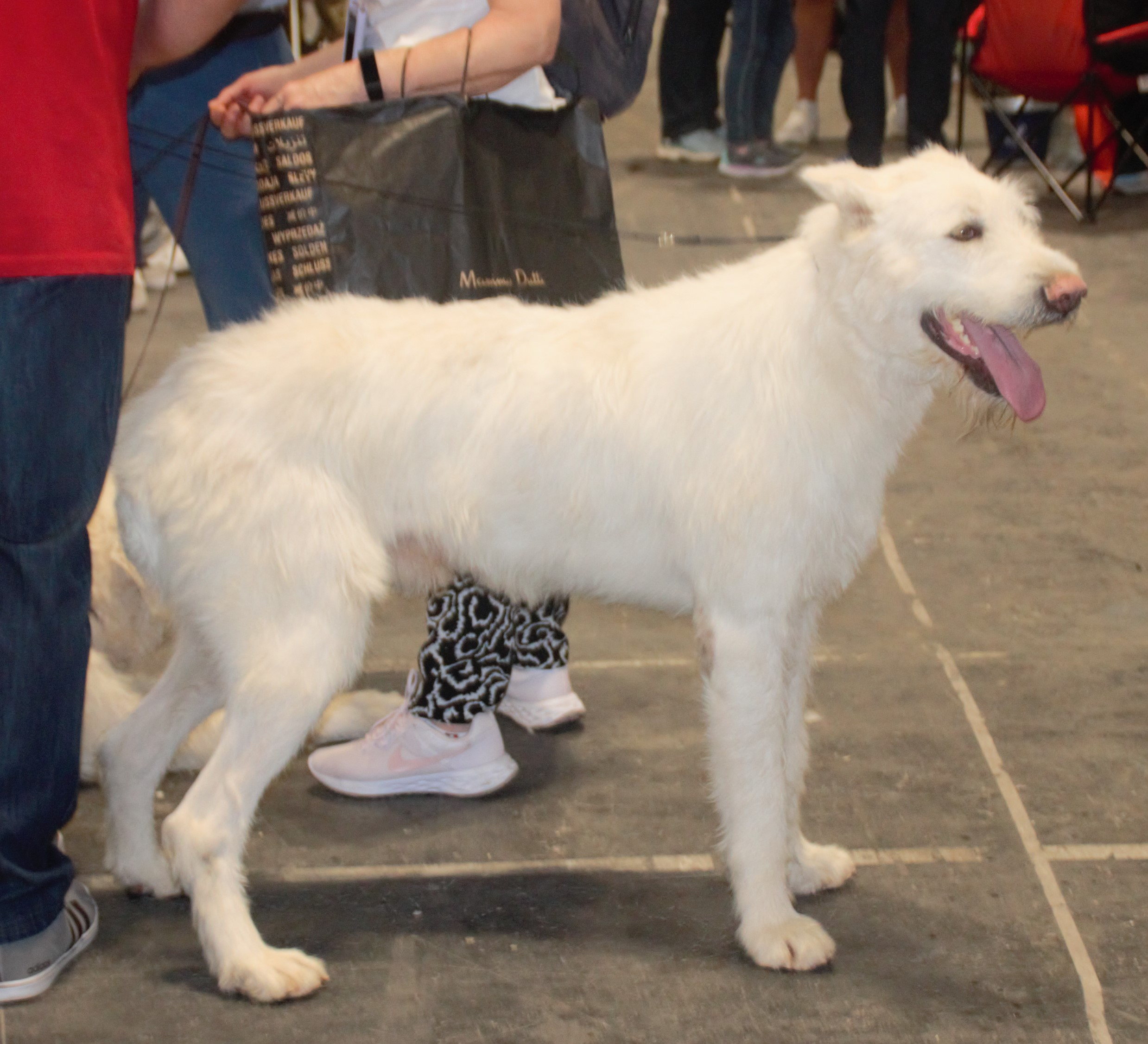
- Other names: Perro Montero Valdueza
- Origin: Spain
Traits
Height	Males	67–75 cm (26–30 in)
	Females	66–72 cm (26–28 in)
- Coat: rough, with undercoat
- Colour: white or waxen, sometimes with pale patches
Kennel club standards
- Real Sociedad Canina de España: standard
- Notes: recognised in Spanish national legislation

The Valdueza or Perro Montero Valdueza is a modern Spanish breed of large pack-hound. It results from selective breeding, principally of large rough-haired Podenco Andaluz dogs with lightweight examples of the Mastín Extremeño; some Griffon Vendéen blood was later added. Breeding began in the 1940s; in 2020 the Valdueza was officially recognised by the Ministerio de Agricultura, Pesca y Alimentación, the Spanish ministry of agriculture, and was added to the list of indigenous Spanish breeds. It is not recognised by the Fédération Cynologique Internationale.

== History ==
Breeding of the Valdueza was begun in the 1940s by Alfonso Álvaréz de Toledo y Cabeza de Vaca, the eleventh Marquess of Valdueza, and was continued after his death by his son Alonso Álvarez de Toledo y Urquijo, the twelfth marquess. The aim was always to create a breed of pack-hound suitable for hunting in mountainous terrain, particularly in the Montes de Toledo, the Sierras of Extremadura and the Sierra Morena. To this end large rough-haired dogs of the Podenco Andaluz breed were cross-bred with lightweight examples of the Mastín Extremeño; some Griffon Vendéen blood was later added by Alonso Álvarez de Toledo.

In 2014 the Perro Montero Valdueza was listed among the 'Grupos Étnicos' of the Real Sociedad Canina de España, a preliminary step to full recognition as a breed. In 2020 it was officially recognised by the Ministerio de Agricultura, Pesca y Alimentación, the Spanish ministry of agriculture, and was added to the list of recognised indigenous Spanish breeds.

In 2026 it was among the sixteen Spanish breeds considered by the Real Sociedad Canina de España to be vulnerable.
