= Ca Mè Mallorquí =

Spanish breed of dog

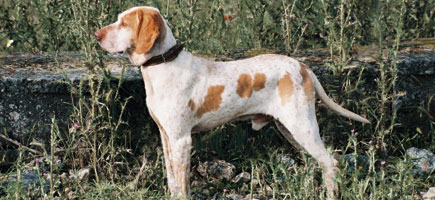
- Other names: Ca Mè
- Origin: Spain (Majorca, Balearic Islands)
Traits
Height	Males	50–60 cm (20–24 in)
	Females	45–55 cm (18–22 in)
Weight	Males	18–23 kg (40–51 lb)
	Females	15–20 kg (33–44 lb)
- Coat: short and smooth
- Colour: solid black, brown, orange or lemon, bicoloured with white or tricoloured
- Notes: recognised under Spanish national law

The Ca Mè Mallorquí is a Spanish breed of pointing dog originating in the Mediterranean island of Mallorca, in the Balearic Islands. It was traditionally used as a pointing dog in hunting. It was officially recognised by the national government of Spain in 2004, but is not recognised by either the Fédération Cynologique Internationale or the Real Sociedad Canina de España.

== History ==
The Ca Mè Mallorquí is native to the island of Mallorca in the Balearic Islands, and is one of several very similar breeds of pointing dog native to Spain, including the Pachón Navarro and the Perdiguero de Burgos. The breed was much used by Majorcan hunters throughout the eighteenth, nineteenth and early twentieth centuries and, as a result of the writings of a number of visiting sportsmen, also gained some degree of international reputation during that period. Though predominantly found on Majorca, it was also common on the island of Menorca in the nineteenth and twentieth centuries.

Breed numbers declined throughout the twentieth century due to the increased use of imported pointing breeds such as the English Pointer and German Shorthaired Pointer, and by the end of the century the Ca Mè was almost extinct.

A breed club, the Club del Ca Mè Mallorquí, was formed in 1995, and in 2002 was recognised by the department of agriculture and fisheries of the Government of the Balearic Islands, which also published the breed standard and established a stud-book for the Ca Mè.

The Ca Mè was officially recognised by the Ministerio de Agricultura, Pesca y Alimentación, the Spanish ministry of agriculture, in 2004; together with the Alano Español, the Pastor Garafiano, the Ratonero Mallorquín and the Ratonero Valenciano, it was added to the list of indigenous Spanish breeds of dog.

In 2019 the breed was estimated to number several hundred, not all of which were registered in the stud-book.

== Characteristics ==
The Ca Mè Mallorquí is of medium size. Dogs usually stand between 50 and 60 cm (20 and 25 in) at the withers, and weigh between 18 and 23 kg (40 and 50 lb); bitches are slightly smaller, typically some 5 cm less in height and 3 kg less in weight. The legs are long and well-muscled, the chest is wide and deep, and the tail and neck are relatively short. The muzzle is straight, with fine dewlaps; the ears are set high, are rounded and of medium size, and hang close to the head.

The coat is dense, short and smooth. It may be any of a wide variety of colours including: solid black or brown; bi-coloured black-and-white, brown-and-white, orange-and-white or lemon-and-white, with mottling or ticking; or tri-coloured.
