= Lobito Herreño =

Spanish breed of dog

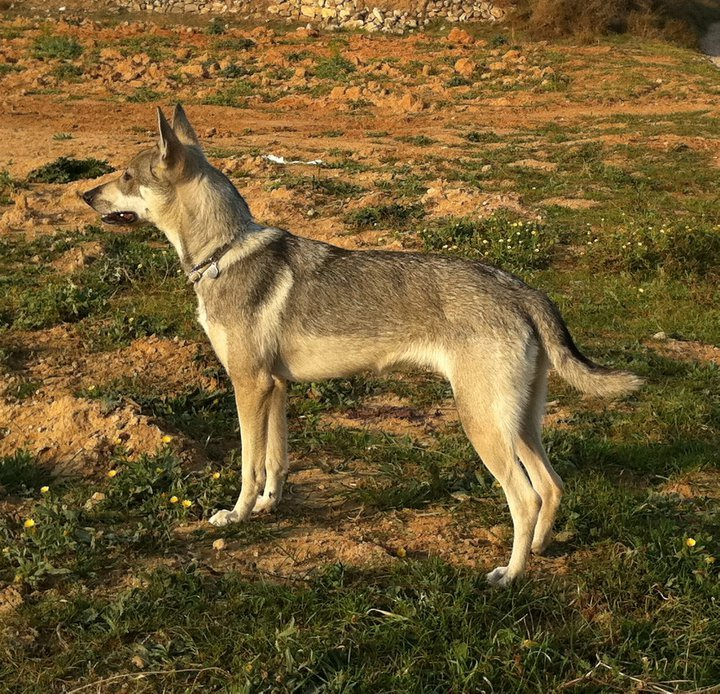
- Other names: Lobo Herreño; Perro de Pastor Herreño
- Origin: El Hierro, Canary Islands, Spain
- Breed status: Not recognised as a breed by any major kennel club.
Traits
Height	Males	54 cm
	Females	52 cm
Weight	Males	22 kg
	Females	18 kg
- Coat: short, thicker in winter
- Colour: usually grey, also reddish, both with pale mask; white or cream permitted
- Notes: listed among Grupos Étnicos Caninos by the Real Sociedad Canina de España

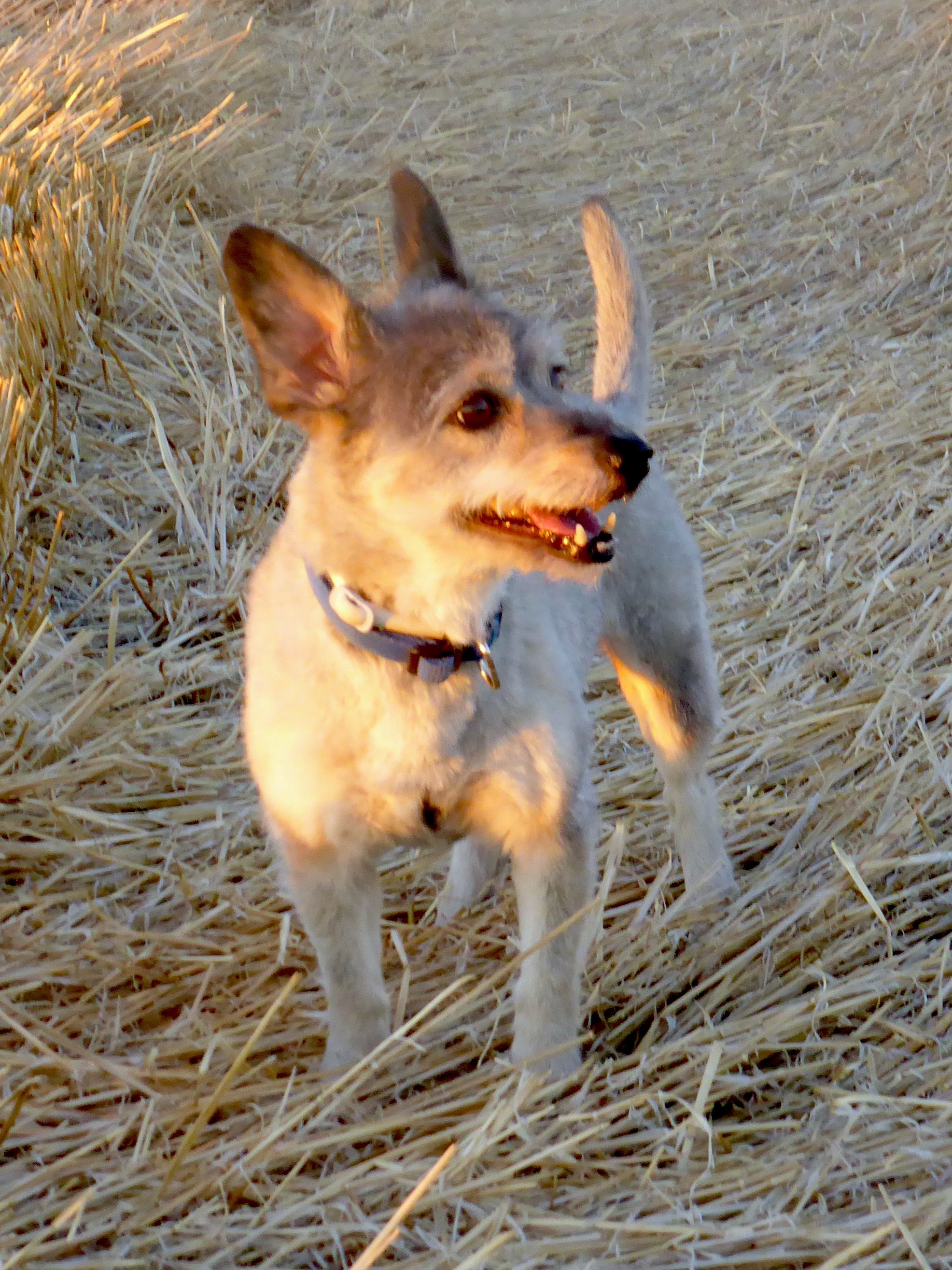
Bitch on El Hierro

The Lobito Herreño or Perro de Pastor Herreño is a Spanish breed or type of pastoral dog. It is found mostly on the island of El Hierro in the Canary Islands, but also on Gran Canaria, La Palma and Tenerife. It is not recognised as breed by the Real Sociedad Canina de España, but in 2021 was one of three breeds or types listed as a grupo étnico canino, which the society defines as a regional dog population with consistent form and function evolved through functional selection. The other two dogs in this group are the Podenco Orito Español and the Carea Castellano-Manchego.

The society published a draft breed standard for the Lobito Herreño in 2013. The breed society is the Asociación para la Recuperación del Perro Lobo Herreño.

== History ==
It is not clear whether or to what extent the modern dogs of the Canary Islands derive from dogs already present in the islands before the arrival of the Castilian conquistadores at the start of the fifteenth century. The origins of the Lobito Herreño are unknown; it is suggested that it derives from dogs brought to the archipelago in or after the eighteenth century. In 2013 the Real Sociedad Canina de España included it on its list of grupos étnicos caninos, which the society defines as a regional dog population with consistent form and function evolved through functional selection; in the same year it published a draft breed standard.

In 2021 the Parliament of the Canary Islands passed a resolution declaring the principal indigenous animal breeds of the islands to be a "cultural, genetic and ethnographic heritage". The text of the resolution included the four internationally-recognised dog breeds of the islands – the Pastor Garafiano, the Perro Majorero, the Presa Canario and the Podenco Canario – but not the Lobito Herreño, although this had been discussed in Parliament.

The Lobito is not the only breed for which recognition is being sought in the Canaries; others are the Podenco Enano, also of El Hierro, and the Ratonero Palmero of La Palma.

== Characteristics ==
The Lobito Herreño is of wolf-like and primitive appearance. It is of medium size, with a height at the withers of some 52–54 cm and weight in the range 18–22 kg according to the draft breed standard. A study in 2009 of fifty-five animals on El Hierro found average heights and weights of 52.6 cm/21.1 kg for bitches and 54.7 cm/21.9 kg for dogs. The coat is usually grey, but may also be reddish, both colours with pale masking round the mouth and eyes; solid white or cream is also permitted, these colours without masking. The tip of the tail is black.

== Use ==
Like other pastoral dogs, it was traditionally used to assist the shepherd with the movement and management of the flock, and was suspicious of strangers but faithful to its master. With the disappearance of the pastoral way of life, it is increasingly kept as a companion dog.
