= Maneto =

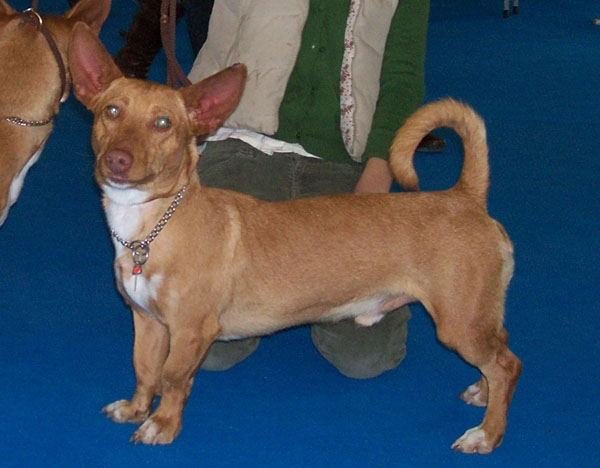
- Origin: Andalusia (Spain)
Traits
- Height: 30 - 35 cm
- Weight: 8.5 - 11.5 kg
- Coat: short, smooth
- Colour: cinnamon or bicolour (cinnamon and white)
Kennel club standards
- RSCFRCE: standard

The Maneto is a dog breed native to Andalusia in Spain. It is derived from the medium-sized Andalusian Hound, and is used to hunt rabbits, partridge, quail, and for retrieving ducks from the water. Its legs are short relative to its body, and its ears are triangular and blunt. The breed is recognised by the name Maneto by the Real Sociedad Canina de España. The word "maneto" in Spanish indicates an impediment or defect in any of the hands or legs.

In 2026 it was among the sixteen Spanish breeds considered by the Real Sociedad Canina de España to be vulnerable.
