= Perro Majorero =

Spanish breed of dog

Majorero
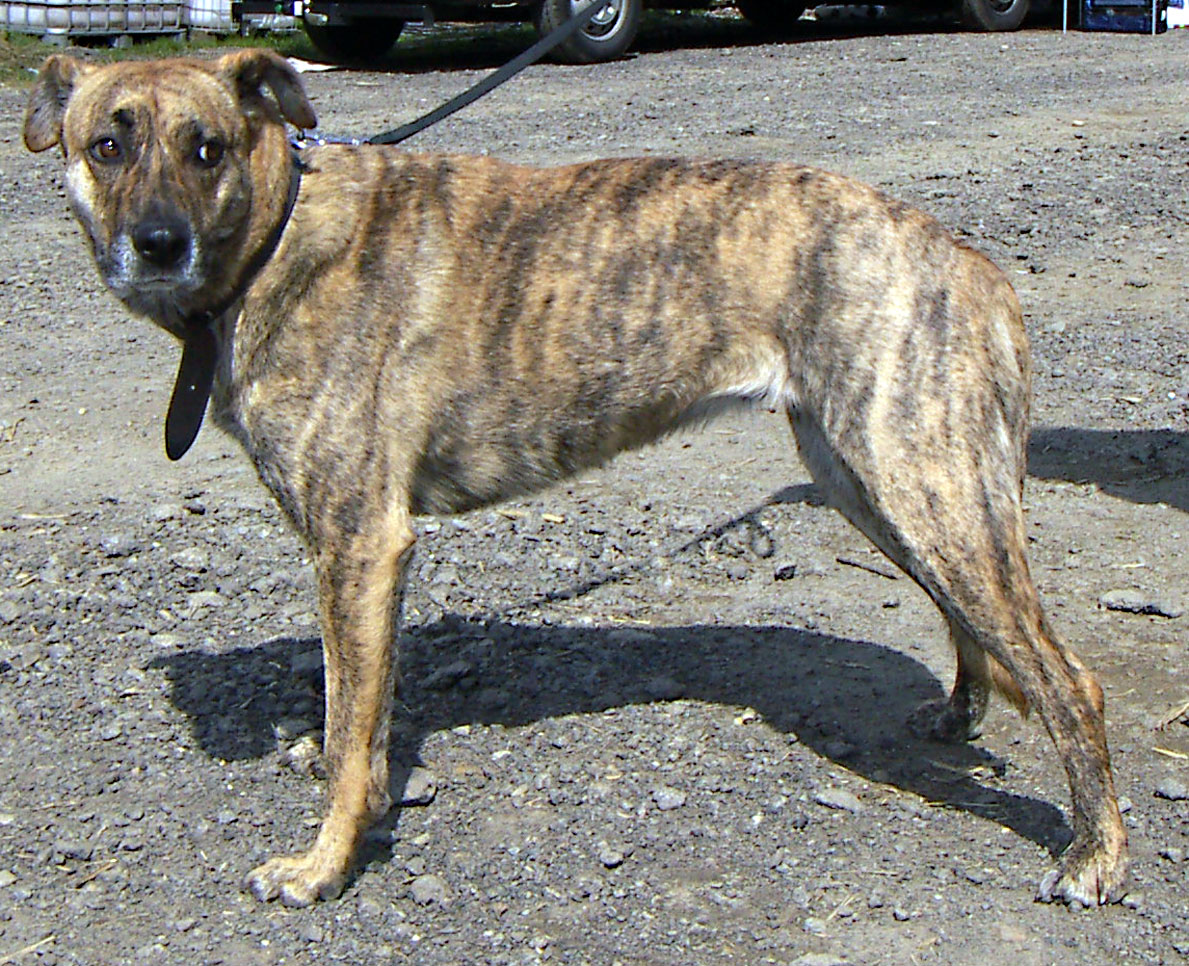

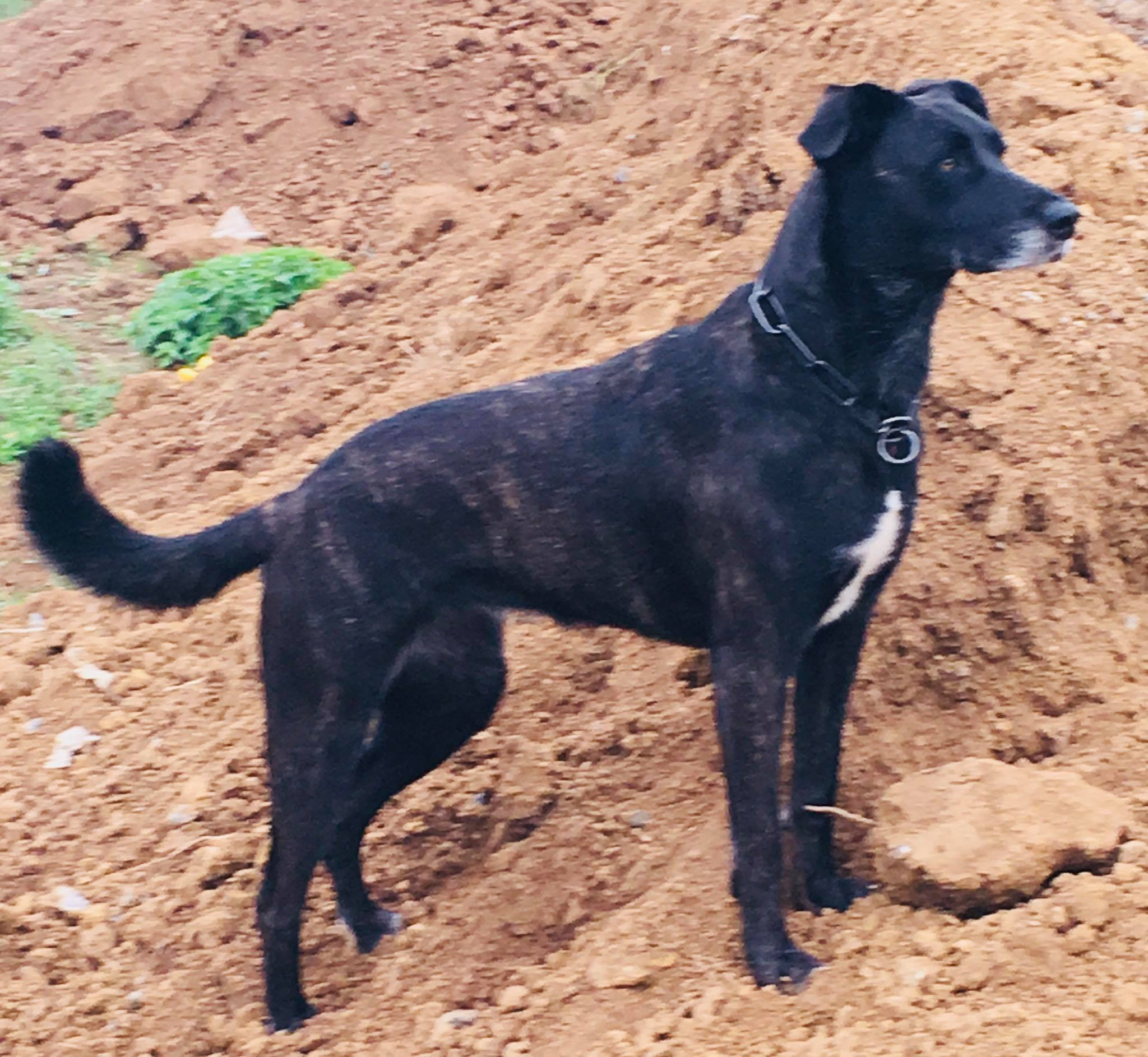
- Other names: Bardino; Majorero Canario; Perro Majorero
- Origin: Spain
- Distribution: Canary Islands
Traits
Height	Males	56-63 cm
	Females	53-61 cm
Weight	Males	30–45 kg
	Females	25–35 kg
Kennel club standards
- Real Sociedad Canina de España: standard
- Notes: recognised in Spanish legislation

The Majorero, also called Bardino or Perro Majorero, is a Spanish breed of herding and guardian dog originating in the island of Fuerteventura in the autonomous region of the Canary Islands. It was recognised by the Real Sociedad Canina de España – the national kennel club of Spain – in April 1994, and by the national government by royal decree in May 2001. The word majorero is a demonym for the people of Fuerteventura.

It is one of five recognised breeds of dog in the Canaries, the others being the Lobito Herreño, the Pastor Garafiano, the Podenco Canario and the Presa Canario.

== History ==
Like many other aspects of the life of the islands, the presence of the Majorero is not recorded in historical documents; efforts to conserve the breed began in the 1970s. Its modern history begins with a single-breed dog show held in 1979 in Gran Tarajal in the municipality of Tuineje on the south-east coast of Fuerteventura, which attracted cynologists and breeders from Spain and elsewhere.

The Majorero was recognised by the Real Sociedad Canina de España – the national kennel club of Spain – in April 1994, and by the Spanish national government by royal decree in May 2001. The word majorero is a demonym for the people of Fuerteventura, related to the caves where ancient peoples lived.

The breed society, the Asociación para la Conservación del Perro Majorero, was authorised by the government of the Canary Islands on the basis of Real Decreto 558/2001, dated 25 May 2001; it is the successor to an earlier society, the Asociación Protectora del Perro Majorero o Bardino, Toto, which had been approved in 1989.

It is estimated that the dogs number a few hundred in all; the breed is not among those listed in 2026 by the Real Sociedad Canina de España as 'vulnerable'.

== Characteristics ==
The Majorero is of medium size: heights at the withers vary from 53 to 61 cm for bitches and 56 to 63 cm for dogs; the corresponding ranges for body weights are 25 to 35 kg and 30 to 45 kg respectively.
