= Ca de Bestiar =

Spanish breed of dog

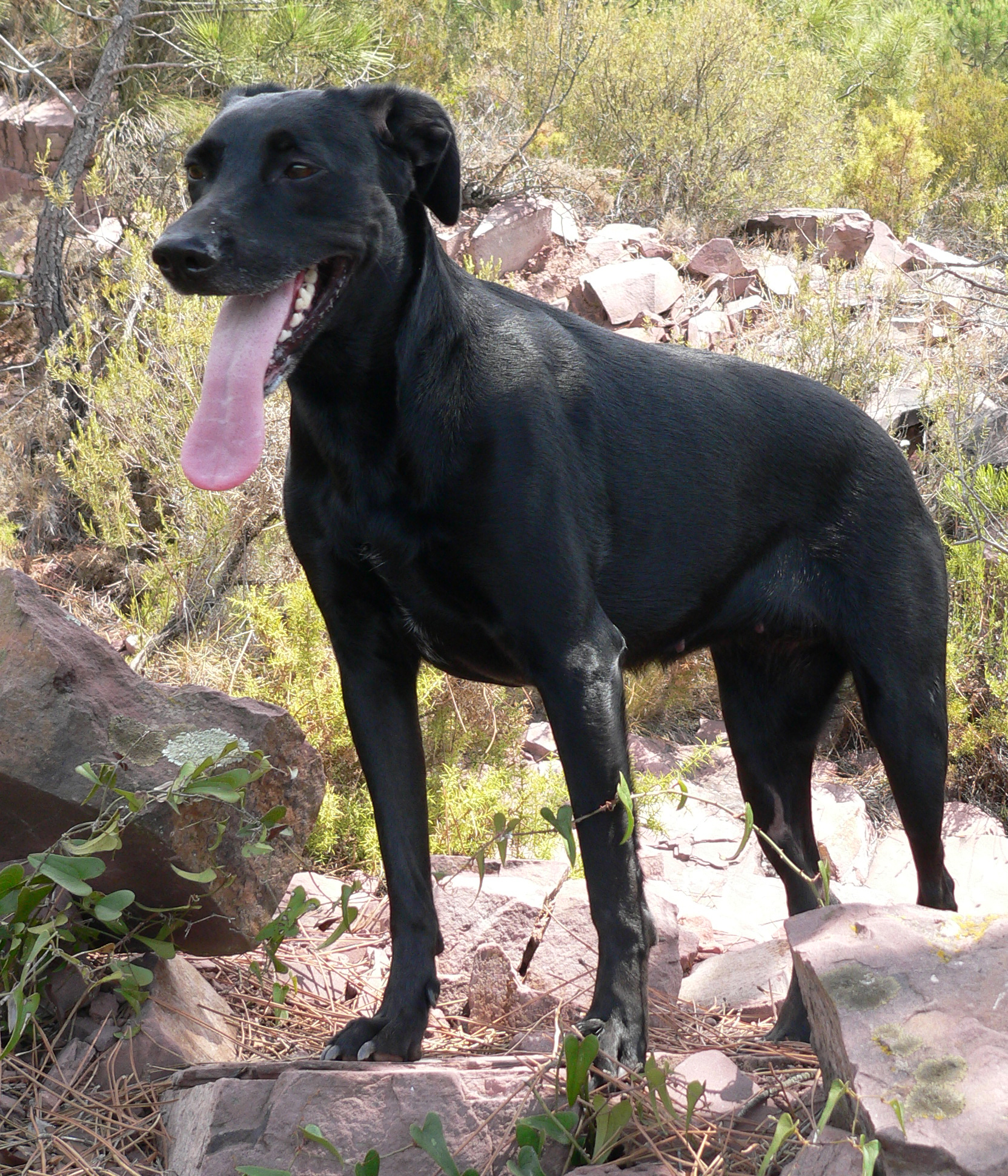

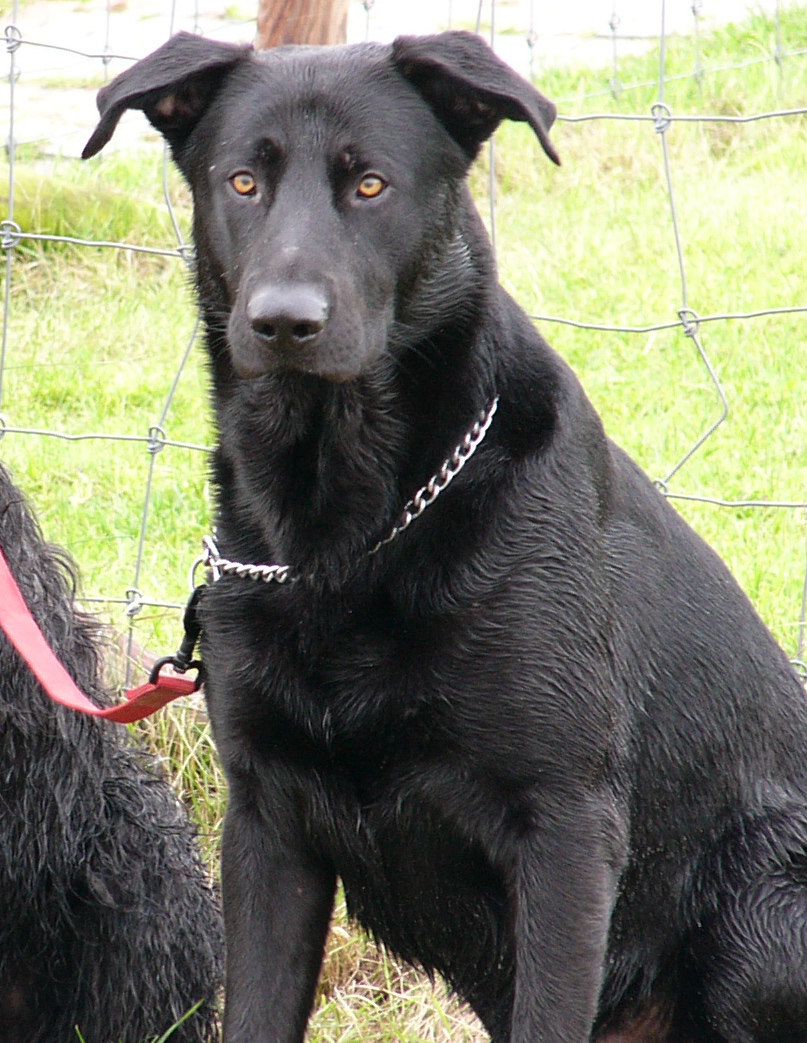
- Other names: Majorca Shepherd Dog; Perro de Pastor Mallorquín
- Origin: Spain
- Distribution: Mallorca, Balearic Islands
Traits
Height	Males	66–73 cm
	Females	62–68 cm
- Weight: about 40 kg
Kennel club standards
- Real Sociedad Canina de España: standard
- Fédération Cynologique Internationale: standard
- Notes: recognised in Spanish legislation

The Ca de Bestiar, also known as the Majorca Shepherd Dog or Spanish: Perro de Pastor Mallorquín, is a Spanish breed of shepherd dog indigenous to the island of Mallorca, in the Balearic Islands of Spain. It is used as a shepherd dog, or as a watchdog or guard dog for rural property. It is one of four recognised dog breeds of the island, the others being the Ca de Bou, the Ca Mè Mallorquí and the Ca Rater Mallorquí.

It is of medium size. The coat is usually short, but may also be long; it is entirely black, either with or without a white patch on the chest.

== History ==
The Ca de Bestiar is a traditional shepherd dog of the Balearic island of Mallorca; its origins are unknown. While it is mentioned in some earlier texts, the first descriptions of it date from the nineteenth century.

In 1980 a breed standard was approved and the Ca de Bestiar was recognised by the Real Sociedad Central para el Fomento de las Razas Caninas en España, as the national kennel club was known at that time. The breed was definitively accepted by the Fédération Cynologique Internationale in 1982. In 2001 it was recognised as a national breed by the Ministerio de Agricultura, Pesca y Alimentación, the Spanish ministry of agriculture. A breed association, the Club del Ca de Bestiar, was recognised by the government of the Balearic Islands in 2002.

In 2024 the total number of the dogs was reported to be 507, more than twice the number of the other large dog of the islands, the Ca de Bou, of which there were 243 examples. In 2026 both were among the sixteen Spanish dog breeds considered by the Real Sociedad Canina de España to be vulnerable.

== Characteristics ==
It is of medium size, with a body weight in the region of 40 kg. Heights at the withers are usually in the ranges 62 to 68 cm for bitches and 66 to 73 cm for dogs; the height at the rump is equal to the height at the withers.

The dogs are usually short-haired, with a close-fitting smooth outer coat about 1.5–3 cm in length, and a thin fine undercoat. Both the national and the international breed standard also describe a longer coat, with outer hair about 7 cm long; this variant is rare or possibly extinct.

The only recognised coat colour is black, in various shades, either with or without a white patch on the chest. Other coat colours may occur in working dogs, as may brindled patterning. The skin is pale grey. The ears are triangular in shape and hang close to the head.

== Use ==
It is a traditional working pastoral dog, used principally in the management of sheep, but also with cattle and goats. The dogs may also be the fierce guardians of estancias or rural dwellings; male dogs in particular are highly territorial and often combative among themselves.
