= Spanish Mastiff =

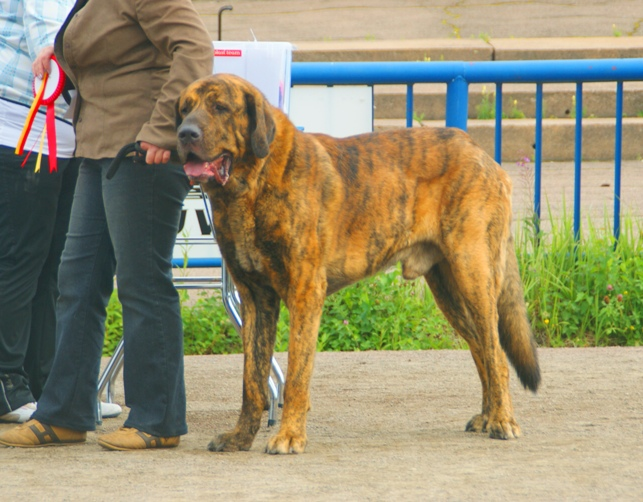
- Other names: Mastin Español; Mastín Español de campo y trabajo Mastín Ganadero; Mastín Leonés; Mastín Extremeño
- Origin: Spain
Traits
Height	Males	Over 80 cm (31 in)
	Females	Over 75 cm (30 in)
- Weight: 65–120 kg (143–265 lb)
Kennel club standards
- RSCFRCE: standard
- Fédération Cynologique Internationale: standard

The Spanish Mastiff or Mastín Español is a breed of mastiff from Spain, originally bred to be a guard dog and whose specialized purpose is to be a livestock guardian dog protecting flocks and/or herds from wolves and other predators.

== Historical context ==
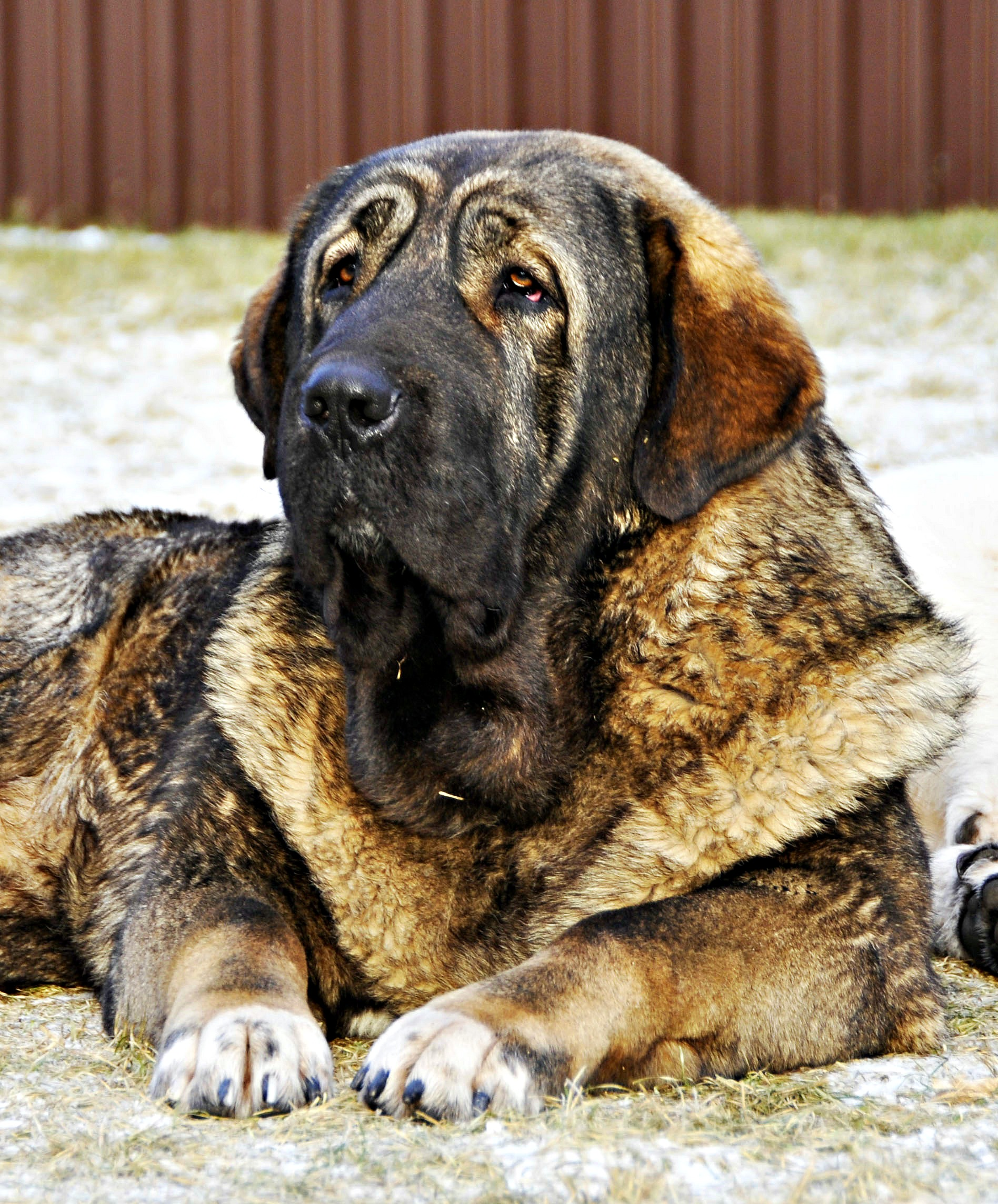
A brindle Spanish Mastiff

The Spanish mastiff is thought to have existed for thousands of years. Mastiffs were working as livestock guardian dogs when the Romans arrived on the Iberian Peninsula. In medieval times, this dog accompanied the herds of sheep and goats crossing from northern to southern Spain, defending cattle from attack by wolves and other predators. The mastiff had the protection of chunky metal necklaces with skewers. Its function was primarily protective, unlike its fellow Carea dogs, whose function is grazing, driving the herds in response to indications of the shepherd. In some places it is known as perro merinero when it accompanies sheep of the Merino breed.

The first breed standard of the Spanish Mastiff was made by the FCI in 1946. In 1981 the Asociación Española del Perro Mastín Español was formed, who organized a breeding program looking for the kind of large and strong mastiff of the past times, and drafted a new breed standard focused on recovering the old cattle dogs, fit as pets, and as guard dog and defense.

== Appearance ==
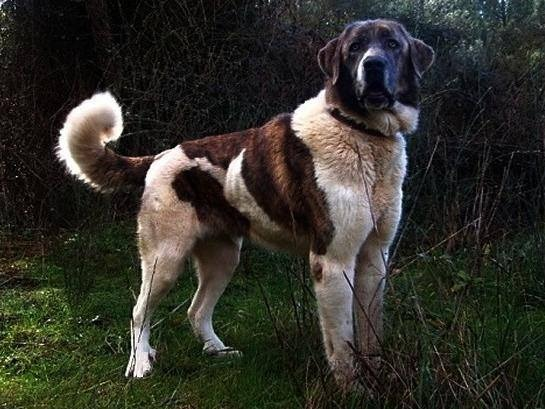
A Spanish Mastiff

The Spanish Mastiff is a very large and powerful dog, similar in appearance to the other mastiff breeds. They have a large powerful head and serious and vigilant expression.

Males in this breed are 70 to 85 centimetres (28 to 33 in) tall at the withers, and range from 80 to 120 kilograms (180 to 260 lb). Females are at least 65 centimetres (26 in), and weigh 65 to 80 kilograms (143 to 176 lb). The ideal Spanish Mastiff is at least 70 centimetres (28 in) at the withers.

It has small eyes and drop ears resembling triangles. This dog's coat is most often fawn, but it can also be brindle, black or 'wolf'-colored. Reddish tones indicate miscegenation.

== Temperament ==
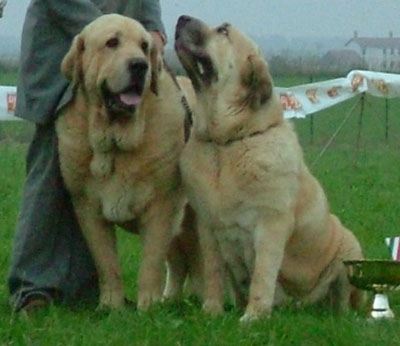
Two fawn Spanish Mastiffs

A member of the breed is generally aloof, dignified, calm and intelligent. It is devoted to its family and may politely accept strangers if it has been socialized properly, although it will be wary of them. It can be aggressive toward other dogs. The Spanish Mastiff may be a less-than-ideal pet in urban situations, where its booming voice and massive size could be problematic.

Socialization and training should begin early in the dogs life to ensure the dog is a stable and reliable pet. Supervised exposure in puppyhood to a variety of unfamiliar but non-aggressive dogs will help reduce the tendency of being aggression toward other dogs. The breed is generally alert and food motivated but can bore easily; training must be consistent and firm but gentle. Once the trainer has established the dog's respect as leader, the Spanish Mastiff will in most cases be an extremely loyal pet.

== Exercise ==
This dog is more inclined to lumber than gallop, but it can move quite rapidly when necessary. A long daily walk will be sufficient, although it will appreciate a fenced area where it can exercise at its own rate.

== Varieties ==
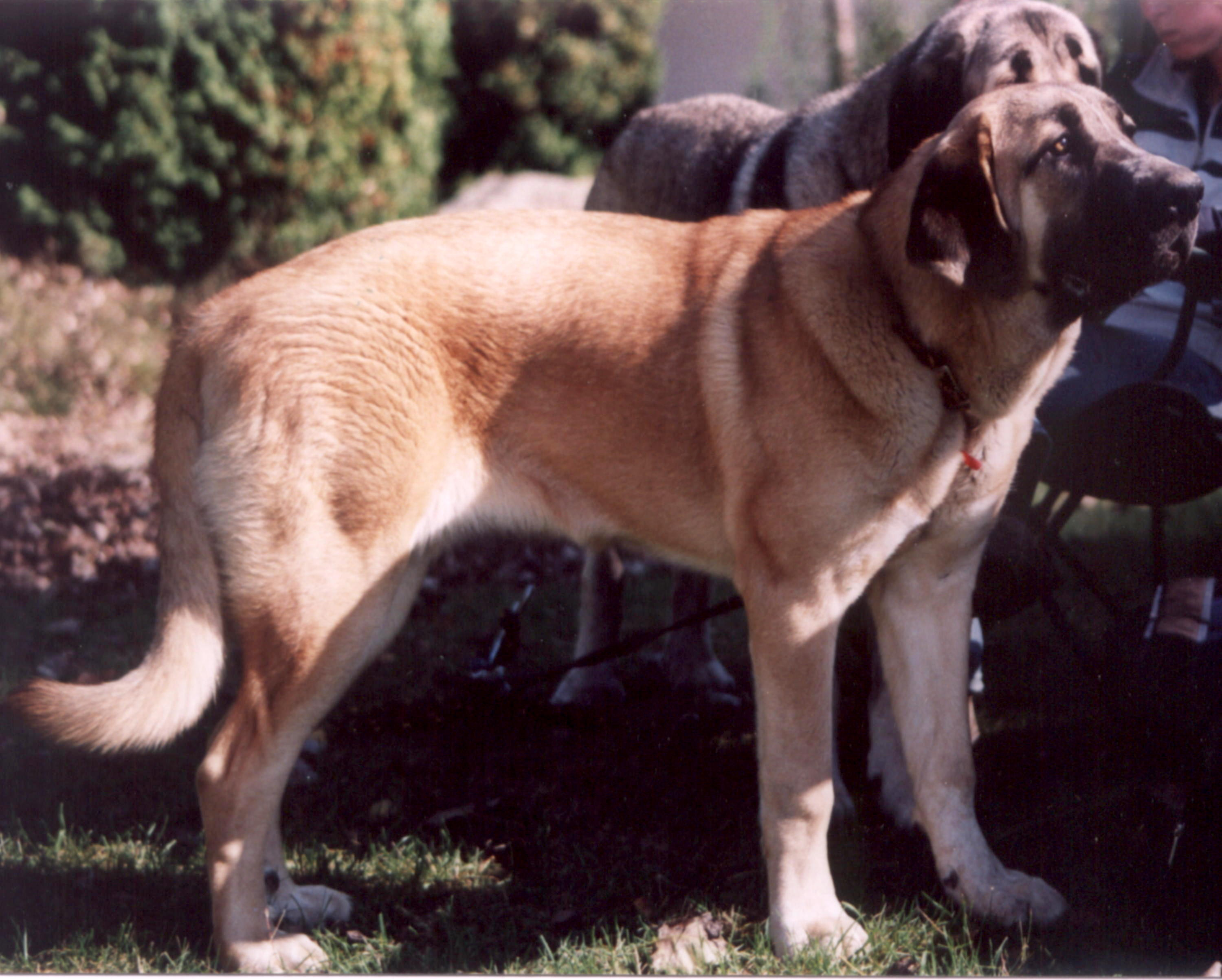
Arguably, the breed's more primitive variety, the Traditional Spanish Mastiff

In addition to its considered "official" variety, which is the current and modern Spanish Mastiff framed in a rigid aesthetic pattern and recognized by the largest canine entities, there is also its more primitive, traditional variety, considered unofficial, that does not meet any aesthetic standards and has as its objective, still today, to serve its owners acting in the protection of flocks against predators. These unofficial strains, for the purpose of differentiation, are termed the Traditional Spanish Mastiff, Working Spanish Mastiff, Leonese Mastiff, and Wolf Dog. These unofficial strains continue to act actively in their original and primitive function, with figures published by the World Wide Fund for Nature in 1986 showing a 61% reduction in predation of livestock when flocks are guarded by Mastiffs.

== Health ==
Spanish Mastiffs are especially prone to hip dysplasia. The Traditional Spanish Mastiff has a lower prevalence of the disease than the official variety.

== Representative dogs ==
- Actor Viggo Mortensen has, by a gift when he was in León, both a Carea Leonés and a Spanish Mastiff, named "Aragorn" and "Alatriste", the names of two characters that he played in his movies.

== See also ==
- List of dog breeds
