= Burgos Pointer =

Perdiguero de Burgos
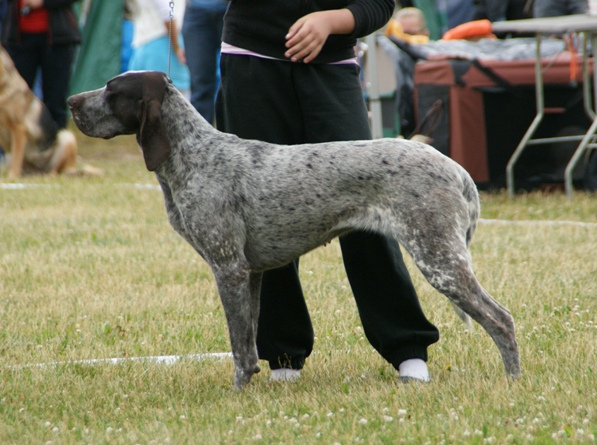
- Female Burgalese Pointer
- Other names: Perdiguero de Burgos; Burgalese Pointer
- Origin: Castile and León (Spain)
Traits
Height	Males	62 to 67 cm (24 to 26 in)
	Females	59 to 64 cm (23 to 25 in)
- Weight: 25 to 30 kg (55 to 66 lb)
- Coat: Short, Bushy and Smooth
- Colour: Brown/combined with brown/spottled
Kennel club standards
- RSCFRCE: standard
- Fédération Cynologique Internationale: standard

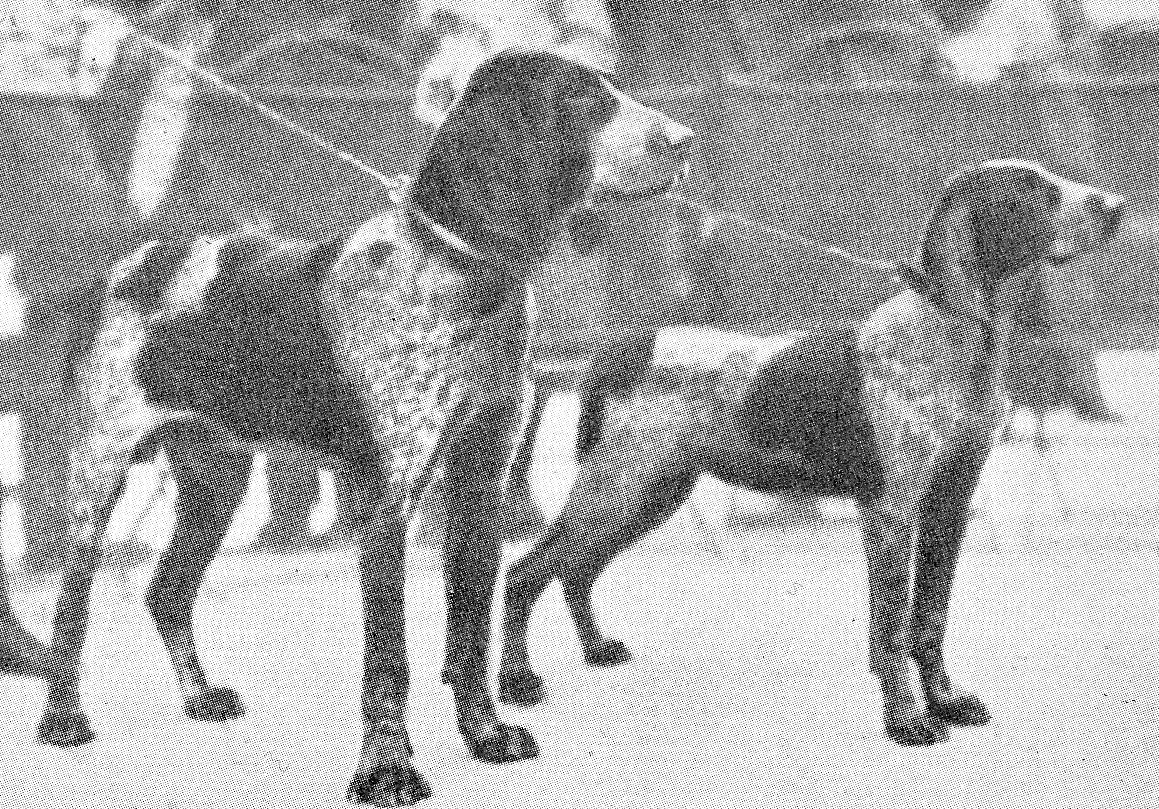
Two Burgalese Pointers (c. 1932).

The Burgos Pointer (Spanish: Perdiguero de Burgos), also called the Burgalese Pointer, is a breed of dog native to Spain. Originating from Castile, especially in the province of Burgos, it is used for hunting, especially small game.

== History ==
The breed dates back to the 16th century and originates in the Castilian plateau, which is very widespread. It is very probable that the breed participated in the creation of other races of this group.

The breed is believed to have descended from a mix of the Sabueso Español and the Pachón Navarro (also known as the Perros de Punta Ibericos).

In 2026 it was among the sixteen Spanish breeds considered by the Real Sociedad Canina de España to be vulnerable.

== Description ==
The figure of the Burgos Pointer is perhaps not so style crystallized as other breeds in their group (such as the English Pointer), but conveys a clear sense of robustness thanks to its port square. Things to note are their long ears and two folded sheets in the form of double chin. The tail is usually cut off a third of its original length.

Colour: It has two color variations: one where the basic color is stained and/or combined with other brown and brown, where the basic color is brown which is, in this case, white spotted.

Coat: The fur is short, bushy and smooth.

Height: Males from 62 to 67 centimetres (24 to 26 inches) and females from 59 to 64 centimetres (23 to 25 inches).

Weight: 25 to 30 kilograms (55 to 66 pounds).

== Care ==
If kept in its natural environment, care is rarely needed given its perfect adaptation to the environment. Like so many other breeds of hunting dogs, they require daily exercise and large doses of wide open spaces where they run.

== Temperament ==
It is a gentle, quiet dog, and is rarely startled. It does not do well in urban environments. Due to their even temper they are very good with children. Their reactions are predictable, and a common description of their temperament is "noble".

It is intelligent and learns easily when it comes to hunting.

== Utility ==
Like many other breeds of this group, this is a dog hunter, used exclusively in countryside environments. It's used for both hunting hare (rabbits, hares, etc.). and birds.
