= Carea Leonés =

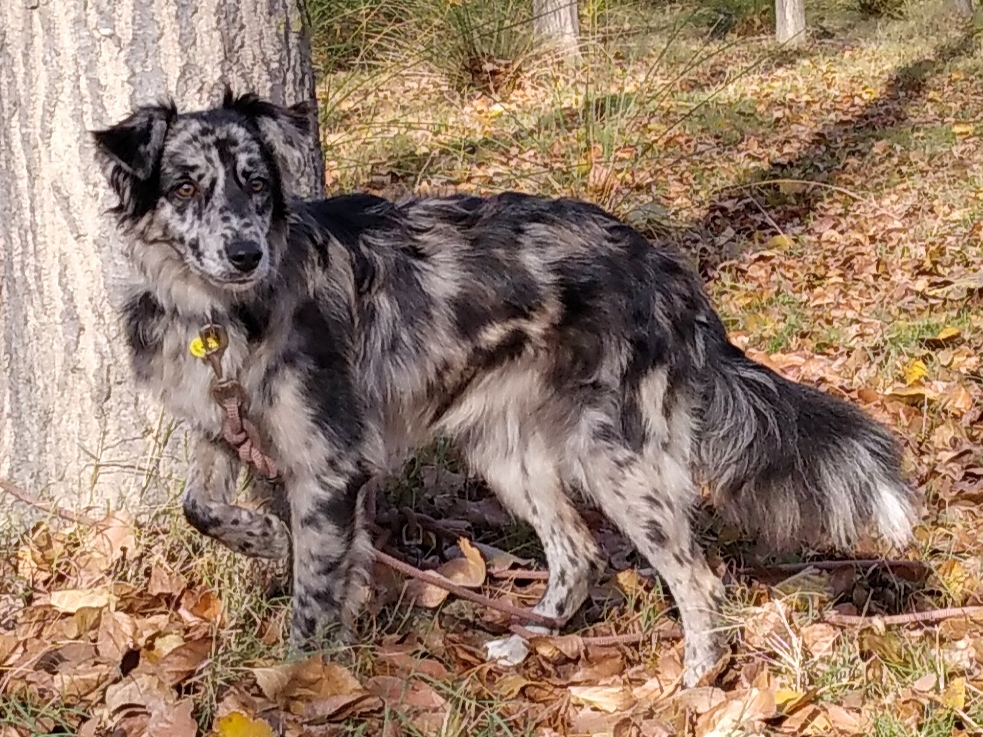

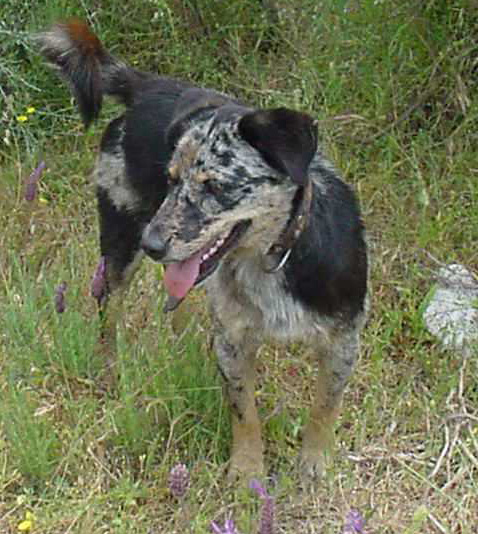
- Other names: Leonese Sheepdog; Perro Carea Leonés; Perro de Aqueda; Perro de Pastor Leonés
- Origin: Spain
- Distribution: León
Kennel club standards
- Real Sociedad Canina de España: standard
- Notes: recognized in Spanish legislation

The Carea Leonés or Perro Leonés de Pastor is a traditional Spanish breed of herding dog from the historical region of León in north-western Spain. It was added to the Catálogo Oficial de Razas de Ganado de España – the national register of animal breeds – in 2016, and a breed standard was published by the Junta de Castilla y León in 2018.

== History ==
The Carea Leonés is the traditional herding dog of the historical region of León in north-western Spain. It was included in the Catálogo Oficial de Razas de Ganado de España – the national register of animal breeds – in 2016, and a breed standard was published by the Junta de Castilla y León in 2018.

In 2026 it was among the sixteen Spanish breeds considered by the Real Sociedad Canina de España to be vulnerable.

== Characteristics ==
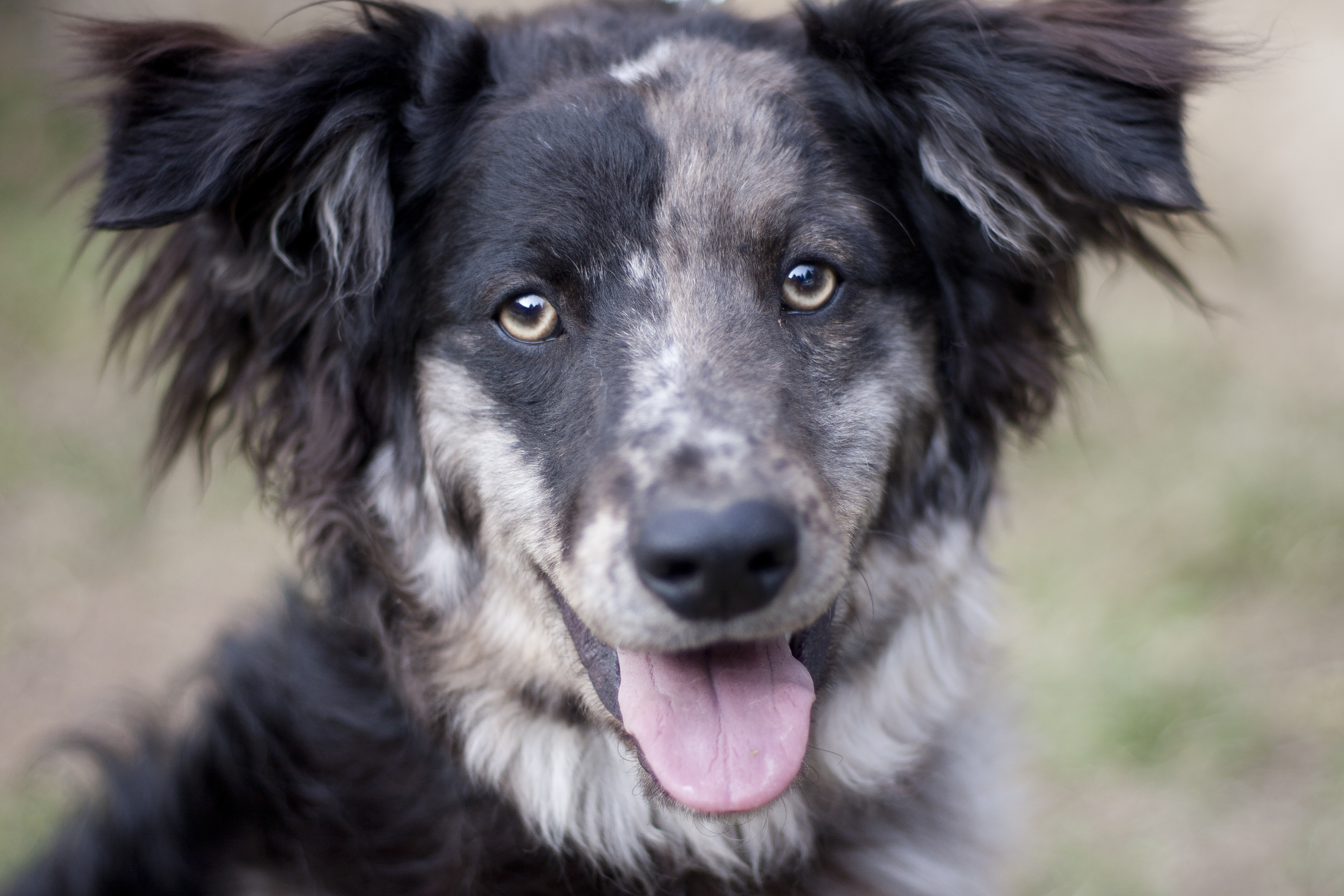

The Carea Leonés is of medium size: bitches stand from 45 to 52 cm at the withers, dogs from 48 to 55 cm; body weights are usually in the ranges 15–25 kg and 16–27 kg respectively.

The outer coat is of medium length and is either straight or slightly wavy; the under-coat is thick. The coat may be either solid black or grey merle (black spots on a grey base, sometimes with white spots also); in either colouration, fawn markings above the eyes, on the face and on the insides of the legs may or may not be present. The eyes are always dark in black-coated dogs, but paler in those with merle colouration; in these there may also be heterochromia, resulting in bluish-white areas in one or both eyes.
