= Galgo Español =

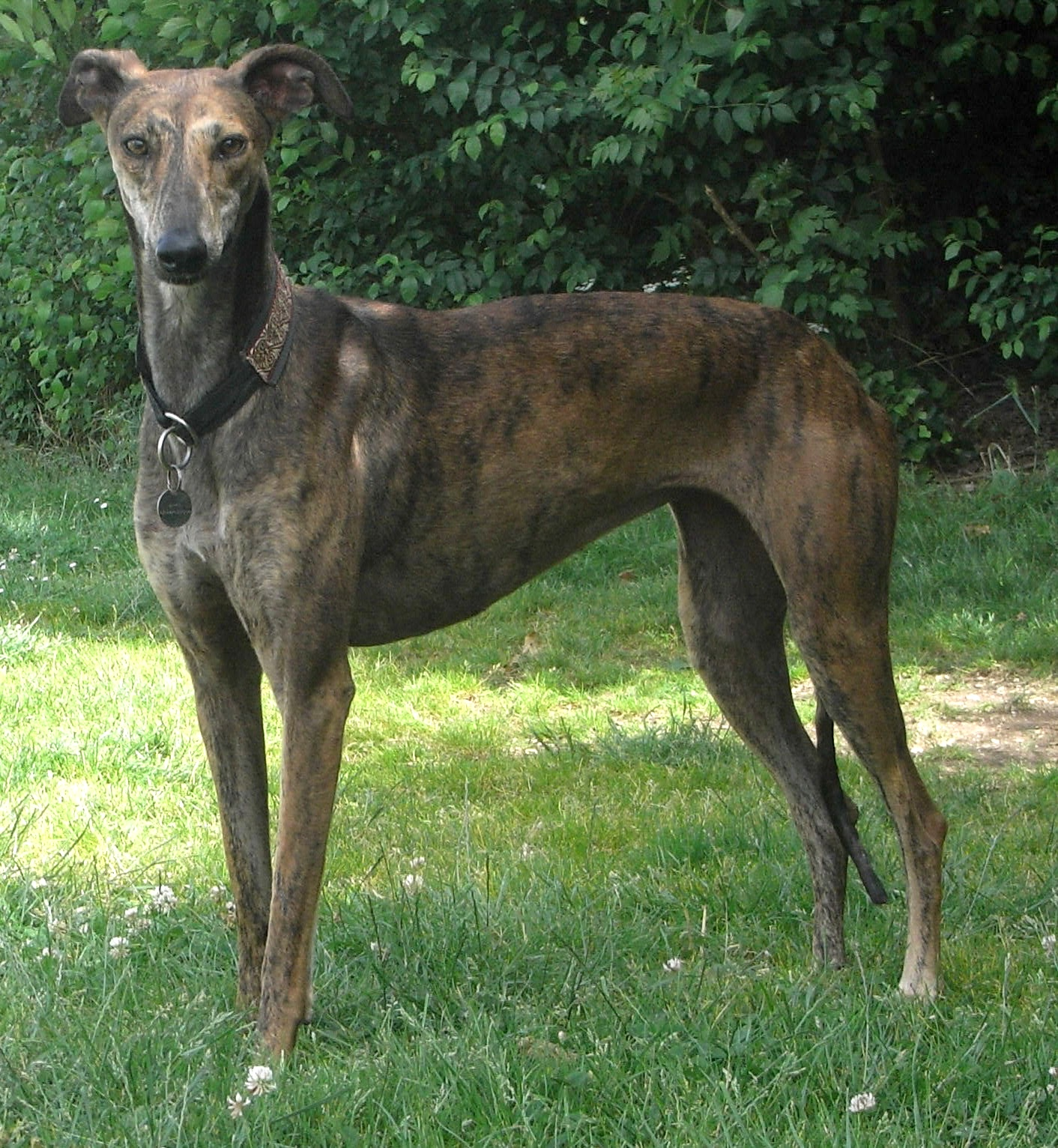

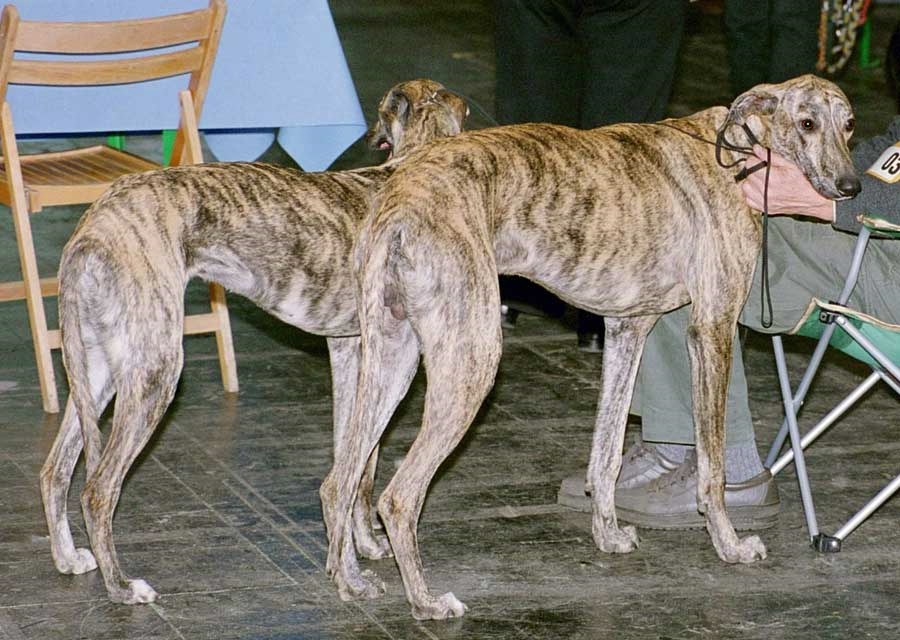
- Other names: Galgo; Spanish Galgo; Spanish Greyhound
- Origin: Spain
Traits
Height	Males	62–70 cm (24–28 in)
	Females	60–68 cm (24–27 in)
- Coat: smooth or rough
- Colour: any
Kennel club standards
- Real Sociedad Canina de España: standard
- Fédération Cynologique Internationale: standard

The Galgo Español or Spanish Greyhound is a Spanish breed of dog of sighthound type, bred specifically for coursing hare and other game. The English greyhound is possibly a descendant of the Spanish greyhound and, for several years in the 20th century, some breeders did cross-breed Galgos and Greyhounds in order to produce faster and more powerful Galgos, specifically for track racing purposes.

== History ==
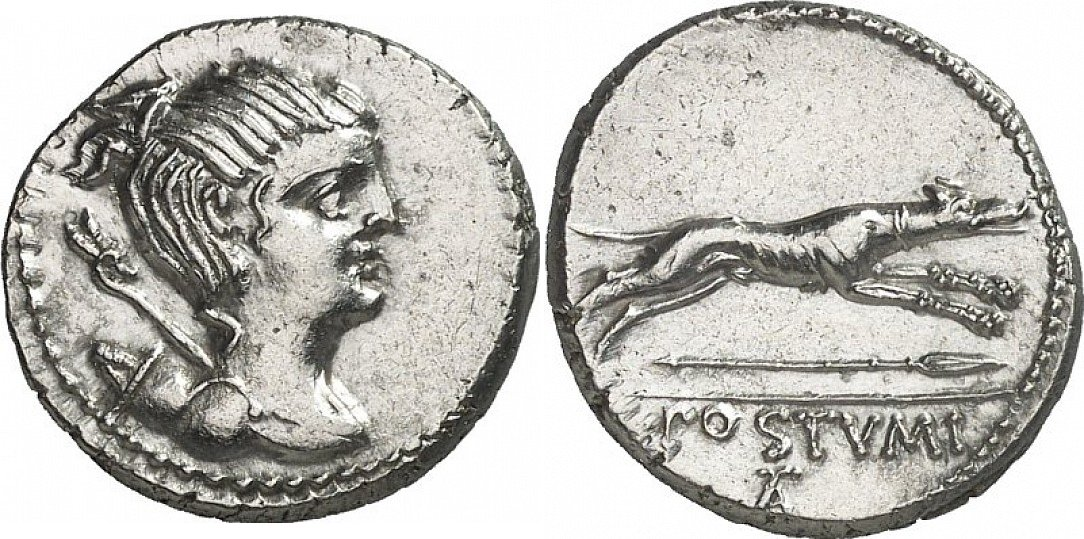
Roman denarius showing a vertragus type or greyhound-like dog

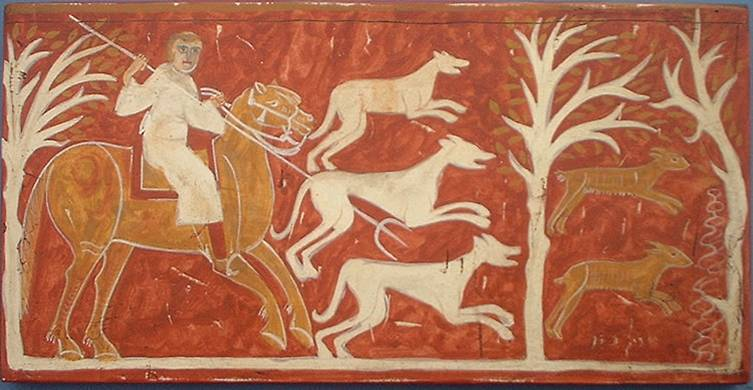
Fresco with dogs, church of San Baudelio de Berlanga, province of Soria

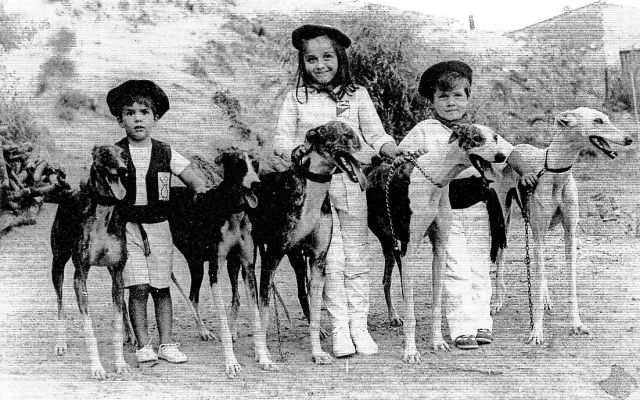
Children with dogs in La Rioja

The Spanish greyhound is thought to have descended from Sloughis brought to the Iberian Peninsula during the Muslim conquest. However the existence of the Celtic vertragus in Roman Iberia 2,000 years ago, as described by Arrian and Martial, suggests that it and its possible descendant the Galgo, may more likely be of Central European type in origin. After it was established in Spain, it is thought to have been cross-bred centuries later with the Sloughi brought from North Africa by the Moors. Some writers suggest that this breed may be ancestral to the English Greyhound.

The Galgo name is probably derived from the Latin Canis Gallicus or 'Dog from Gaul'. The Spanish word for all kinds of Greyhounds — including the Galgo — is lebrel, which means 'harrier' or 'dog for chasing hares', since liebre is Spanish for 'hare'. The same derivative is seen in the Italian levriero and the French lévrier. The first written references to an ancient Celtic sighthound, the vertragus, in the Cynegeticus of Flavius Arrianus (Arrian), Roman proconsul of the Spanish province of Baetica in the second century, may refer to the Galgo's antecedent.

Arrian described his personal experience in Spain. His description of hare hunting is very similar to that used with the Galgo nowadays in Spain, adding that it was a general Celtic tradition not related to social class. He indicated that there were not only smooth-haired types of the vertragus but also rough-coated ones.

There is little evidence for mention of the Galgo or its antecedent in the first centuries of the Middle Ages, but it appeared to have survived and flourished in the second half of the period.

In the 9th and 10th centuries, the frontier between Christian and Muslim territories shifted southwards, and vast areas of Castile were newly settled. This open land introduced a new mode of hunting with dogs: while the North of Spain is mountainous, the regions progressively recovered were flat, open areas full of small animals like hares, which provided the Galgo a useful opportunity for hunting. At that time it was considered a noble dog, and was kept mainly by the aristocracy of both the Christian and the Muslim kingdoms in which Spanish territory was still divided. It is likely that the Galgo and the Sloughi (perhaps also Saluki) were interbred during this period.

The great esteem in which the Galgo was held is evident by the many laws of the time designed to punish the killing or theft of the breed: Fuero of Salamanca (9th century); Fuero of Cuenca; Fuero of Zorita de los Canes; Fuero of Molina de Aragón (12th century); Fuero of Usagre (12th century). In the Cartuario of Slonza is a will written in Villacantol in which, using an odd mixture of Latin and Spanish, the Mayor Gutiérrez bequeaths a Galgo to Diego Citid in the year 1081:

Urso galgo colore nigro ualente caetum sólidos dae argento;
'a black Galgo with patches of silver';

That this dog was a significant item in a noble's will demonstrates the great value accorded it at the time.

The mural paintings at the Hermitage of San Baudelio de Berlanga, in Soria, dating from the 12th century show a hunting scene with three Galgos apparently identical to the ones that we can see today.

In the Renaissance Martínez del Espinar writes in his book Arte de Ballestería y Montería ("The Art of Hunting and Archery"):

Muchas maneras hay de matar estos animales [las liebres]. Muchas, diré las que en España usan: correnlas con galgos, que aquí los hay ligerísimos, y así mismo lo son algunas liebres, que se les escapan sin poderlas alcanzar; y no porque corren hoy dejan de volver a sus querencias; antes estas liebres corredoras las continúan, porque tienen conocido el camino de su uida, y por la mayor parte se encaman cerca de alguna senda o camino, orilla de algún soto, monte o ladera, o tierra pedregosa, y así huyen de ellas y de ir cuesta abajo que las alcanzan luego en las laderas y tierra tiesa, parece que vuelan.
'There is a large variety of ways to kill these animals [the hares]. 'Nevertheless, I will tell of those that are used in Spain: they hunt them with Galgos, since here there are some extremely swift ones, although some hares are as swift as them, and sometimes do get away from them. But even having run and got scared today, these hares will come back to their homes tomorrow. They know the way back. They spend the night in some quiet place: a road, a hill, a stony field. In fact they are sometimes surprised in such places by the dogs; then they run away down to the plain, and the dogs try to chase them over the flat ground. They seem to fly.'

The Galgo appears to have developed first in the Castilian plains, both in the north (Valladolid, Zamora, Ávila Salamanca, Segovia, Soria, Burgos and Palencia) and the south (Toledo, Cuenca, Guadalajara, Madrid and Ciudad Real) of Castilla. And, afterwards, in more southern territories: La Mancha and Andalusia. It became the typical dog type of the Spanish interior, while the bloodhound plays the same role in the coast regions.

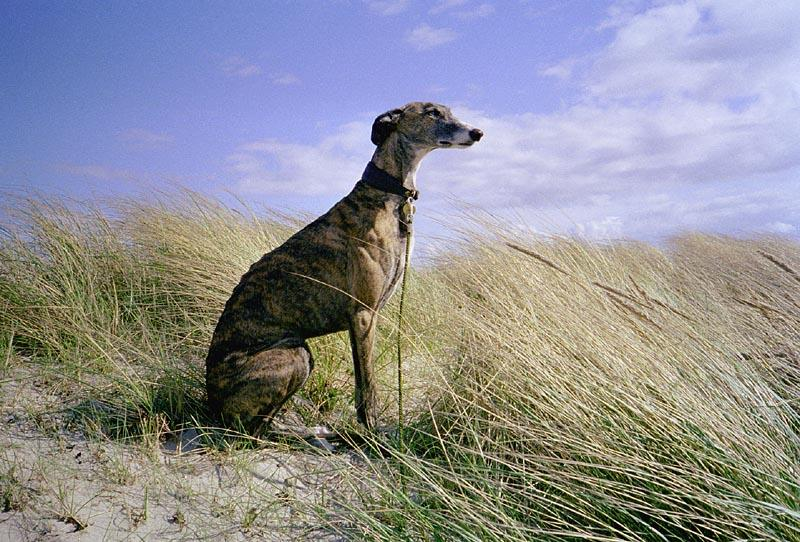
Bitch in Castile

The Galgo appears not only in hunting books but also in common Spanish expressions, as well as in literature. The most famous reference is perhaps the one contained in the opening sentence of Don Quixote de La Mancha:

En un lugar de la Mancha, de cuyo nombre no quiero acordarme, no ha mucho tiempo que vivía un hidalgo de los de lanza en astillero, adarga antigua, rocín flaco y galgo corredor.
'In a village of La Mancha, the name of which I have no desire to call to mind, there lived not long since one of those gentlemen that keep a lance in the lance-rack, an old buckler, a lean hack, and a galgo for coursing.'

There are plenty of common expressions in Spain that name the Galgo: for example, A galgo viejo, echadle liebre, no conejo, which means 'use old Galgos for chasing hares instead of rabbits', suggesting that it is best to use experienced people for hard tasks and challenges. Galgo que va tras dos liebres, sin ninguna vuelve, meaning 'if a Galgo tries to chase two hares, it will return with none', recommending focussing on a single effort, otherwise failing by distraction.

Although the breed did not apparently experience any significant change in the 18th and 19th centuries, and was kept in its vocation as a swift hunting dog, maybe the most telling proverb which mentions the Galgo is one dating from the beginning of the nineteenth century: A los galgos del Rey no se les escapa la liebre; 'The hare never escapes from the King's Galgos', which was used at first to satirize the corrupt government of Fernando VII, considered to cheat in everything it did.

In the first years of the 20th century, large scale crossbreeding occurred between the Galgo and the English Greyhound in order to create faster dogs for professional track racing. This certainly affected the purity of the breed as the resulting dogs were just a bit faster, but did lose their long-distance-running abilities. Finally breeders came to the conclusion that it was not worth crossbreeding. The purebred Galgo kept its major presence in the Spanish villages as an excellent hunting type.

Despite its antiquity and importance, the Spanish Galgo has only recently been acknowledged by cynological associations. The English Greyhound has tended to outshine the Galgo. The breed faces the 21st century progressively more appreciated at home and abroad, as contemporary Spain becomes more conscious of the uniqueness and heritage of this animal.

In 2026 it was among the sixteen Spanish breeds considered by the Real Sociedad Canina de España to be vulnerable.

== Description ==
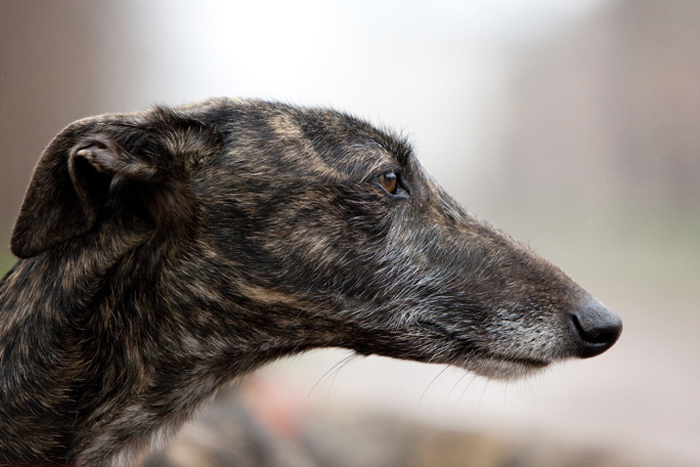
Spanish Galgo in barcino colour

=== Appearance ===
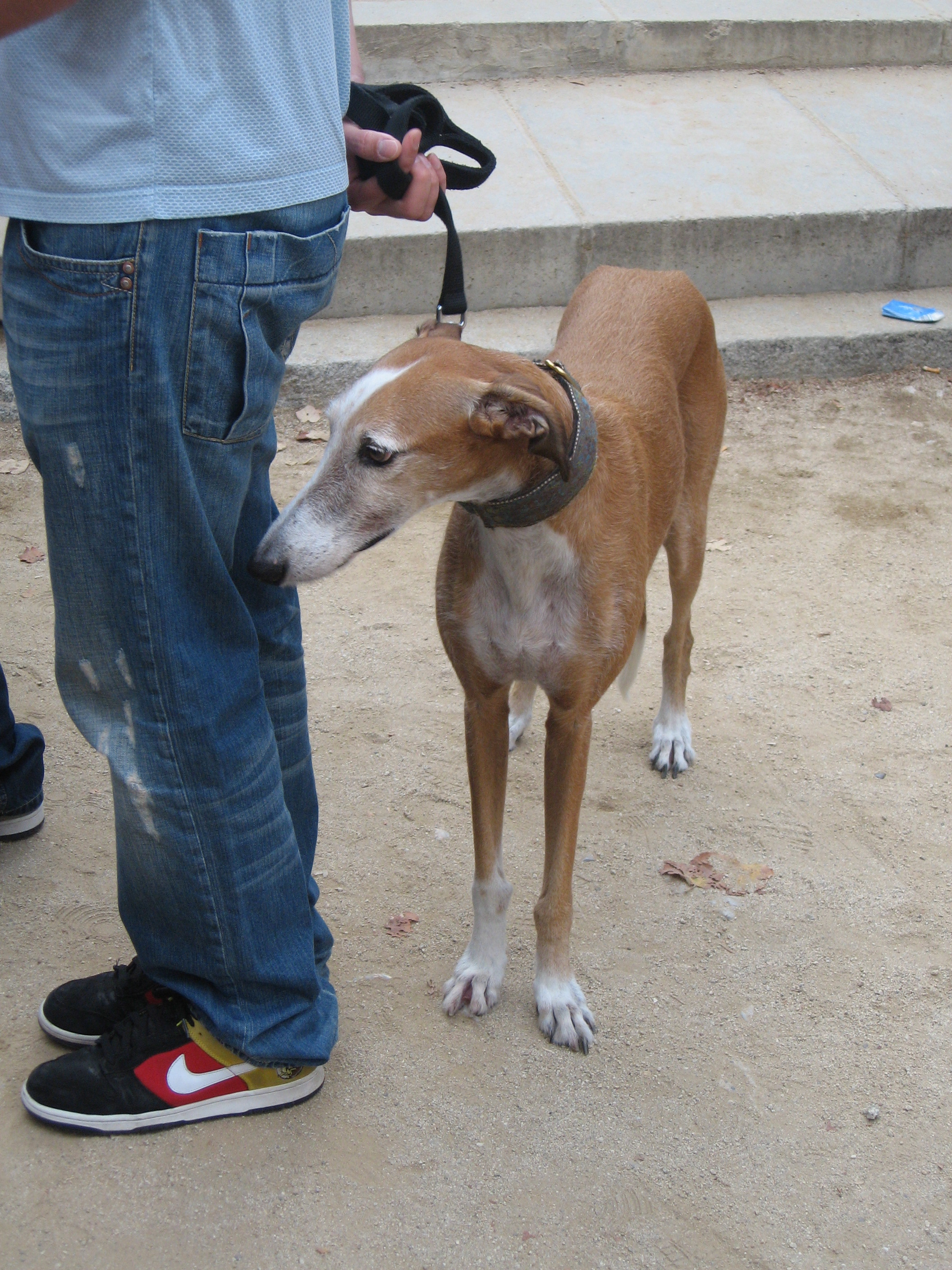

Galgos are similar in appearance to Greyhounds, but are distinctly different in their conformation. Galgos are higher in the rear than in the front and have flatter muscling than a Greyhound, which is characteristic of endurance runners. They also tend to be smaller, lighter in build, have longer tails and have a very long, streamlined head that gives the impression of larger ears. Their chests are not as deep as a Greyhound's and should not reach the point of the elbow.

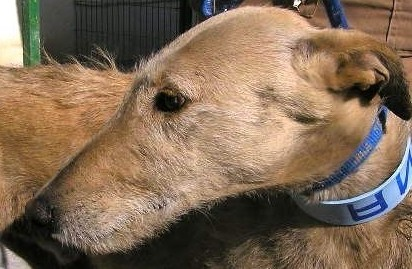
An example of a rough-coated Galgo

Unlike Greyhounds, Galgos come in two coat types: smooth and rough. The rough coat can provide extra protection from skin injuries while running in the field. They come in a variety of colors and coat patterns. Main colors are barcino or atigrado (brindle), negro (black), barquillo (golden), tostado (toasted), canela (cinnamon), amarillo (yellow), rojo (red), blanco (white), berrendo (white with patches) or pío (any colour with white muzzle and forehead).

=== Health ===
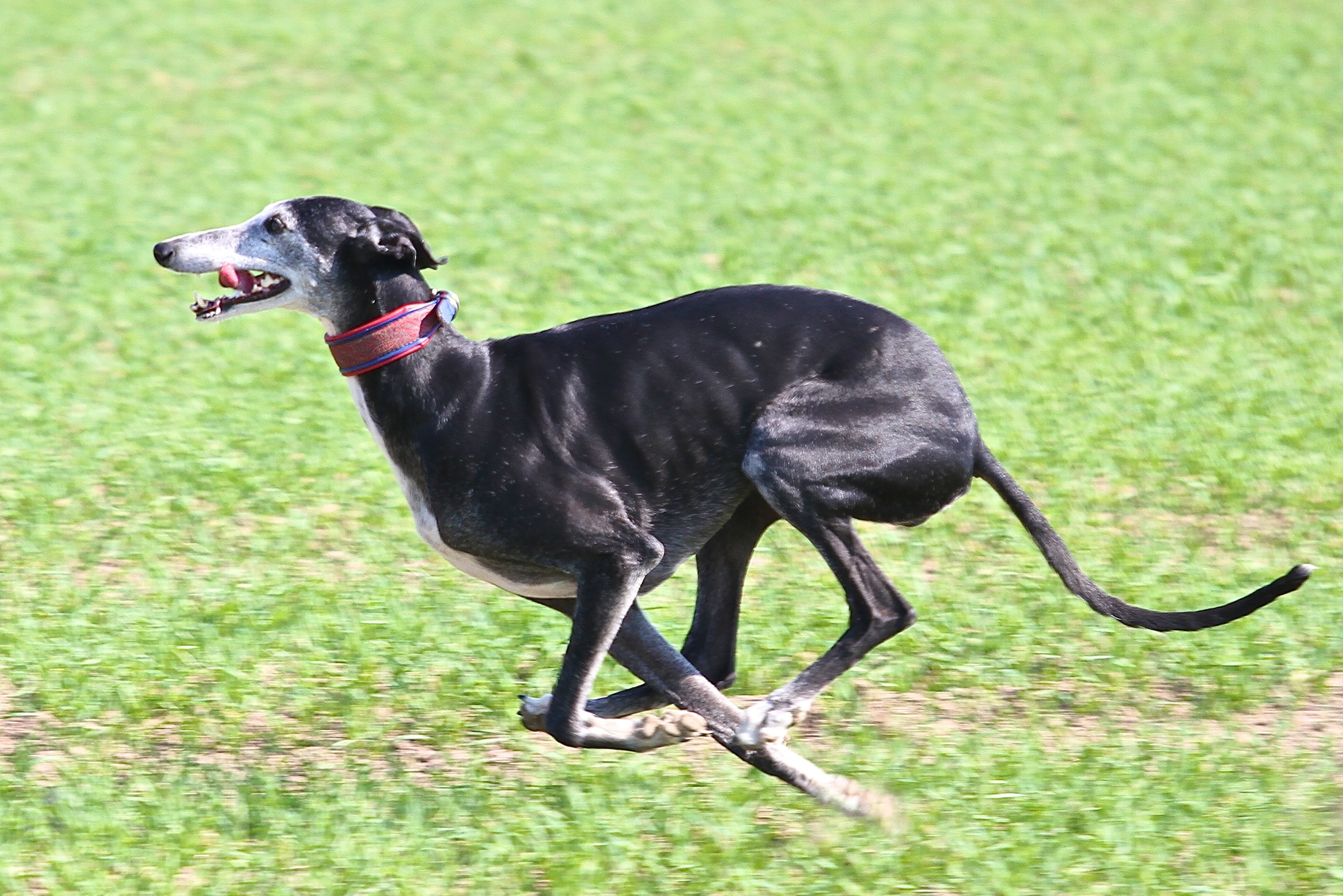
Running

Like many other sighthounds, Galgos are a fairly healthy breed, although they are sensitive to anaesthesia.

== Use ==
The Galgo is used for hunting, as well as for racing, for lure coursing or for coursing the hare in an open field where dogs hunt prey without human intervention during the chase.

== Mistreatment ==
There are many reports of Galgos being treated cruelly by their hunters and breeders in Spain. An estimated 50,000 to 100,000 Galgos and Podencos are killed, often brutally, each year by their hunters, also known as galgueros. Methods of killing reportedly include burning, hanging, stoning, and poisoning, which according to Finnish politician Laura Huhtasaari is "based on the belief that the more painfully a dog dies, the better luck a hunter will have next year". Some Galgos are strapped to moving cars as part of their training, which can lead to them being dragged by the car and mangled. Poorly performing dogs are often beaten, mutilated, starved to death, thrown down wells or hung from trees by their owners. Abusing dogs that hunt poorly was a widespread practice, as there were no penalties for hunters. A new law, as of January 5, 2022, amends the Civil Code to provide that animals may no longer be considered 'things' but 'sentient beings' and family members, and that animal owners are now required to provide proper care to ensure their animals’ well-being in accordance with the characteristics of each species. For the reasons described above, associations in defense of the Galgo have appeared with the aim to save these dogs from a terrible fate, provide much needed rehabilitation and find them adoptive homes, usually in the cities. Some associations will adopt them to other locations in Europe, including France, the U.K., Germany, Belgium and the Netherlands.
