= Mallorquí (surname) =

Mallorquí is a Spanish surname. Notable people with the surname include:

- Casimiro Mallorquí (1894–1966), Spanish footballer
- J. Mallorquí (1913–1972), Spanish writer

== See also ==
- Mallorcan dialect of Catalan (Catalan: mallorquí)
- Mallorquín, rare Spanish horse breed native to Mallorca (Catalan: Cavall Mallorquí)
