= Podenco Andaluz =

Spanish breed of dog

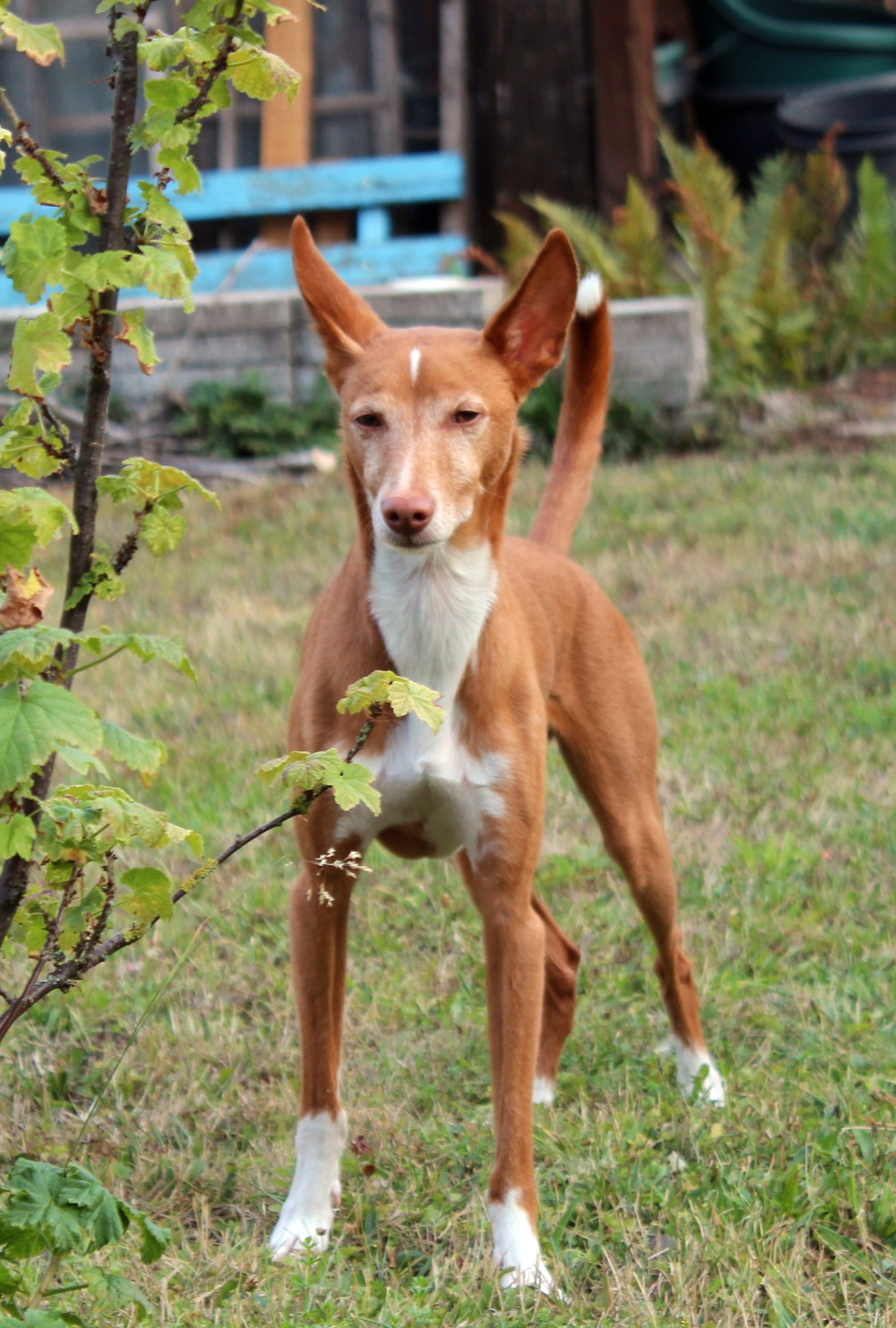
- Medium-sized, smooth-haired

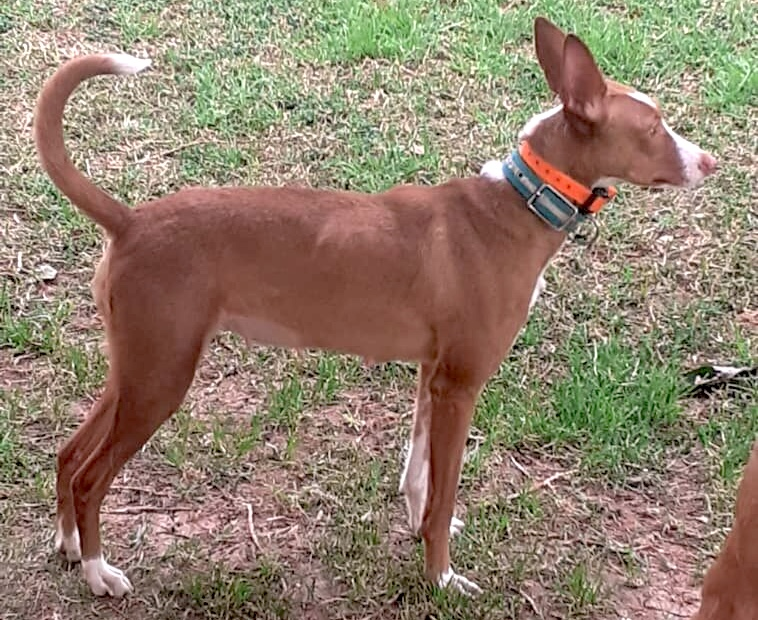
- Other names: Andalusian Warren Hound; Andalusian Podenco
- Origin: Spain
- Distribution: Andalucia
Traits
Height	Males	Small: 35–42 cm (14–17 in); Medium: 43–53 cm (17–21 in); Large: 54–64 cm (21–25 in)
	Females	Small: 32–41 cm (13–16 in); Medium: 42–53 cm (17–21 in); Large: 53–61 cm (21–24 in)
- Weight: Small: 5–11 kg (11–24 lb); Medium: 10–22 kg (22–49 lb); Large: 21–33 kg (46–73 lb)
Kennel club standards
- Real Sociedad Canina de España: standard
- Notes: recognised in Spanish legislation

The Podenco Andaluz is a Spanish breed of warren hound indigenous to the autonomous community of Andalusia, in south-western Spain. It is one of four podenco breeds recognized by the Real Sociedad Canina de España. It is an agile dog generally used to hunt ducks, rabbits, boar and fowl. There are three accepted sizes (small, medium and large) and three coat types (wire-haired, long-haired and smooth).

== History ==
The Podenco Andaluz is a traditional warren hound of Andalucia. It is little documented, and its history remains obscure. It was recognised by the Real Sociedad Canina de España in 1992, with a breed standard detailing the nine varieties within the breed. It received national recognition from the Ministerio de Agricultura, Pesca y Alimentación, the Spanish ministry of agriculture, with the publication of the official breed standard in May 2001.

It is not recognised by the Fédération Cynologique Internationale, but was recognized by the Verband für das Deutsche Hundewesen of Germany in 2014.

In 2009 it was one of the two most numerous dog breeds of Spain – the other being the Galgo Español; in 2026 the Podenco was among the sixteen Spanish breeds considered by the Real Sociedad Canina de España to be vulnerable.

== Characteristics ==
There are three sizes – large, medium and small – and three types of coat – wire-haired (Spanish: Cerdeño), long-haired (Spanish: Sedeño) and smooth. This combination of factors can results in nine different varieties. This variability may be the result of adaptation to the different microclimates within Andalusia, including mountains, agricultural land and marshes, as well as the diverse game targeted by hunters. Coat colors ranges from white to deep red. Podenco Andaluz have a trot as fast as their gallop.

Like other warren hounds, the Podenco has excellent sight, hearing and sense of smell. They are renowned for their methodical hunting style, as well as stamina and endurance while working in the mild winters with irregular precipitations, and dry, hot, sunny summers of Andalusia. Podenco Andaluz are lively dogs, affectionate, loyal to their owners, but wary with strangers.

Podenco Andaluz are used either singularly, in pairs or as part of a large hunting pack known as a rehala. Small and medium podenco Andaluz hunt rabbits with one dog entering the bramble to drive out the rabbit, while the rest lie in wait to catch it. Medium and smaller dogs search out deer or wild boar, while the larger hounds are used for attacking the prey.

One of the most typical functions of the large Andalusian hound was that of the so-called quitaor (Note: Quitaor is the dialectal Andalusian word corresponding to the Castilian Spanish quitador. Hunting dogs with this role were trained not to eat or tear apart their prey.) accompanying the Spanish greyhound colleras (Note: According to the Diccionario de la lengua española, in Andalusian Spanish the word collera is defined as Pareja de ciertos animales, as in Una collera de pavos ('a pair of animals, such as a pair of turkeys). In hunting, the partners do not have to be a male and a female, although the meaning of collera is usually that of a mated pair.) during hare hunting. The quitaor‘s job consisted primarily of flushing out the hares from their home or hiding place and killing them; then, together with the greyhounds, retrieving them for the owner. Andalusian farmhouses would use the larger hounds as watchdogs, and the smaller hounds were used to kill rodents.

Genetically the Podenco Andaluz is most closely related to the Galgo Español.
