= Ratonero Valenciano =

Valencian Terrier Ratonero Valenciano
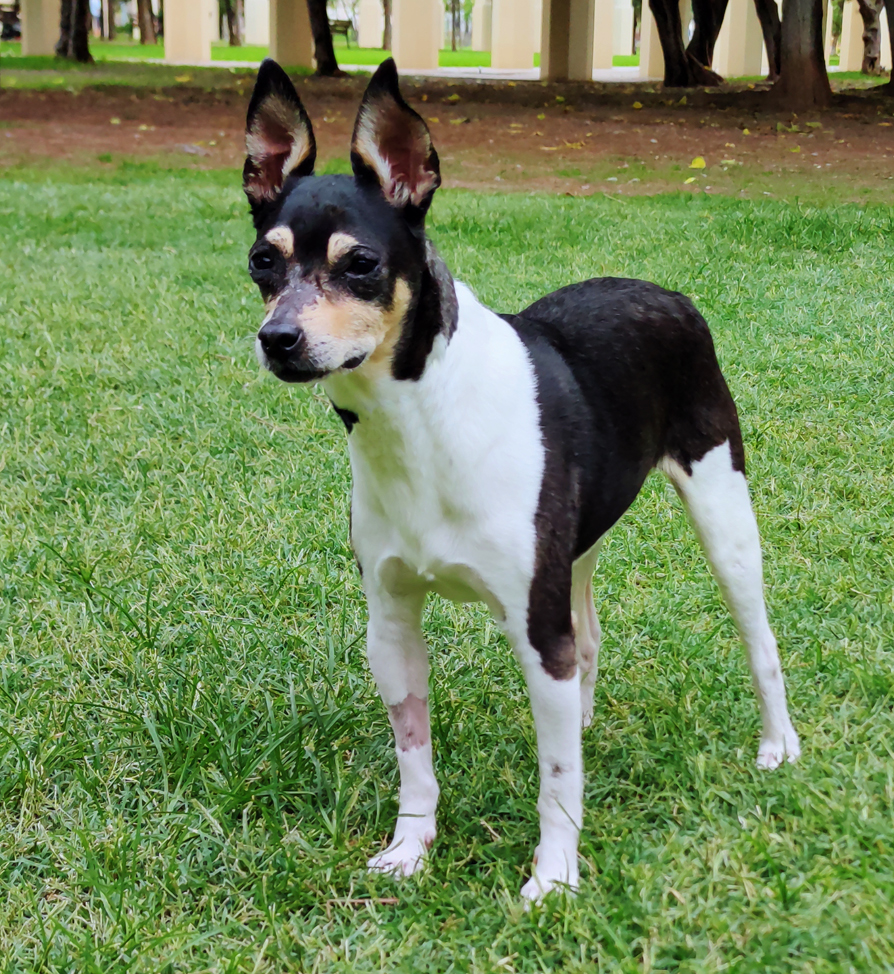

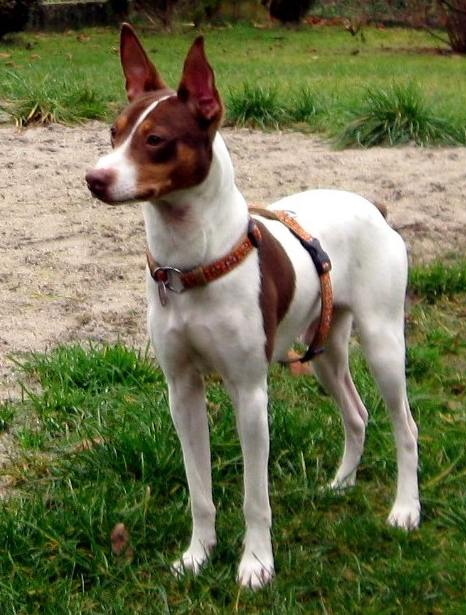
- Other names: Gos Rater Valencià
- Origin: Spain
- Distribution: Valencian Community
Traits
Height	Males	30–40 cm (12–16 in)
	Females	29–38 cm (11–15 in)
- Weight: 4–8 kg (8.8–17.6 lb)
- Coat: short, 2 cm (0.79 in)
- Colour: tricolour, black and tan, brown and tan, brown and white
Kennel club standards
- Real Sociedad Canina de España: standard
- Fédération Cynologique Internationale: standard

The Ratonero Valenciano or Gos Rater Valencià ('Valencian ratter') is a Spanish breed of ratting dog. It was recognised by the Real Sociedad Canina de España in 2004. A member of the breed won the Spanish National Dog Show in 2011. It is a traditionally docked breed. It was provisionally accepted by the Fédération Cynologique Internationale in 2022.

== History ==
The breed originates from Valencia in Spain, where it has traditionally been used to catch rats and other rodents. The breed is thought to have existed since the sixteenth century. There are several theories around the breed's origin, including either that stock from British Fox Terriers may have been introduced to native dogs, or that it is simply that breeding dogs for similar purposes have led to similar results.

The breed is recognized by the Real Sociedad Canina de España, the national kennel club for Spain, since 2004. The club uses the structure set out by the Fédération Cynologique Internationale, and places the breed within Group 3:Terriers, and the subgroup, Section 1:Large and medium-sized terriers. As of 31 December 2010, there were 523 Ratonero Valencianos registered with the RSCE.

In 2026 it was among the sixteen Spanish breeds considered by the Real Sociedad Canina de España to be vulnerable.

== Description ==
According to the breed standard, the coat should be short, no longer than 2 centimetres (0.79 in) in length. The most common markings are tricolor, with the colors dominating the white portion of the coat. Other markings include black and tan, brown and white, and brown and tan. The standard conformation show size for these dogs are 30–40 centimetres (12–16 in) for males at the withers, and 29–38 centimetres (11–15 in) for females. The ideal size is listed as 36 centimetres (14 in) and 33 centimetres (13 in) respectively. Both sexes weight ranges are the same, ideally 4–8 kilograms (8.8–17.6 lb).

The breed standard describes them as tailless dogs, and states that any tail should be cropped either "without respecting any vertebra or just the first".

== Use ==
The dogs are used in hunting, specifically for rabbits.
