= Ca de Bou =

Spanish breed of dog

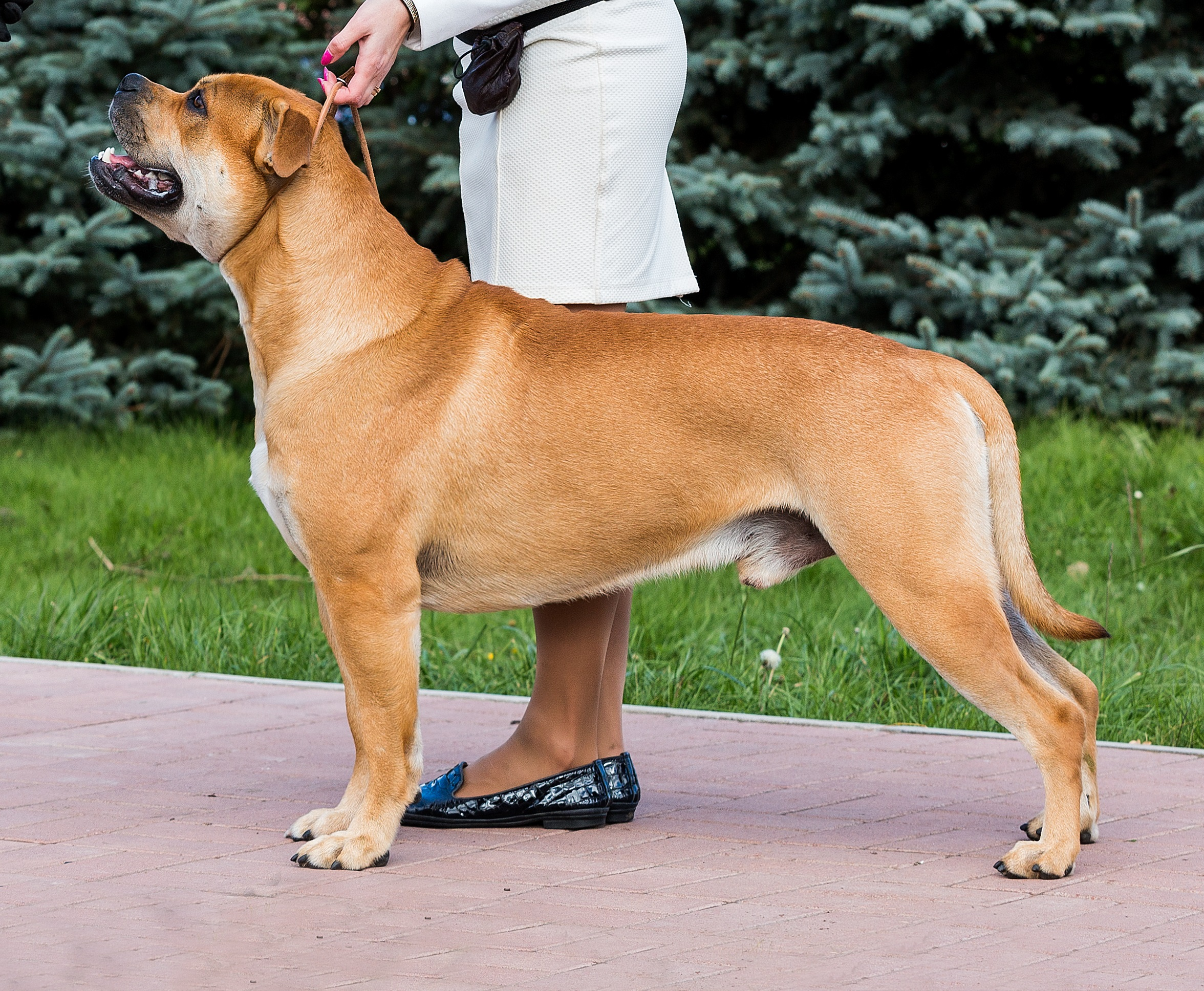
- Other names: Perro de Presa Mallorquín; Majorcan Bulldog; Majorcan Mastiff
- Origin: Spain (Mallorca)
Traits
Height	Males	55–58 cm (22–23 in)
	Females	52–55 cm (20–22 in)
Weight	Males	35–38 kg (77–84 lb)
	Females	30–34 kg (66–75 lb)
- Coat: short and rough
- Colour: brindle, fawn or black
Kennel club standards
- Real Sociedad Canina de España: standard
- Fédération Cynologique Internationale: standard

The Ca de Bou or Perro de Presa Mallorquín is a Spanish breed of catch dog from Mallorca, the largest of the Balearic Islands.

== History ==
The Ca de Bou was historically kept on the island of Mallorca for the blood sports of bull-baiting and dog fighting. The breed may have developed during the period of Catalan influence over Mallorca between 1270 and 1570 AD, depriving from mastiff-type dogs used on the island for controlling cattle. By the time of the British occupation of Mallorca in the 18th century, both bull-baiting and dog fighting were well established on the island, and the Ca de Bou were favoured by the locals for these blood sports, being renowned for their ferocity and bravery.

With the outlawing of bull-baiting and dog fighting on Mallorca in the 20th century, the Ca de Bou lost favour and their numbers dwindled to the brink of extinction. The breed was saved by enthusiasts from mainland Spain who began exhibiting it; eventually it was recognised by the Real Sociedad Canina de España. It is known as the Perro de Presa Mallorquin in Spanish, in English as the Majorcan Bulldog or occasionally the Majorcan Mastiff; Ca de Bou is the Catalan language name.

The first breed standard was drawn up in 1932. The breed was definitively accepted by the Fédération Cynologique Internationale in 1963.

In 2026 it was among the sixteen Spanish breeds considered by the Real Sociedad Canina de España to be vulnerable.

== Description ==
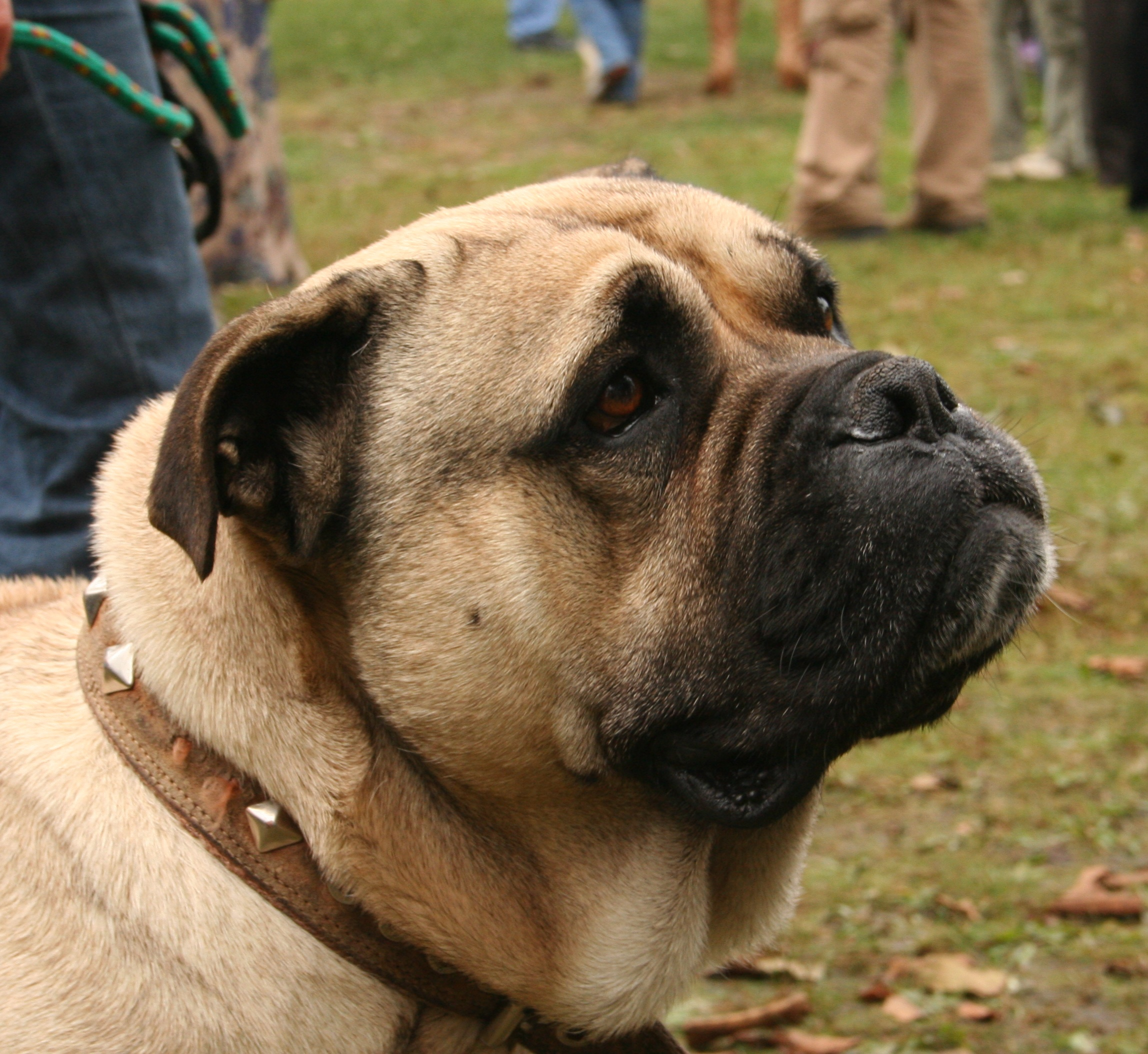
Massive head with a broad and powerful jaw

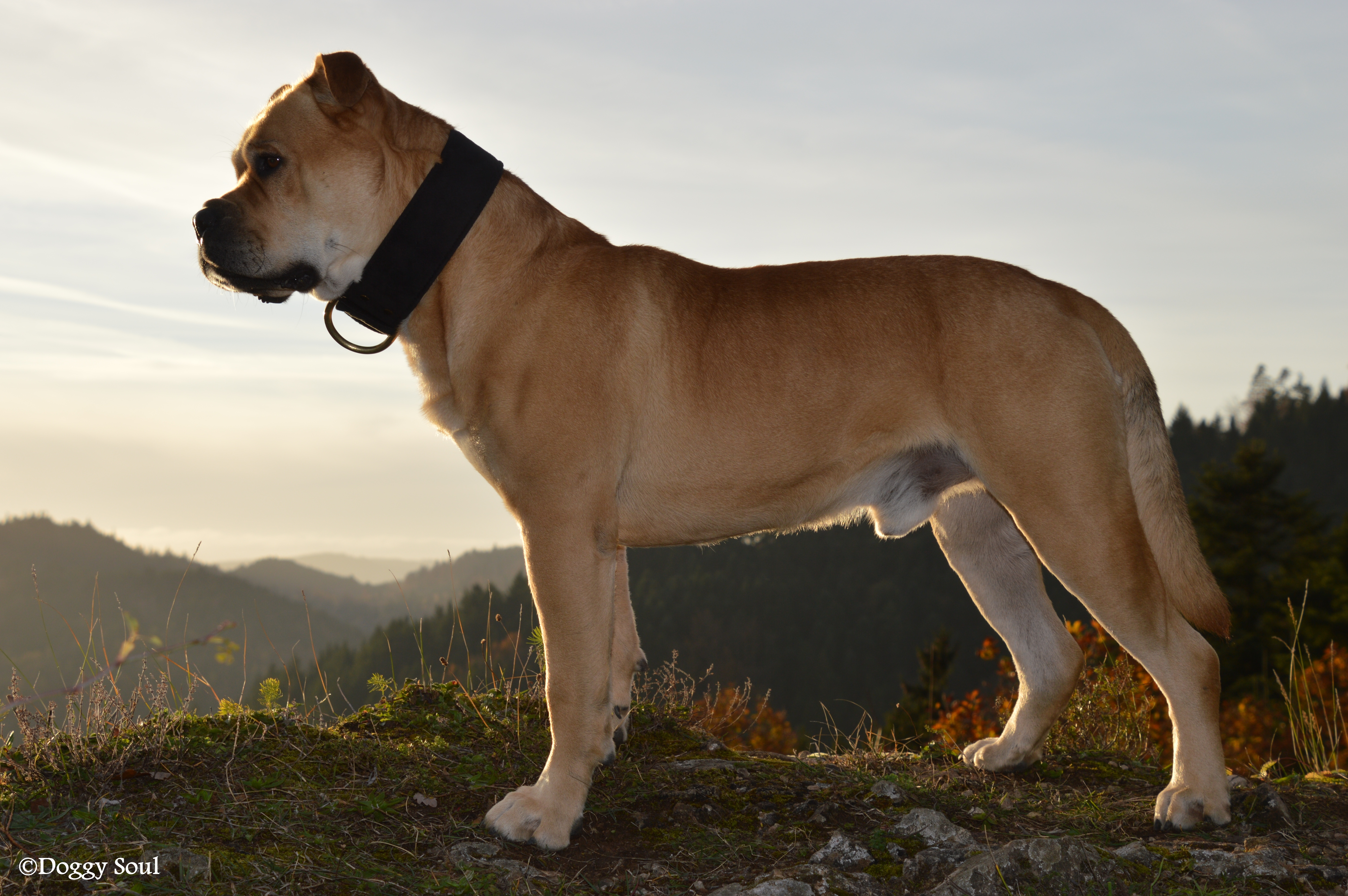
The coat of the Ca de Bou can be red, auburn or black.

The Ca de Bou is a very muscular dog of medium size. It typically stands between 52 and 58 centimetres (20 and 23 in). The breed standard states dogs should stand between 55 and 58 centimetres (22 and 23 in) and bitches between 52 and 55 centimetres (20 and 22 in); dogs weigh between 35 and 38 kilograms (77 and 84 lb), bitches between 30 and 34 kilograms (66 and 75 lb). The short and rough coat is typically brindle, fawn or black in colour.

The head is large, with a broad and powerful jaw well suited to gripping a bull or another dog in the fighting pit.

Life expectancy is typically 10 to 12 years.

== Character ==
Selective breeding for the show ring has softened the Ca de Bou's temperament, and they are now biddable and affectionate, although they retain the tenacity and alertness of their forebears.
