= Pastor Garafiano =

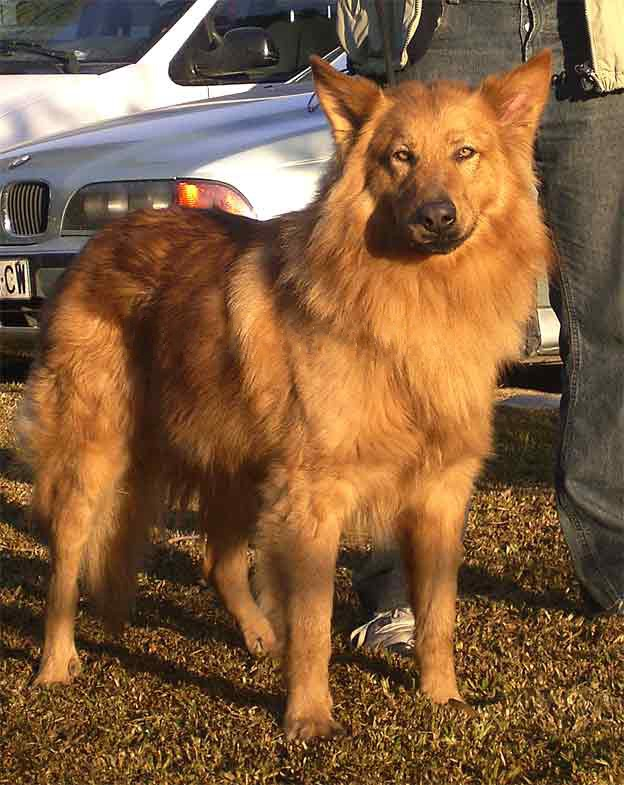
- Other names: Pastor de Garafía
- Origin: Spain
- Distribution: Canary Islands
Traits
Height	Males	57–65 cm
	Females	55–63 cm
Weight	Males	30–40 kg
	Females	24–30 kg
Kennel club standards
- Real Sociedad Canina de España: standard
- Notes: recognised in Spanish legislation

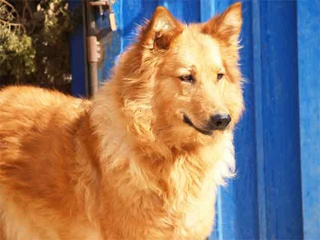

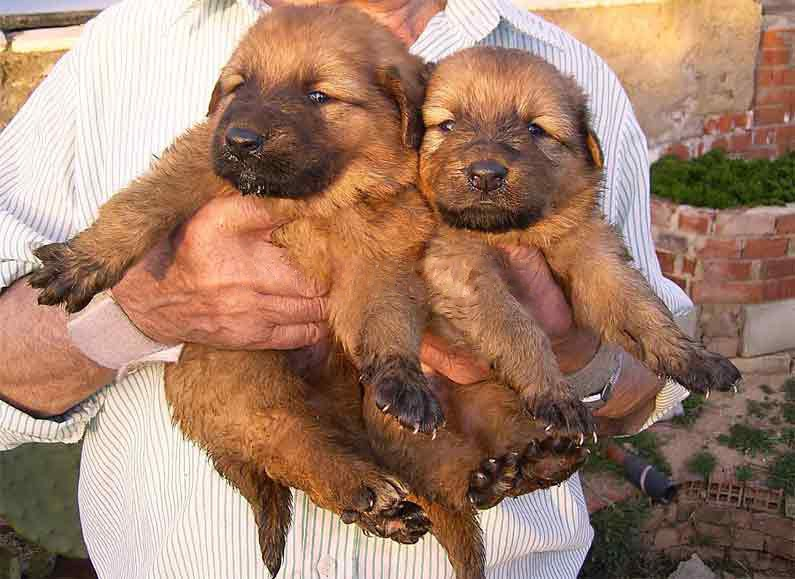
Puppies

The Pastor Garafiano is a Spanish breed of sheep dog native to the island of La Palma in the Canary Islands. The name derives from that of the comarca of Garafía, in the north of the island, where the breed was most common, although specimens can be found throughout the island. The breed was officially recognized by the Real Sociedad Canina de España in 2003.

== History ==
This is a distinct canine population. It is native to the comarca of Garafía, on the island of La Palma, where it was used by shepherds to herd goats. Because of this, the animal thrives in steep and rocky areas. It has heterogeneous characteristics, because there has only been performed a functional selection. Its core competency is the grazing of goats and sheep in rugged terrain, by the geography of La Palma. It originates to pre-Hispanic times, although crossings with other breeds (most importantly the Belgian shepherds) after the conquest contributed to the development of the Pastor Garafiano.

For a time, this breed was on the verge of disappearing due to out-crossing with other dog breeds. Successive crosses, especially in the 1960s with other herding breeds, demonstrated the necessity to work for its recovery and selection from the few pure specimens that shepherds of the island kept. A working group for the breed's conservation was formed in 1980; this later became the Asociación Española del Perro Pastor Garafiano.

In 2026 it was among the sixteen Spanish breeds considered by the Real Sociedad Canina de España to be vulnerable.

== Characteristics ==
The Garafiano is of medium size: bitches stand between 50 and 56 cm at the withers and weigh from 18 to 25 kg, dogs stand some 4 cm taller and weigh about 6 kg more. Height at the croup may be up to 3 cm greater than the height at the withers.
