= Ca Rater Mallorquí =

Spanish breed of dog

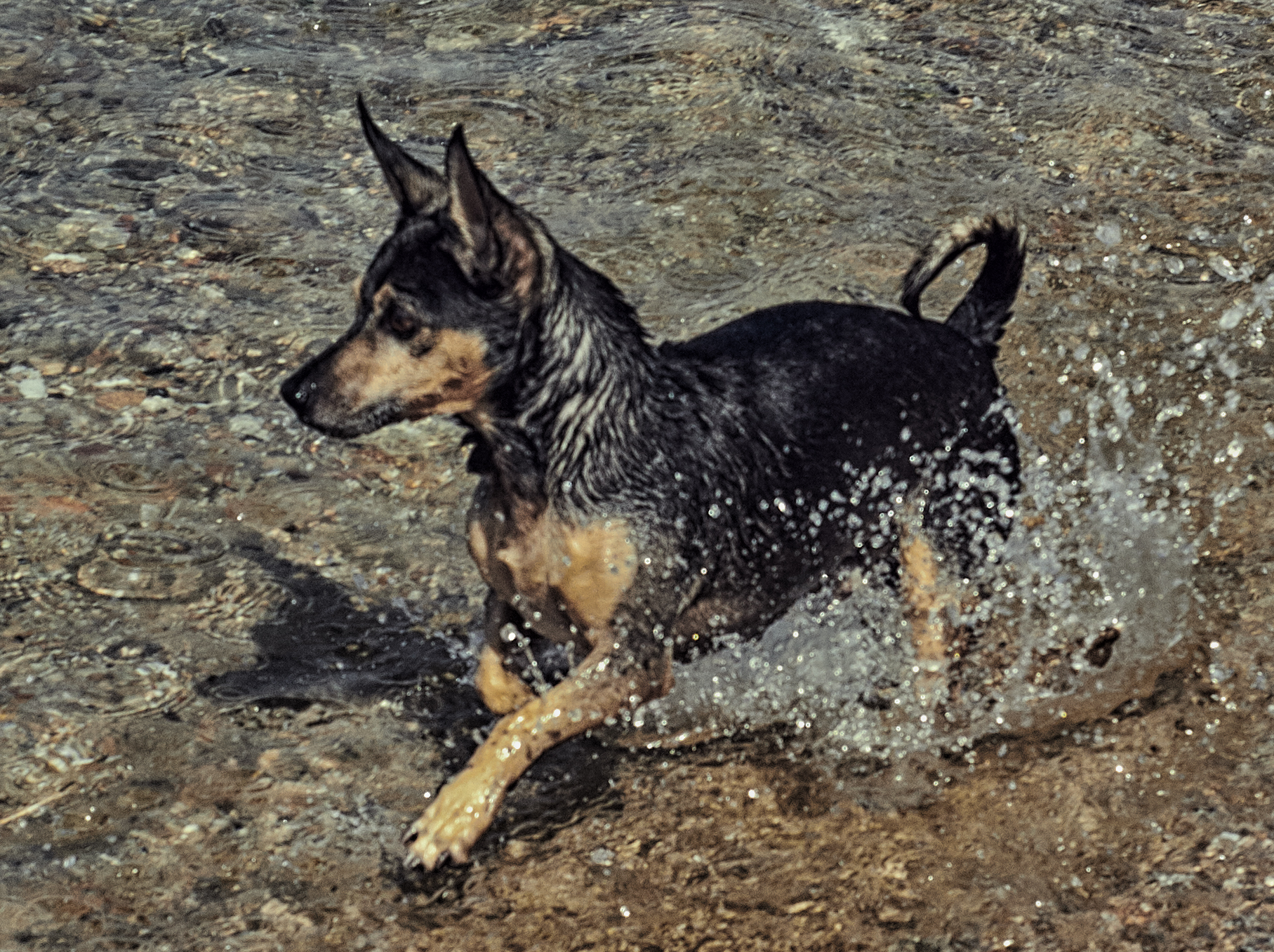

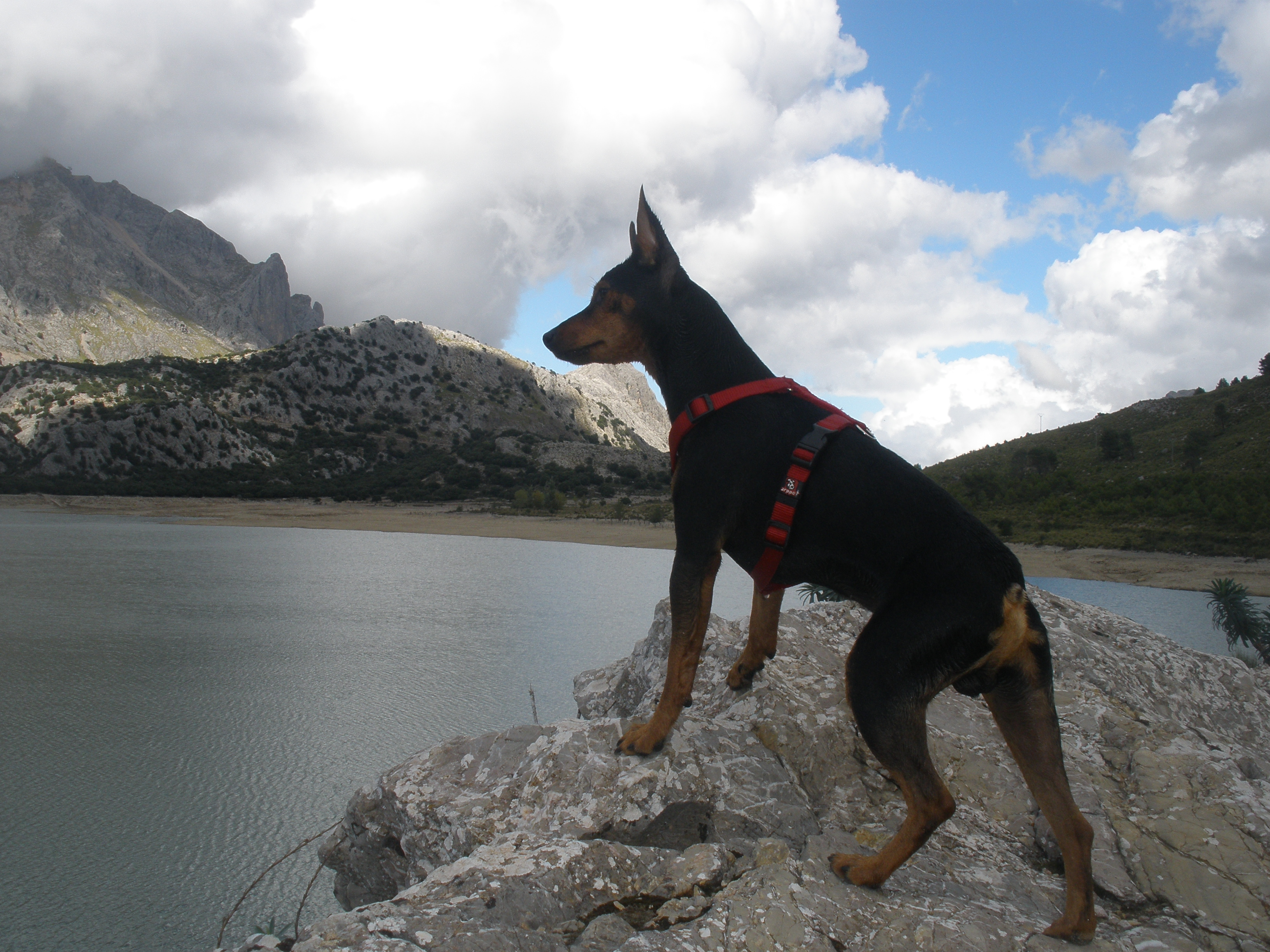
- Other names: Ratonero Mallorquín
- Origin: Spain
- Distribution: Mallorca, Balearic Islands
Traits
| Height | Males | 32–36 cm (13–14 in) |
| | Females | 29–33 cm (11–13 in) |
| Weight | Males | 3.5–5 kg (8–11 lb) |
| | Females | 3–4 kg (7–9 lb) |
- Coat: short
- Colour: black-and-tan, brown-and-tan, sometimes white patches or tri-colour
Kennel club standards
- Govern Illes Balears: standard
- Ministerio de Agricultura, Pesca y Alimentación: standard

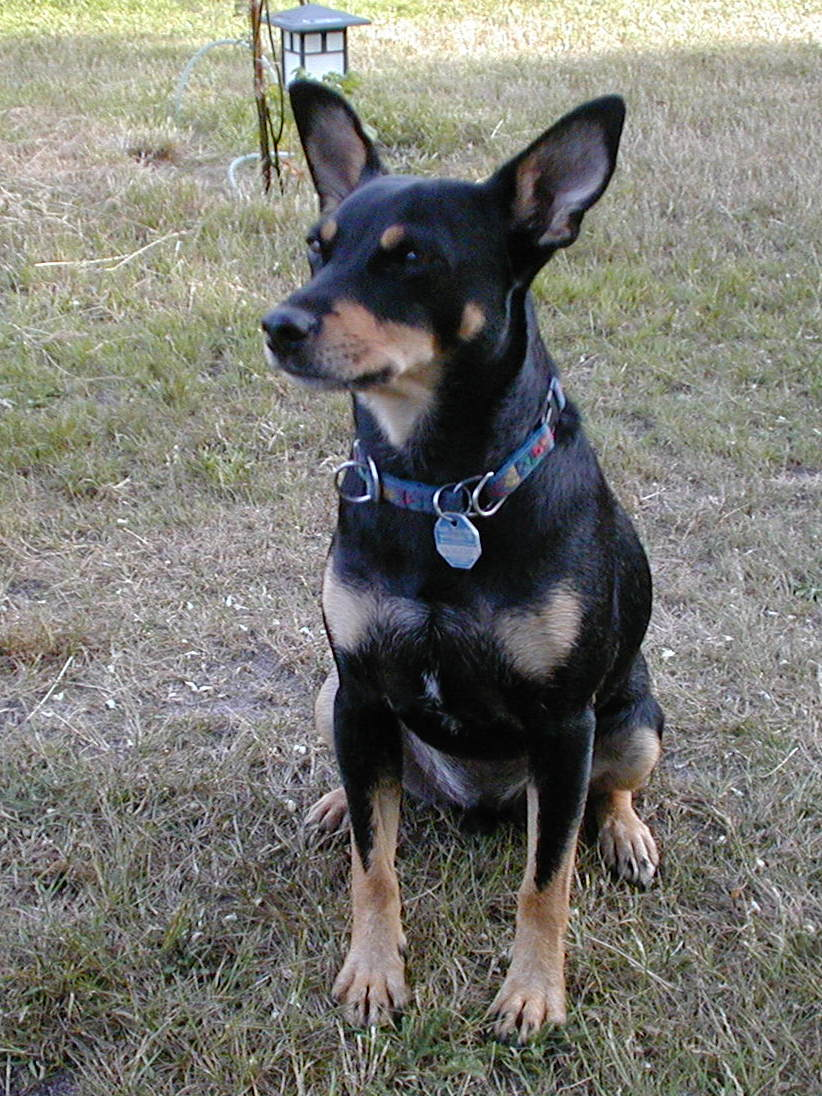

The Ca Rater Mallorquí or Spanish: Ratonero mallorquín is a Spanish breed of dog of ratter or warren hound type, found on the island of Mallorca in the Balearic Islands. It is recognised by the Govern Illes Balears and by the Spanish national government, but not by the Fédération Cynologique Internationale.

== History ==
The origins of the Ca Rater Mallorquí are unclear, with no documentary evidence before the second half of the nineteenth century. The dogs show considerable similarity to those of the Gos Rater Valencià breed of the autonomous community of Valencia, in mainland Spain. Valencian rice-farmers arrived in Mallorca in 1901 to work in the wetlands of the Albufera de Muro, and some sources cite this as a possible explanation for the similarity. It has also been suggested that there may have been some infusion of English terrier blood in the history of the breed.

A breed society – the Club Espanyol del Ca Rater Mallorquí – was established in 1990, and registrations were begun. The Ca Rater was officially recognised by the autonomous community of the Balearic Islands in 2002, with the establishment of a stud-book and the publication of the breed standard in the Butlletí Oficial de les Illes Balears, the government gazette of the islands. In 2004 it received full national recognition when the breed standard was published in the Boletín Oficial del Estado – the official journal of the government of Spain – and the breed society was authorised to maintain the stud-book.

== Characteristics ==
The Ca Rater is small: height at the withers does not reach 40 cm, and is usually in the range 29–33 cm for bitches and 32–36 cm for dogs; body weights vary from 3 to 4 kg and from 3.5 to 5 kg respectively. In dogs, the length of the body is roughly the same as the height at the withers, such that the outline of the body is square; bitches are somewhat longer in the body, but still close to square in outline.

The coat may be either black-and-tan or brown-and-tan, either with or without white markings; these may be so extensive that the coat is tri-coloured or is white with patches of colour.

== Use ==
The Ca Rater Mallorquí was formerly used to hunt and catch rats in the wetlands and lagoons of the island of Mallorca – the use for which it is named; this was a commercial activity, as rats were sold as food. In the twenty-first century it is commonly used to hunt rabbit, particularly in areas covered by thick scrub or vegetation; it may also be used to retrieve small feathered game such as thrushes or doves.

It is a good watchdog and a good companion animal.
