= Real Sociedad Canina de España =

Spanish kennel club

- Abbreviation: RSCFRCE
- Formation: 27 June 1911; 114 years ago
- Type: Kennel club
- Headquarters: Calle de Lagasca, 16; 28001 Madrid
- Location: Madrid, Spain
- Region served: Spain
- Official language: Spanish
- Website: rsce.es

La Real Sociedad Canina de España is the Spanish kennel club. It was founded in Madrid as the Sociedad Central de Fomento de las Razas Caninas en España on 27 June 1911, and became a legal entity on 12 July 1911; on 1 December 1911 it received the royal patronage of Alfonso XIII, and the word 'Real' was added before the name.

It has been a full member of the Federation Cynologique Internationale since 30 May 1912.

It has responsibility for the registration of all dogs in Spain.
