= Podengo Galego =

Spanish breed of dog

- Other names: Coeillero Galego
- Origin: Spain
- Distribution: Galicia, principally Ourense and Pontevedra
Traits
- Height: 42–52 cm
	Males	46–52 cm
	Females	42–46 cm
- Weight: 10-15 kg
- Colour: shades of tan, from sand to reddish; occasionally chocolate/liver
Kennel club standards
- MAPA (page 57, in Spanish): standard
- Xunta de Galicia (page 6332, in Galician): standard

The Podengo Galego is a traditional Spanish breed of warren hound from the autonomous community of Galicia in north-western Spain. It is recognised by the Ministerio de Agricultura, Pesca y Alimentación – the Spanish ministry of agriculture – and by the Xunta de Galicia, but not by the Real Sociedad Canina de España.

It is one of four traditional breeds of Galicia, the others being the Can de Palleiro, the Guicho or Quisquelo, and the Perdigueiro Galego. It is related to the medium-sized variety of the Podengo Português of northern Portugal.

== History ==
The Podengo Galego is a traditional breed of warren hound from the autonomous community of Galicia. It was officially recognised by the Xunta de Galicia in April 2001; it received national recognition by royal decree in May the same year. A stud-book was established at the same time; it is maintained by the breed society, the Club de Raza do Podengo Galego.

It is distributed throughout Galicia, but mainly in the provinces of Ourense and Pontevedra.

Its conservation status was described in 2009 as "in danger of extinction", but improving. A dog census in the comarcas of O Deza and Tabeirós – Terra de Montes in Pontevedra in 2024 found 1059 of the dogs, or about 7% of all dogs identified by breed in the census; in some concellos of the area – including A Estrada, Cerdedo-Cotobade and Dozón – it was among the three most numerous breeds of dog. In 2025 The Podengo was listed by the Real Sociedad Canina de España among the breeds in the process of recovery.

== Characteristics ==
The Podengo is of medium size and light build: body weights range from 10 to 15 kg, while heights at the withers are from 42 to 46 cm for bitches and 46 to 52 cm for dogs; bitches are somewhat more slender than dogs. The coat may be of any shade of tan, ranging from sand-coloured to reddish; a chocolate or liver coat is occasionally also seen.

== Use ==
The Podengo is a warren hound, used principally for hunting rabbit and hare, or occasionally for fox. It can also be trained to hunt feathered game such as partridge, quail or woodcock.
