= Lalín =

- Municipality
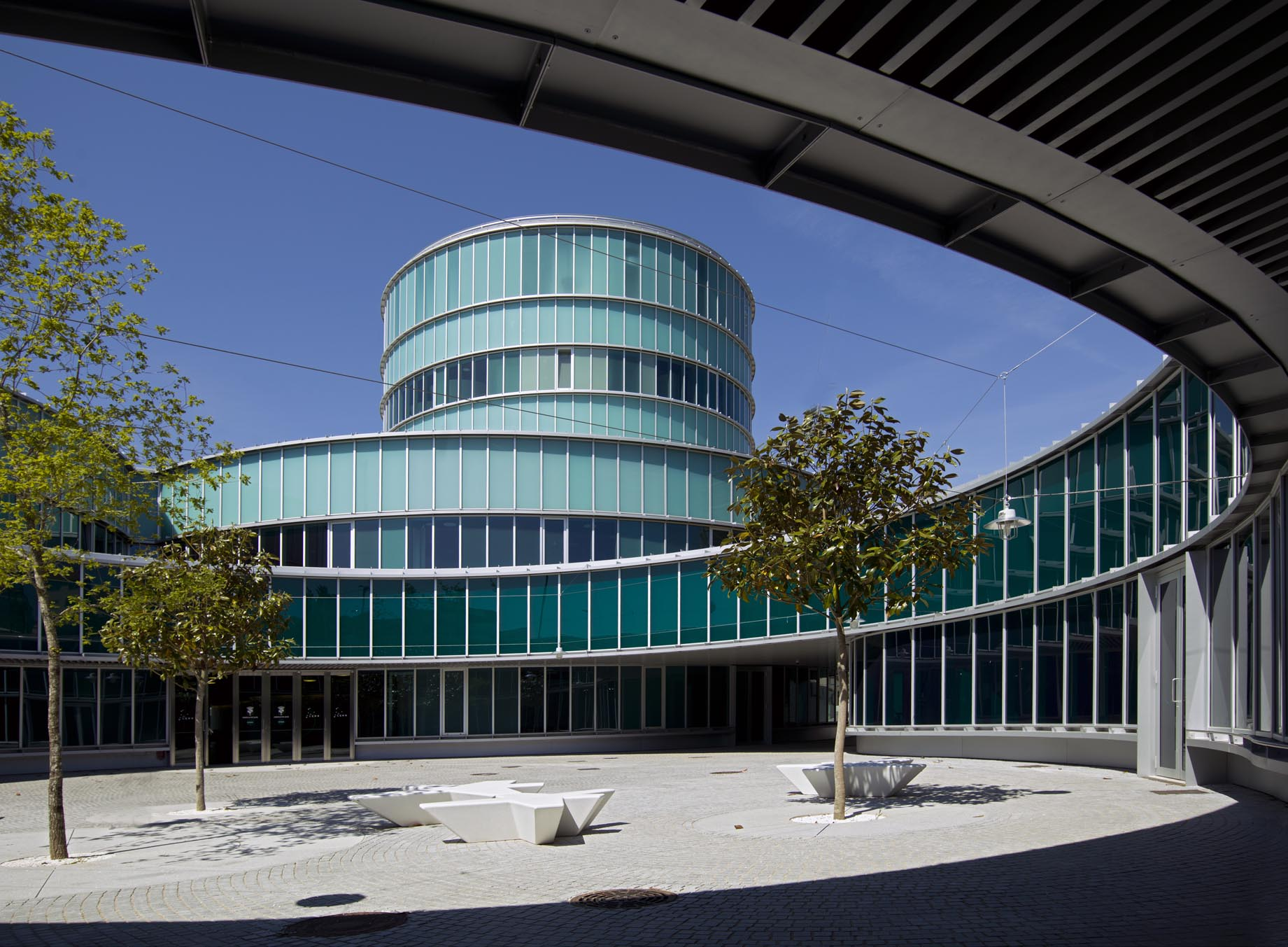
- City Hall

- Flag Coat of arms
- Interactive map of Lalín
- Coordinates: 42°39′N 8°7′W
- Country: Spain
- Autonomous community: Galicia
- Province: Pontevedra
- Comarca: O Deza

Government
  - Alcalde: José Crespo (PPdeG)

Area
  - Total: 326.83 km^{2} (126.19 sq mi)

Population (2025-01-01)
  - Total: 20,292
  - Density: 62.087/km^{2} (160.81/sq mi)
- Demonym: Lalinense
- Time zone: UTC+1 (CET)
  - Summer (DST): UTC+2 (CEST)
- Postal code: 36500
- Website: www.lalin.gal

Lalín is a municipality in the north of the province of Pontevedra, in the autonomous community of Galicia, Spain. It is the capital of the comarca of O Deza.

The town has a population of 20,158 inhabitants (2014). The surface of the municipality is 326.8 km^{2}, being the biggest municipality in the province of Pontevedra and the fourth of Galicia, with a population density of 63.85 inhabitants/km^{2}.

Located in the northeast of the province of Pontevedra; being bordered by Silleda and Vila de Cruces to the northwest, Forcarei to the west, Agolada and Rodeiro to the northeast, Dozón to the southeast and O Irixo to the south, all of them being part of the region of Deza, except Forcarei and O Irixo.

== International relations ==
=== Twin towns – Sister cities ===
Lalín is twinned with:

- Cabeceiras de Basto, Portugal
- Lalinde, France
- Linden, Germany
- Linden (Cuijk), Netherlands
- Lubbeek, Belgium
- Sankt Georgen am Walde, Austria

== See also ==
- List of municipalities in Pontevedra
