= Guicho =

Spanish breed of dog

- Other names: Quisquelo; Can Guicho; Coeillero
- Origin: Spain
- Distribution: Galicia, principally Ourense and Pontevedra
Traits
Height	Males	34–42
	Females	30–38
Weight	Males	8–10 kg
	Females	6–8 kg
- Colour: solid colours, from sand to chocolate or liver; bi-coloured or tri-coloured; sable
Kennel club standards
- MAPA (page 61, in Spanish): standard
- Xunta de Galicia (page 6341, in Galician): standard

The Guicho or Quisquelo, also Can Guicho, is a traditional Spanish breed of small warren hound from the autonomous community of Galicia in north-western Spain. It is recognised by the Ministerio de Agricultura, Pesca y Alimentación – the Spanish ministry of agriculture – and by the Xunta de Galicia, but not by the Real Sociedad Canina de España.

It is one of four traditional dog breeds of Galicia, the others being the Can de Palleiro, the Perdigueiro Galego and the Podengo Galego.

== History ==
The Guicho is a traditional breed of warren hound from the autonomous community of Galicia. It was officially recognised by the Xunta de Galicia in April 2001; it received national recognition by royal decree in May the same year. A stud-book was established at the same time; it is maintained by the breed society, the Club de Raza do Can Guicho ou Quisquelo.

The Guicho is distributed throughout Galicia, but mainly in the provinces of Ourense and Pontevedra.

Until its recognition in 2001 it was close to extinction. Its conservation status was described in 2009 as "in danger of extinction", but improving. A dog census in the comarcas of O Deza and Tabeirós – Terra de Montes in Pontevedra in 2024 found 309 of the dogs, or about 2% of all dogs identified by breed in the census. In 2025 the Guicho was listed by the Real Sociedad Canina de España among the breeds in the process of recovery.

== Characteristics ==
The Guicho is small dog: body weights range from 6 to 8 kg for bitches and 8 to 10 kg for dogs, and heights at the withers vary from 30 to 38 cm for bitches and 34 to 42 cm for dogs; bites are generally rather smaller and more slender than dogs. The coat may be solid-coloured, ranging from sand-coloured to chocolate or liver; or it may be bi-coloured, tri-coloured or sable.

== Use ==
The Guicho is a warren hound and is used principally for hunting rabbit in the mountains of Galicia. It may also be used to hunt fox, or to detect the presence of wild boar.
