= A Xesta =

- Village
- Interactive map of A Xesta
- Coordinates: 42.618°N 8.116°W
- Region: Spain
- Autonomous community: Galicia
- Province: Pontevedra
- Comarca: O Deza
- Judicial district: Lalín

Area
  - Total: 5 km^{2} (1.9 sq mi)

Population (2011)
  - Total: 252
- Time zone: UTC+1 (CET)
  - Summer (DST): UTC+2 (CET)

San Fiz da Xesta is a village and parish in the region of Lalín, which is in the province of Pontevedra, Galicia. In 2011 the population was 252 residents (127 men and 125 women), which was a decrease from 1999 when it had 271 inhabitants.

The local church of Saint Fiz is the main attraction in the village.
