= Escuadro =

Escuadro could refer to one of the following locations in Spain

- Escuadro (Zamora, Spain)
- Escuadro (Pontevedra, Spain)
