= Podengo Canario =

Podengo Canario may refer to:

- Podenco Canario, a hunting dog from the Canary Islands
- Portuguese Podengo, a hunting dog from Portugal
