= Ibizan Hound =

Ibizan Hound Ca Eivissenc Podenco Ibicenco
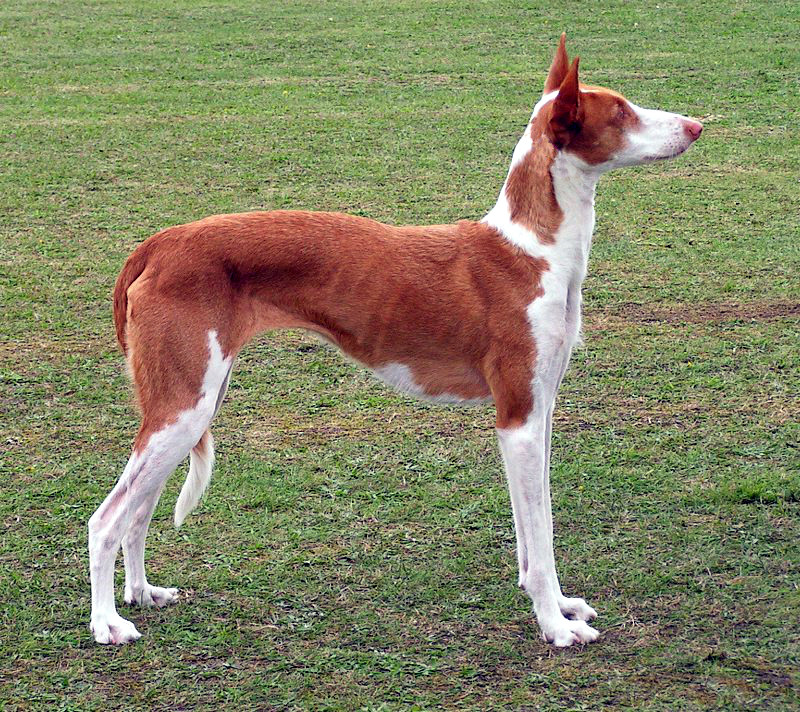
- Ibizan Hound.
- Other names: Ibizan Hound; Ibizan Warren Hound
- Origin: Ibiza, (Balearic Islands, Spain)
Kennel club standards
- RSCFRCE: standard
- Fédération Cynologique Internationale: standard

The Ibizan Hound (Spanish: podenco ibicenco, Catalan: ca eivissenc) is a lean, agile dog of the hound family. There are two hair types of the breed: smooth and wire. The more commonly seen type is the smooth.

== Appearance ==
The Ibizan Hound is an elegant and agile breed, with an athletic and attractive outline and a ground-covering springy trot. Though graceful in appearance, it has good bone girth and is a rugged/hardy breed. Its large upright ears — a hallmark of the breed — are broad at the base and frame a long and elegant headpiece. The neck is long and lean. It has a unique front assembly with well laid-back shoulders and relatively straight upper arm. Coming in both smooth and wire-coated varieties, their coat is a combination of red and white with the nose, ears, eye rims, and pads of feet being a light tan color. Its eyes are a striking amber color and have an alert and intelligent expression. The Ibizan may range in height, from 23 to 27 inches at the withers for males while females are 22 to 26 inches at the withers. The average weight of males is 50 lbs (22.6 kg) while the average weight of females is 45 lbs (20.4 kg).

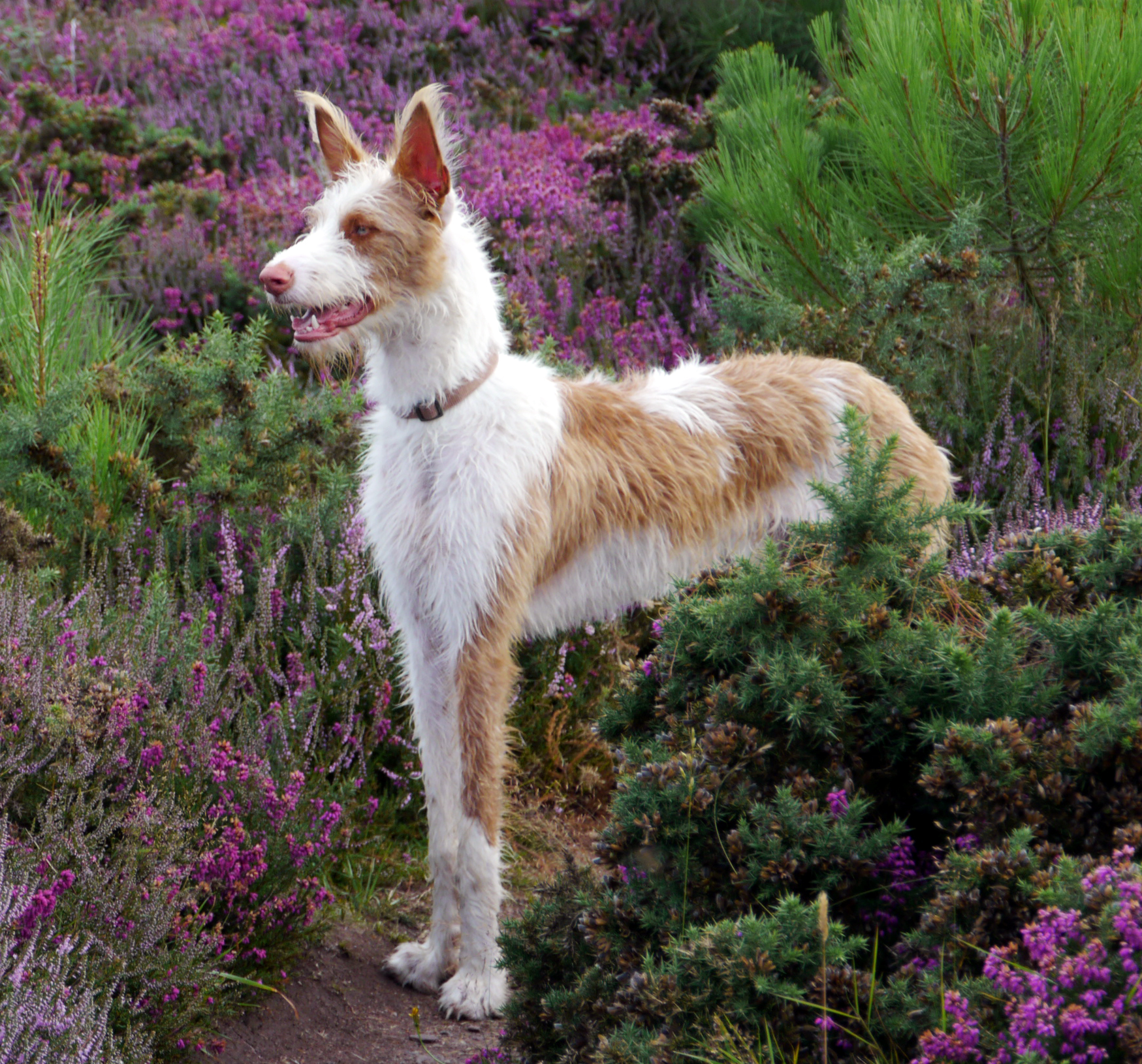
Wirehaired ibizan hound

== Temperament ==
Ibizan Hounds are intelligent, active, and engaging by nature. They rank 53rd in Stanley Coren's book The Intelligence of Dogs, considered average working/obedience intelligence, but many Ibizan owners enjoy recounting a multitude of examples of their problem-solving abilities. They are true "clowns" of the dog world, delighting in entertaining their people with their antics. Though somewhat independent and stubborn at times, they do take well to training if positive methods are used, but they will balk at punitive training methods. They are generally quiet but will alarm bark if necessary, so they make good watch dogs. They are sensitive hounds, and very good around children and other dogs alike. They generally make good house dogs but are active and athletic, therefore need a lot of daily exercise. They do not make good kennel dogs. Ibizan hounds are sweet, but they are very stubborn and independent.

Ibizan Hounds are "escapologists": they are able to jump incredible heights from a standstill, so they need very tall fences. They also have been known to climb, and many can escape from crates and can open baby gates and even locks. They have a strong prey drive, therefore they cannot be trusted off leash unless in a safely enclosed area. Once off the leash, they might not come back for a long time. A hound that knows where its home is and the surrounding area will usually return unscathed.

== Health ==
The Ibizan Hound is typical of the hound group in that it rarely suffers from hereditary illness. Minor health concerns for the breed include seizures and allergies; very rarely, one will see axonal dystrophy, cataract, retinal dysplasia and deafness in the breed. Ibizan Hound owners should have their dogs' eyes tested by a veterinarian before breeding. CERF and BAER testing is recommended for the breed. Ibizan Hounds are sensitive to barbiturate anesthesia, and typically live between 12 and 14 years.

== History ==
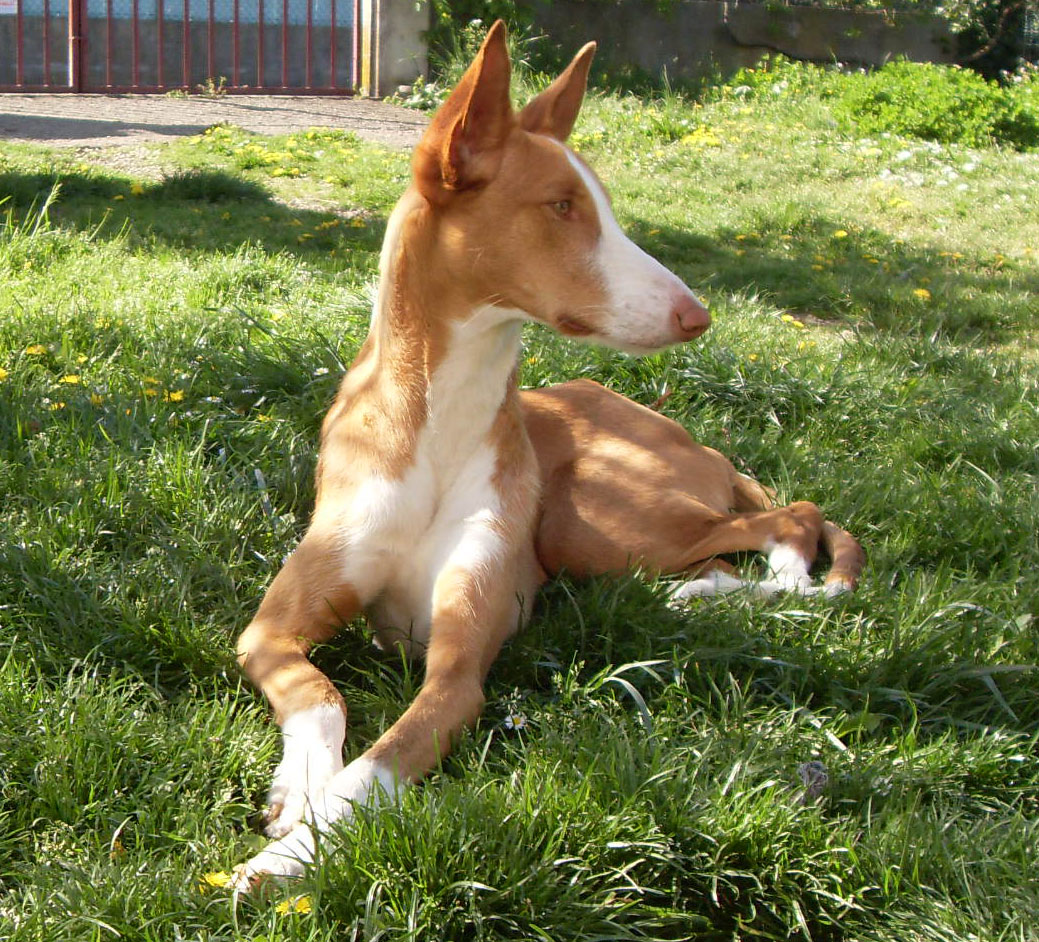
Female Ibizan Hound

DNA analysis indicates that the breed was formed recently from other breeds.

The Ibizan Hound is similar in function and type to several breeds, such as the Pharaoh Hound, the Cirneco dell'Etna, the Portuguese Podengo, and the Podenco Canario. The Ibizan Hound is the largest of these breeds, classified by the Fédération Cynologique Internationale as primitive types.

== Use ==
This breed originates in the island of Ibiza and has been traditionally used in the Catalan-speaking areas of Spain, and France where it was known under the name of le charnigue, to hunt rabbits and other small game. The Ibizan Hound is a fast dog that can hunt on all types of terrain, working by scent, sound and sight. Hunters run these dogs in mostly female packs, with perhaps a male or two, as the female is considered the better hunter.

Traditionally a farmer may have one dog and a very well off farmer two dogs to catch rabbits for food. However, in the last twenty years it is seen as a sport where between five and fifteen dogs can be seen in the chase of one rabbit.

The Ibizan Hound authority Miquel Rosselló has provided a detailed description of a working trial which characterises their typical hunting technique and action, strikingly illustrated with action photos by Charles Camberoque which demonstrate hunt behaviour and typical hunt terrain. While local hunters will at times use one dog or a brace, and frequently packs of six to eight or as many as fifteen, the working trial requires an evaluation of one or two braces. A brace is called a colla. The couples should be tested on at least two to five rabbits (not hares), without the use of any other hunting aid. An inspection and evaluation of the exterior, fitness, character and obedience of the dogs is recommended prior to the hunt. The trial is qualified as having 5 parts. The dogs should show: (1) careful tracking and scenting of the rabbit, without being distracted in the least, 0-30 points; (2) correct signalling of the game, patient stand, strong jump into the air, obedience 0-10 points; (3) chase, giving tongue, speed, sureness, anticipation 0-30 points; (4) putting the game to cover at close quarters, listening, waiting, obedience, correct attack 0-10 point; and (5) good catch, or correct indication of the game's location, retrieval, obedience 0-20 points.

Individual dogs are expected to show a great degree of discipline, obedience and co-operation. They should be extremely agile, have good speed and a powerful vertical jump from a stationary position in rough and often heavily covered ground. They should have excellent scent-tracking abilities, give tongue at the right time when approaching the game closely, and otherwise be silent so that they can locate the game by sound.

In the United States, the Ibizan Hound is frequently competed in lure coursing through the AKC and ASFA, and also competes in LGRA straight racing and NOTRA oval track racing. Some parts of the country also use them for coursing live prey, generally jackrabbits.

The Ibizan Hound breed is recognized by the Fédération Cynologique Internationale, Continental Kennel Club, American Kennel Club, United Kennel Club, Kennel Club of Great Britain, Canadian Kennel Club, National Kennel Club, New Zealand Kennel Club, Australian National Kennel Council, America's Pet Registry, and American Canine Registry. It was fully recognized by the American Kennel Club in 1979.

== In folk culture ==
According to journalist Norman Lewis, when an owner no longer wants to own one of these dogs (having too much of an appetite, for instance), it is considered very bad luck to kill the dog. Instead, they release the dog on the other side of the island, so that someone else might 'adopt' the animal.

== See also ==
- List of dog breeds
