= O Foxo, Silleda =

O Foxo
- Interactive map of O Foxo
- Coordinates: 42.7°N 8.233333°W
- Time zone: UTC+1 (CET)
  - Summer (DST): UTC+2 (CET)

O Foxo is a place in the parish of Silleda, in Pontevedra. In 2007 it had a population of 54 people, 26 of whom were men and 28 were women. This represents a decrease in the number of people since the year 2000. It is the former capital of the county.
