= Perdigueiro Galego =

Spanish breed of dog

- Origin: Spain
- Foundation stock: Bracco Italiano
Traits
- Height: 50–60 cm (20–24 in)
	Males	55 to 60 cm (22 to 24 in)
	Females	50 to 55 cm (20 to 22 in)
- Weight: 20 to 30 kg (45 to 65 lb)
- Coat: short
- Colour: bicolour or tricolour; white with chestnut, orange, cinnamon and/or black; also solid brown, yellow or black
Kennel club standards
- Xunta de Galicia: standard
- Ministerio de Agricultura, Pesca y Alimentación, Spain: standard
- Notes: recognised in Spanish legislation

The Perdigueiro Galego is a rare Spanish breed of pointer from the autonomous community of Galicia in north-western Spain. It is one of four traditional breeds of the region, the others being the Can de Palleiro, the Guicho or Quisquelo, and the Podengo Galego. It is recognised by the Ministerio de Agricultura, Pesca y Alimentación – the Spanish ministry of agriculture – and by the Xunta de Galicia, but not by the Real Sociedad Canina de España.

== History ==
The Perdigueiro Galego – like other regional pointer breeds such as the Old Spanish Pointer, the Portuguese Pointer, the Pachón Navarro and the Braque Français – descends from dogs of Bracco Italiano type imported into north-western Iberia and south-western France several centuries ago, all developing into distinct types according to the preferences and requirements of local sportsmen.

The Perdigueiro Galego was formerly commonly found in the municipalities of A Mezquita, Viana do Bolo, Riós, Laza and A Veiga in the Galician Province of Ourense. From the 1970s onward, foreign breeds of pointer became available to Spanish hunters and numbers of the Perdigueiro Galego went into decline; this was compounded by a decline in partridge numbers throughout the Galician Massif. To prevent the extinction of the breed, the best surviving specimens were identified and recorded, particularly from the provinces of Ourense and Lugo, but also in A Coruña and Pontevedra. A stud-book for the breed was established in 2001; it is managed by the Club de Raza do Perdigueiro Galego.

== Characteristics ==
The Perdigueiro Galego is a medium-sized breed of pointer: it weighs between 20 and 30 kg and stands between 50 and 60 cm; the breed shows a considerable degree of sexual dimorphism, with recommended heights for dogs 5 cm greater than those for bitches. The breed has a short dense coat, which may be spotted or mottled bicoloured or tricoloured with any of chestnut, orange, cinnamon and black on white; solid brown, yellow or black examples are also found.

== Use ==
It is a versatile pointing breed, used to hunt and point to game, and then to retrieve it once shot by the hunter. It is used predominantly to hunt game birds, in particular partridge, quail and woodcock, although it is also used to hunt small ground game such as hare and rabbit.
