= Pharaoh Hound =

Maltese breed of hunting dog

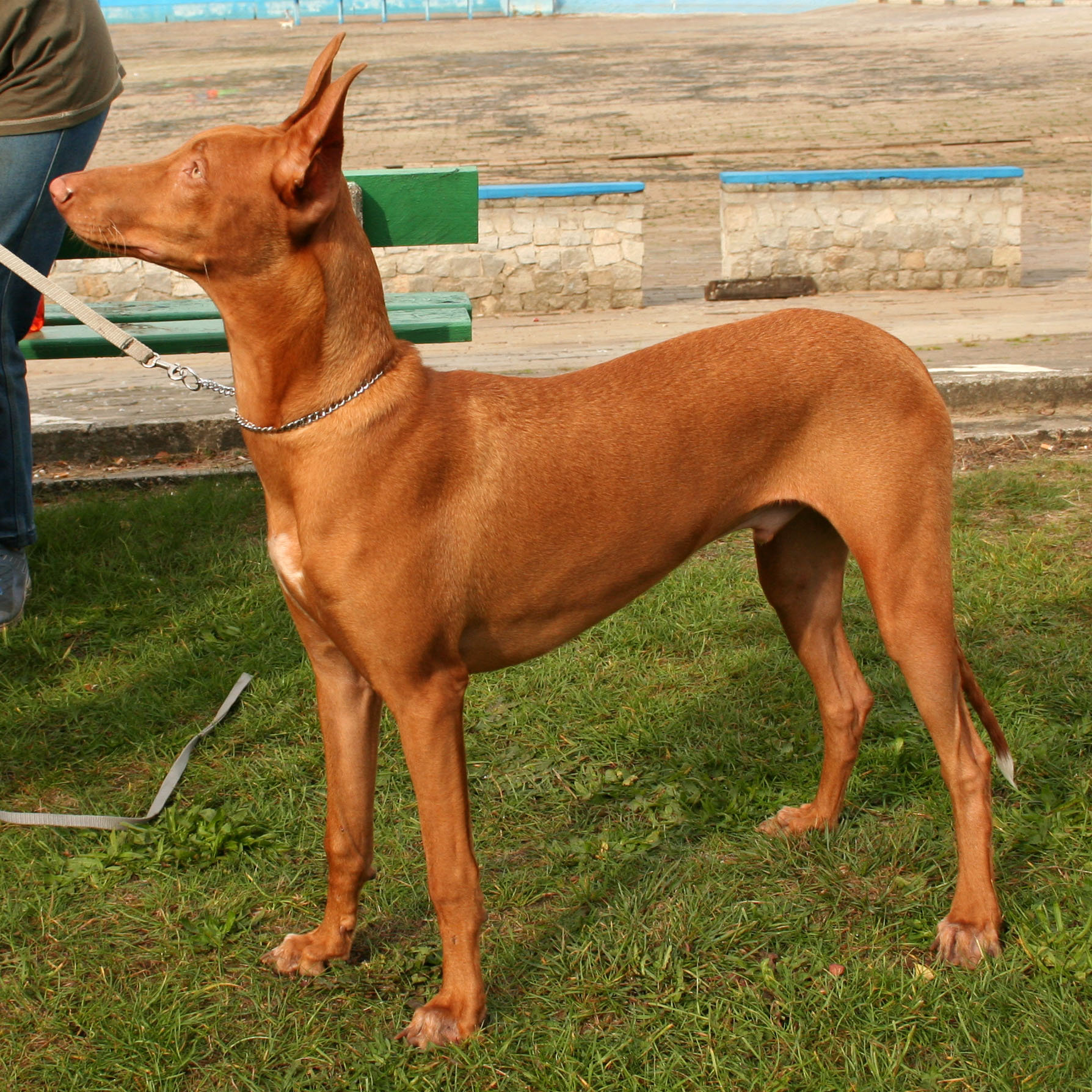

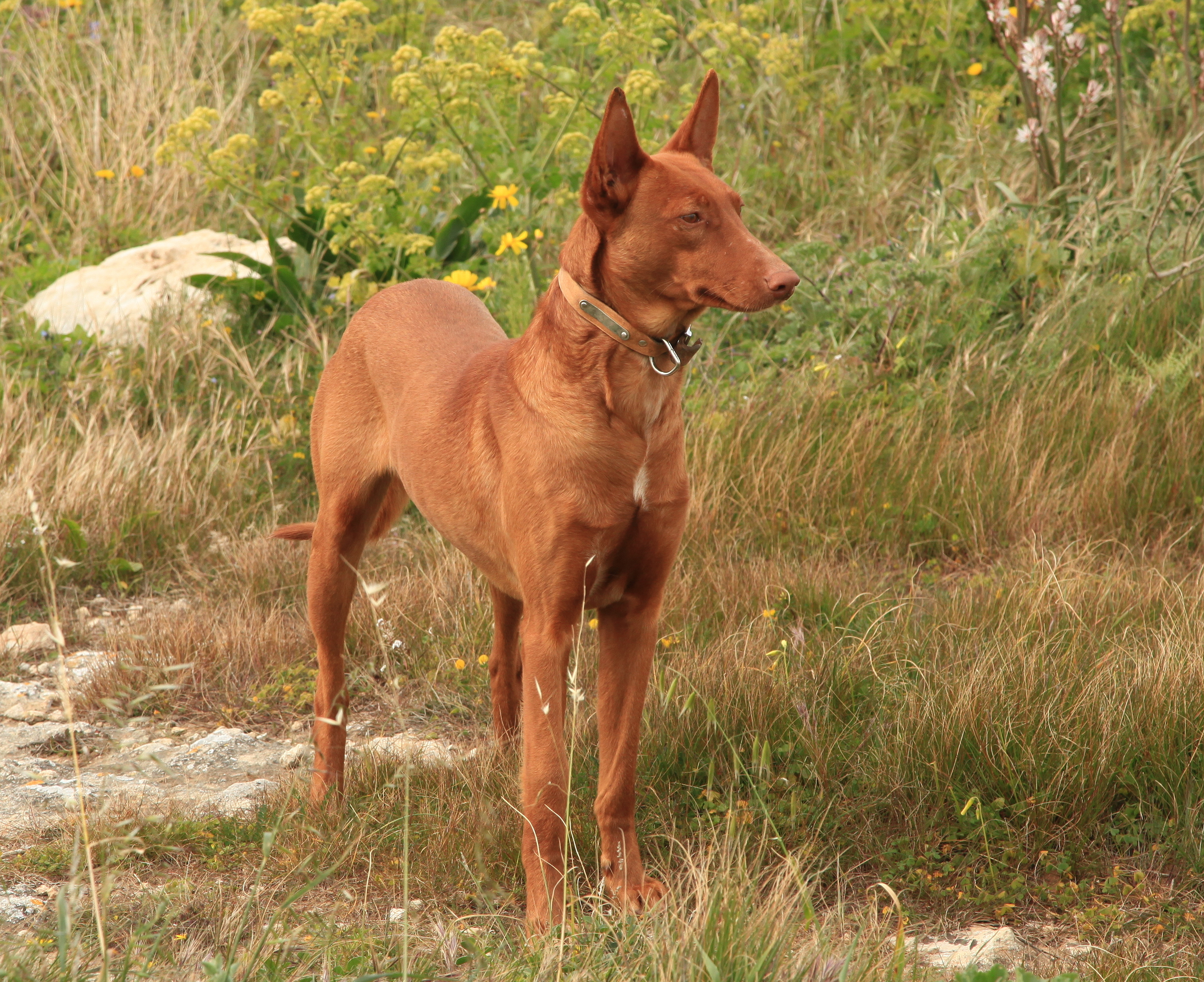
- Other names: Maltese: Kelb tal-Fenek
- Origin: Malta
Traits
Height	Males	56–64 cm
	Females	53–61 cm
Kennel club standards
- Fédération Cynologique Internationale: standard

The Pharaoh Hound or Kelb tal-Fenek is a Maltese breed of warren hound. It is traditionally used for rabbit-hunting in the rocky terrain of the islands; the Maltese name means "rabbit dog".

It is classified by the Fédération Cynologique Internationale in its "Spitz and primitive" group, and shows similarities to other Mediterranean breeds in that group such as the Cirneco dell'Etna, the Podenco Andaluz, the Podenco Canario, the Podenco Ibicenco and the Portuguese Podengo. It is the only Maltese dog breed with international recognition. (Note: The Maltese toy dog breed has no verified connection with the Maltese islands.)

== History ==
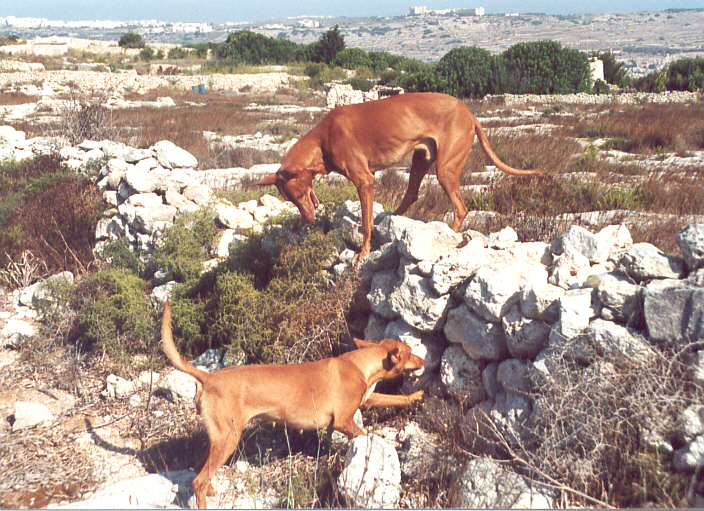
Hunting in a rubble stone wall in Malta. The dogs are indicating; enabling the hunter to put a ferret there

The Kelb tal-Fenek is a traditional breed of rural Malta. As the English-language exonym suggests, it is sometimes claimed that the Pharaoh Hound descends from the dogs shown in the tomb paintings of Ancient Egypt. A study in 2023 of seven Mediterranean breeds of warren hound found the Kelb tal-Fenek to have the greatest genetic distance of the group from the street dogs of Egypt. Other DNA studies suggest that the breed is not of ancient origin, but a moderately recent development; it apparently became genetically distinct from the Cirneco dell'Etna of Sicily no more than two hundred years ago.

In 1647 Giovanni Francesco Abela, in his Della Descrittione di Malta isola nel Mare Siciliano: con le sue antichità, ed altre notizie, wrote "... we have the dogs called Cernechi, much valued for rabbit-hunting, which are often in demand as far away as France, mainly for [use in] steep and stony mountain terrain". Some have taken this to refer to the Kelb tal-Fenek. The modern Cirneco is a Sicilian breed of similar structure and appearance to the Kelb tal-Fenek, but somewhat smaller.

The first litter to be born outside Malta was in the United Kingdom in 1963. The breed was accepted by the Fédération Cynologique Internationale as the "Pharaoh Hound" in the same year, under the patronage of the UK. A breed standard was approved by the British Kennel Club in 1974.

== Characteristics ==
The Kelb tal-Fenek is slender and graceful. The head is long and finely chiselled, with a slight stop. The coat is glossy and short. It may be chestnut or tan; white patches on the back, sides, shoulder or back of the neck are a disqualifying characteristic, but the tip of the tail may be white. The eyes are amber-coloured. The dogs have an unusual trait of "blushing" when excited or happy, with their ears and noses becoming bright pink.

It has little genetic pre-disposition to disease, and may be expected to live for some 11 to 14 years.

== Use ==
The Kelb tal-Fenek is usually taken out to hunt at night when there are fewer distractions. Generally, the hunters take their dogs into the countryside and release pairs of a male and a female dog in each compass direction. The dogs then search out their prey using scent. When a rabbit is found the hounds give chase, the small and more agile female in the lead with the male keeping the rabbit from darting too far to the sides. At this point the dogs giving chase emit a high pitched bark, attracting the other dogs and the hunters, all of whom come running. By the time the hunters and other dogs arrive the rabbit has almost always gone to ground. The hunters then gather and leash all but one dog, then place nets over all of the likely escape holes of the rabbit. Finally the hunter takes a ferret (with a small bell attached) from a round wicker basket, and places it into the last entrance to the rabbit's burrow. The Kelb tal-Fenek can hear the little bell up to 3 metres down under the rocky terrain. When the ferret flushes the rabbit out a hole, one free dog swoops down upon it. The use of ferrets is mentioned by Strabo about rabbit-hunting in the Balearic Islands under Roman rule.
