= Can de Palleiro =

Spanish breed of dog

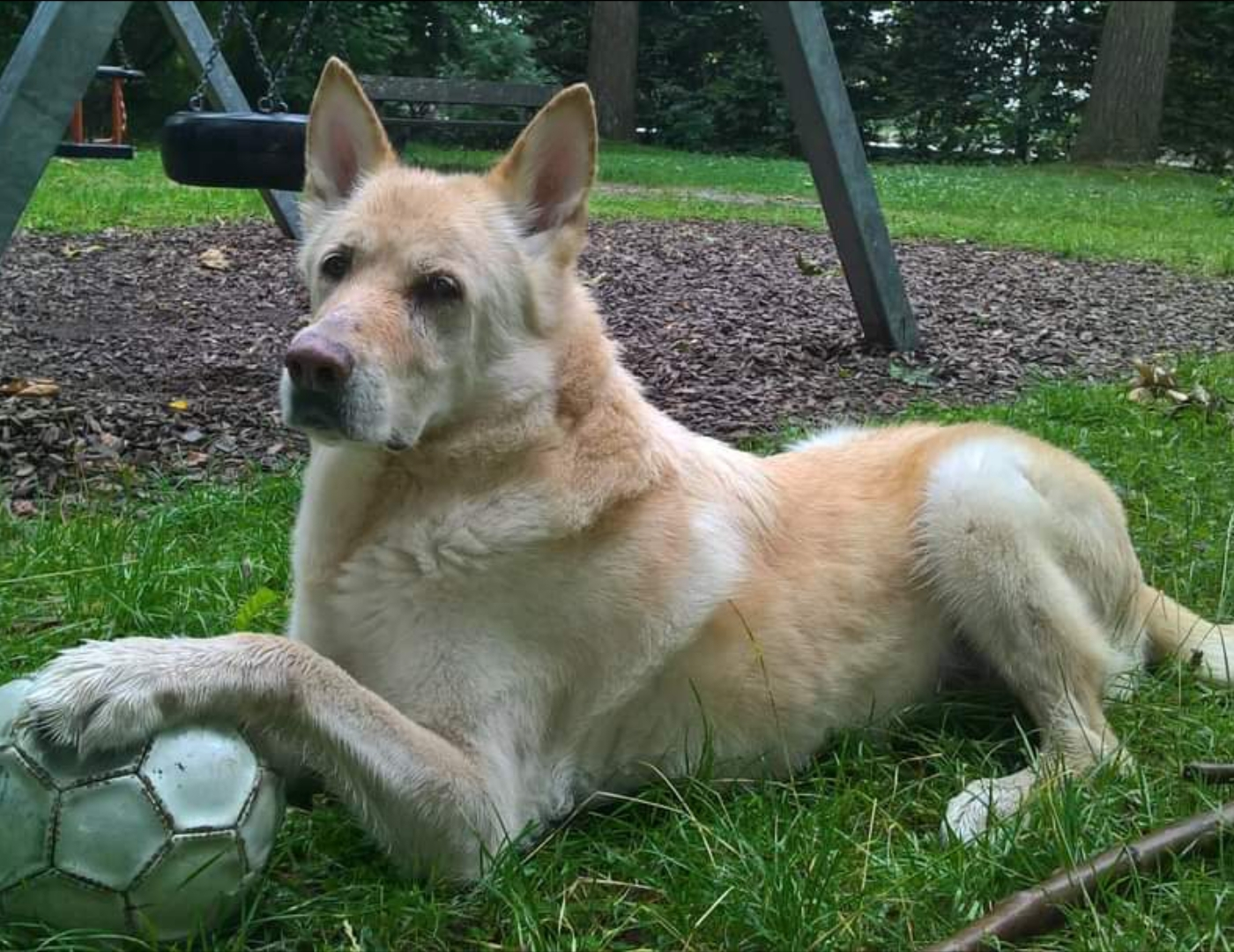

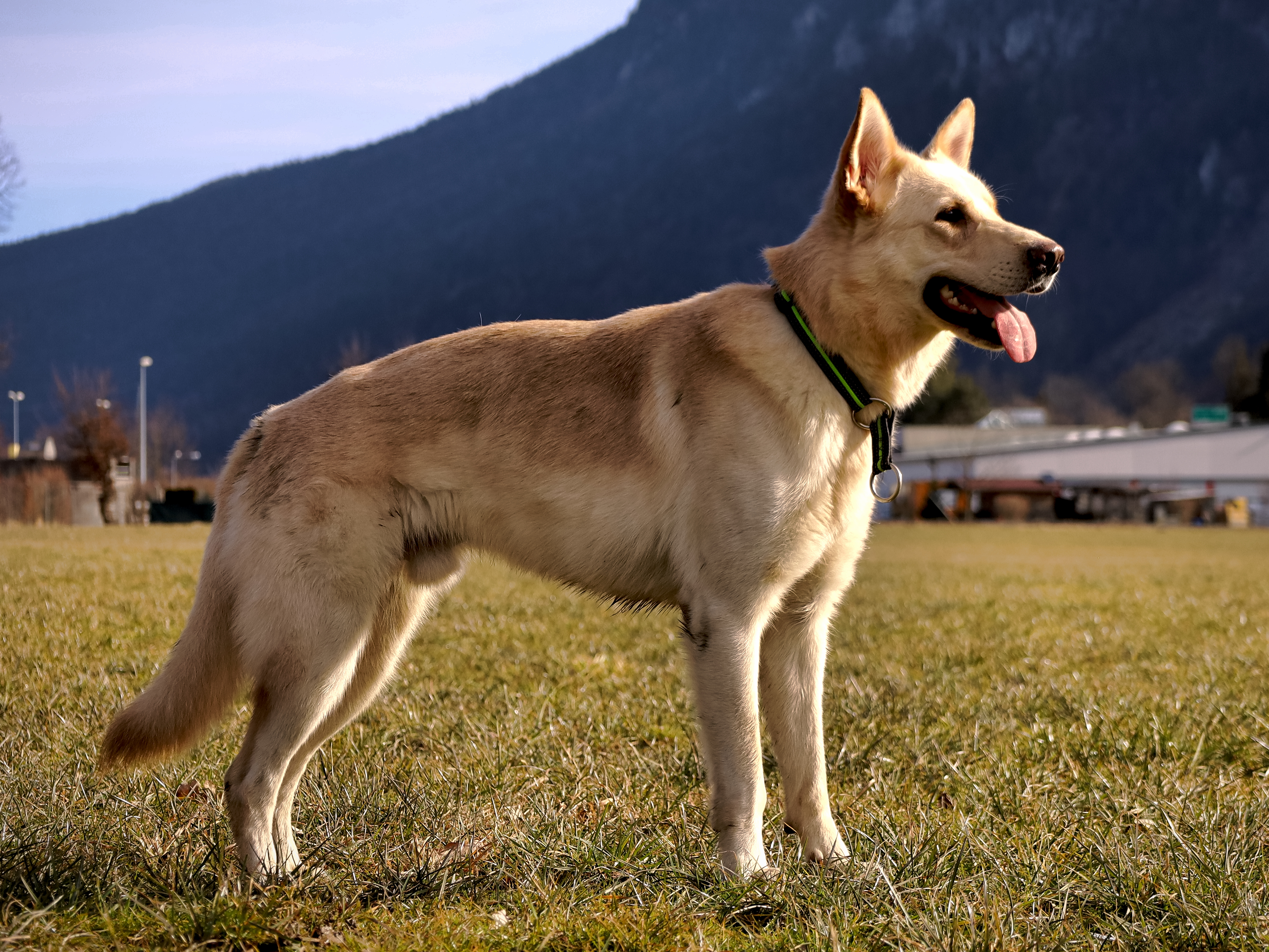
- Other names: Can do gando; Can das vacas; Can da casa; Can lobo; Lobeiro
- Origin: Galicia, Spain
Traits
Height	Males	59–65 cm (23–26 in)
	Females	57–63 cm (22–25 in)
Weight	Males	30–38 kg (66–84 lb)
	Females	25–33 kg (55–73 lb)
- Colour: sand, cinnamon, chestnut-brown, wolf-grey or black
Kennel club standards
- Ministerio de Agricultura, Pesca y Alimentación, Spain: standard
- Xunta de Galicia: standard

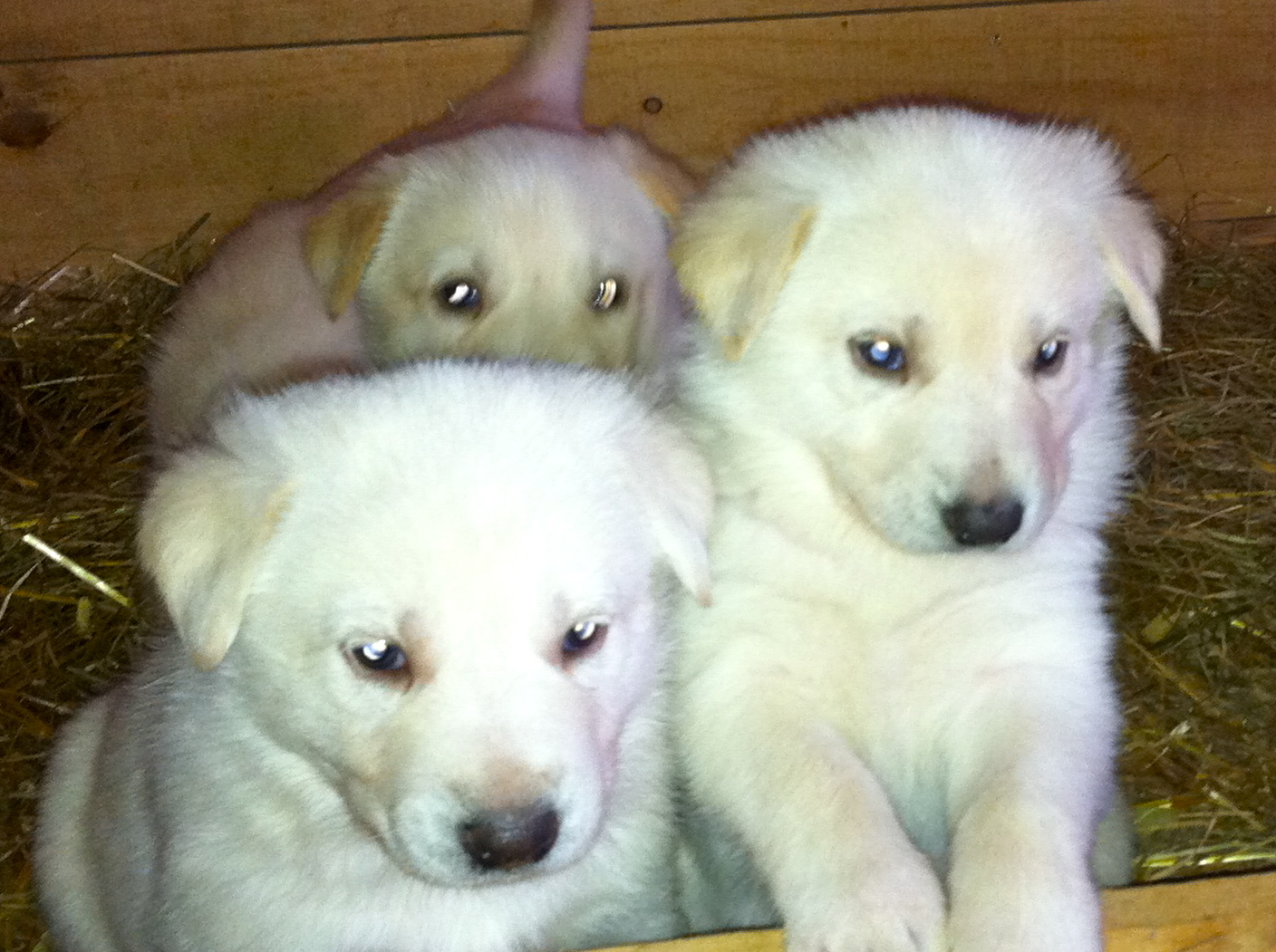
Puppies

The Can de Palleiro is a traditional Spanish breed of shepherd dog from the autonomous community of Galicia in north-western Spain. It was recognised by royal decree in 2001, and the stud-book was established in the same year. It is named after the palleiro (Spanish: pajar), the haystack where it traditionally sleeps.

== History ==
The Can de Palleiro is a traditional shepherd dog breed from the autonomous community of Galicia. It was officially recognised by the Xunta de Galicia in April 2001, and a stud-book was established; it received national recognition by royal decree in May the same year. A breed association, the Club da Raza Can de Palleiro, was formed in 2002.

The breed had come close to extinction in the years before it was officially recognised. In 2009 its conservation status was reported as "in danger of extinction", but numbers were increasing. In 2022 it was listed by the Real Sociedad Canina de España among the breeds in the process of recovery.

It was formerly distributed throughout Galicia. In the twenty-first century it is found principally in Allariz, in A Merca, in Celanova, in O Irixo and in Xinzo de Limia in the Province of Ourense; in Agolada, in Dozón, in Lalín and in Rodeiro in that of Pontevedra; in Os Ancares and elsewhere in Lugo; and in some parts of the Province of A Coruña.

== Characteristics ==
The Can de Palleiro is of medium size: bitches stand some 57 to 63 cm at the withers and weigh between 25 and 33 kg; dogs are on average about 2 cm taller and weigh from 30 and 38 kg. The coat is thick and dense, particularly in the winter months. It may be of any of a wide range of colours, among them sand, cinnamon, chestnut-brown, wolf-grey and black; pied dogs and those with extensive white markings are not eligible for registration in the stud-book.

== Use ==
The dogs were traditionally kept to work both as shepherd dogs and as household guardians. In the twenty-first century some have found use as rescue dogs and in police and related work.
