= Silleda =

- Municipality
- Flag Coat of arms

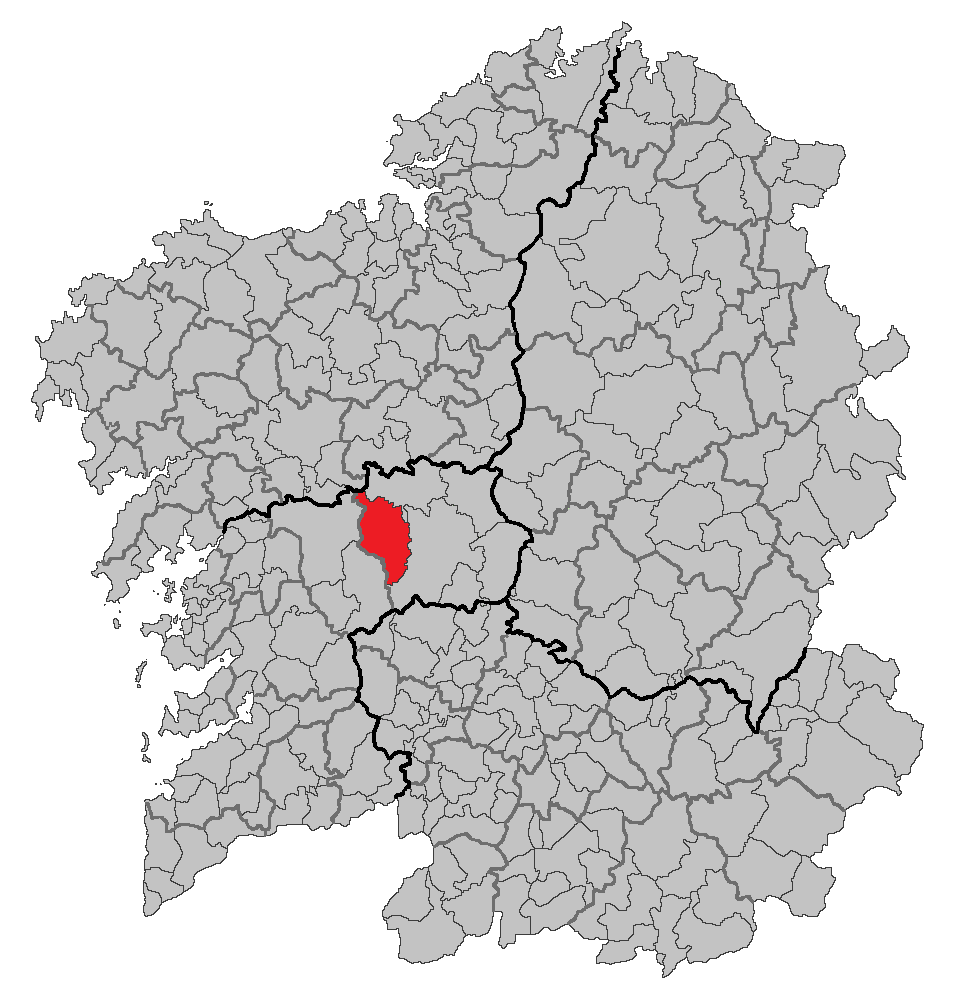
- Location of Silleda within Galicia

- Location in Spain
- Coordinates: 42.7°N 8.233333°W
- Country: Spain
- Autonomous community: Galicia
- Province: Pontevedra
- Comarca: O Deza

Government
  - Type: Mayor–council
  - Body: Concello de Silleda
  - Mayor: Manuel Cuíña Fernández (PSdeG-PSOE)

Area
  - Total: 169 km^{2} (65 sq mi)

Population (2025-01-01)
  - Total: 8,917
  - Density: 52.8/km^{2} (137/sq mi)
- INE
- Time zone: UTC+1 (CET)
  - Summer (DST): UTC+2 (CEST)
- Website: http://www.silleda.es

Silleda is a municipality in the province of Pontevedra, in the autonomous community of Galicia, Spain. It belongs to the comarca of O Deza.

== Access ==
The town is adjacent to the N-525 road that connects Ourense with Santiago de Compostela, and 40 km from the Galician capital, Santiago. It also has access to the AP-53 highway between Santiago de Compostela and Ourense.

== Boundaries ==
The Serra do Candán, the mountains of Chamor, San Sebastián de Meda, and the rivers Ulla and Deza define the limits of the municipality. It borders the municipalities of Vila de Cruces to the north and east, Lalín to the east and south, and A Estrada and Forcarei to the west.

== Administration ==
Its 169 km² is divided into 33 parishes with many different patron saints. They are: Abades (Santa María), Ansemil (San Pedro), Breixa (Santiago), Carboeiro (Santa María), O Castro (San Mamede), Cervaña (San Salvador), Chapa (San Cibrao), Cira (Santa Baia), Cortegada (Santa María), Dornelas (San Martiño), Escuadro (San Salvador), Fiestras (San Martiño), Graba (Santa María), Lamela (San Miguel), Laro (San Salvador), Manduas (San Tirso), Margaride (San Fiz), Martixe (San Cristovo), Moalde (San Mamede), Negreiros (San Martiño), Oleiros (San Miguel), Parada (San Tomé), Pazos (San Martiño), Piñeiro (San Xiao), Ponte (San Miguel), Refoxos (San Paio), Rellas (San Martiño), Saídres (San Xoán), Siador (San Miguel), Silleda (Santa Baia), Taboada (Santiago), Vilar (San Martiño) and Xestoso (Santa María).

== Local economy ==
Silleda is famous for its cattle and agricultural fairs, which receive their largest international attendance during the Semana Verde de Galicia (Green Week of Galicia). The International Fair that takes place at the place created for it, which has Europe's largest roofed street.

It is a town in continuous growth, especially since the creation of the ring road and the industrial estate on the outskirts.

The town has cultural attractions (such as the Romanesque Monastery Carboeiro) and natural ones (for example the Fervenzas do Toxa, one of the tallest waterfalls in Spain).

== Celebrations ==
- Party of the Pie: third Saturday in August
- Doughnut Festival: Easter Sunday
- Party of the Tortilla: Friday of the first week in August
- Ham Festival: second Friday of June
- Chestnut Festival: variable date in November
- Paella Festival:
- Festival Cauldron Beef: variable date in March or April

== See also ==
- List of municipalities in Pontevedra
