= Cirneco dell'Etna =

Italian breed of dog

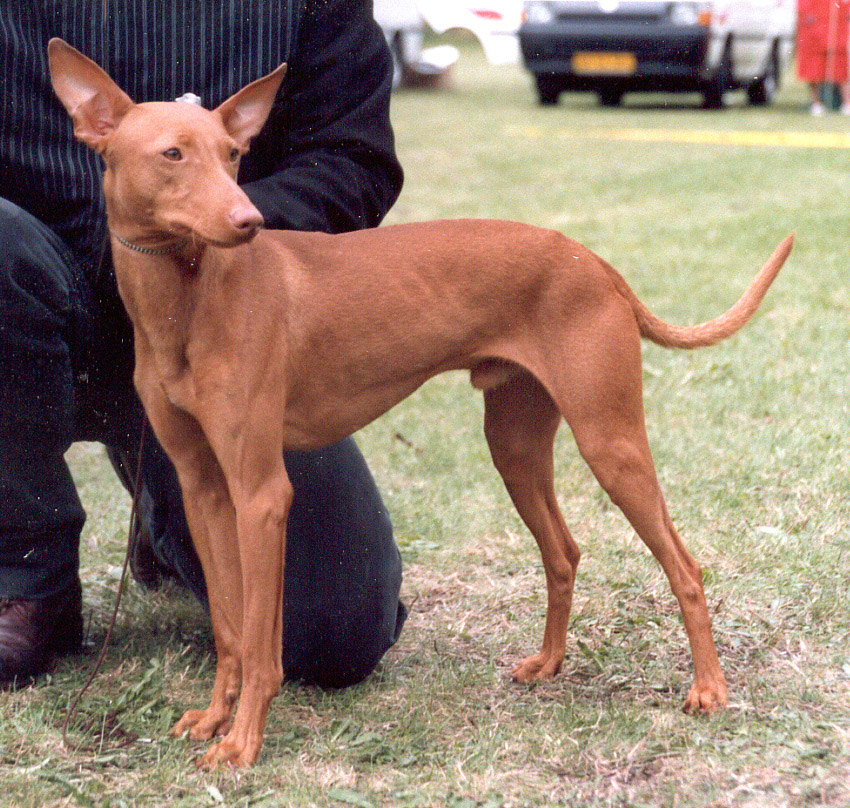
- Origin: Italy
Traits
| Height | Males | 46–50 cm (18–20 in) |
| | Females | 44–48 cm (17–19 in) |
| Weight | Males | 10–13 kg (22–29 lb) |
| | Females | 8–10 kg (18–22 lb) |
- Coat: short on head, short to semi-long on body
- Colour: light sand, isabella, light to dark tan
Kennel club standards
- Ente Nazionale della Cinofilia Italiana: standard
- Fédération Cynologique Internationale: standard

The Cirneco dell'Etna (Note: Italian pronunciation: [tʃirˈneːko delˈlɛtna]; plural Cirnechi [tʃirˈneːki]) (Sicilian: Cirnecu) is an Italian breed of hunting dog from the Mediterranean island of Sicily. It is named for the Etna volcano in eastern Sicily. It has a keen sense of smell, and is used to hunt small game, particularly rabbits. As with many working dogs, registration is conditional on successful completion of a working trial.

== Name ==
The first word of the name, cirneco, derives from the Latin: cyrenaicus, related to Cyrenaica in North Africa, and in modern Italian is used for all the small hunting dogs of the Mediterranean islands, including Sicily, Malta and the Balearic Islands. The second part relates to the area of the Etna volcano in Sicily, where it originated.

== History ==
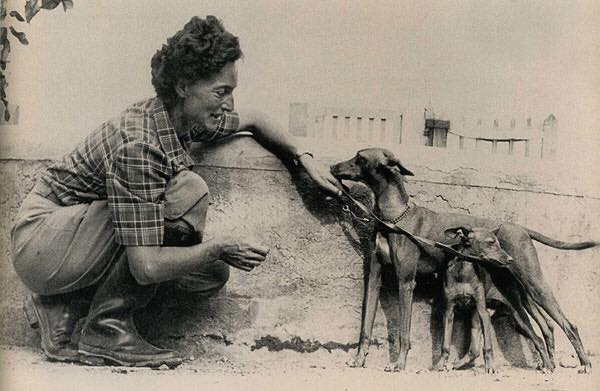
Agata Paternó Castello with two Cirnechi

The Cirneco is a traditional warren hound of Sicily. It is commonly claimed that it is an ancient breed, with origins in Ancient Egypt or Phoenicia; according to the Ente Nazionale della Cinofilia Italiana, coins and inscriptions document its presence in the island from before the time of Christ.

Genetic studies of the relationship of the Cirneco to other breeds have yielded conflicting results: one confirmed the Kelb tal-Fenek of Malta and the Podenco Ibicenco of the Balearic Islands to have the least genetic distance from it, but also linked it to the Pyrenean Mountain Dog; another found evidence of gene flow from the Podenco Canario of the Canary Islands; a genomic study in 2021 found it to be most closely related to the Kelb tal-Fenek, the Segugio Italiano a Pelo Forte and the Segugio Italiano a Pelo Raso.

The earliest written description of the modern breed was by Maurizio Migneco, a veterinary surgeon from Adrano on the slopes of Etna, who published an account in Il Cacciatore Italiano in 1932. This was seen by a Sicilian noblewoman, Agata Paternó Castello, who bought some of the dogs and in 1934 started breeding them. The breed was recognised by the Ente Nazionale della Cinofilia Italiana in 1939, based on a breed standard drawn up by the cynologist Giuseppe Solaro of Turin. The Cirneco was definitively accepted by the Fédération Cynologique Internationale in 1956. It is a rare breed; in the period from 2010 to 2018, new registrations in Italy were between about 100 and 150 per year. Breed registration is conditional on successful completion of a working trial – in this case a specific field trial.
