= Warren hound =

Group of hunting dog breeds

The warren hounds are a group of Mediterranean rabbit-hunting dog breeds. In Spanish, this type of breed is called podenco, in Catalan coniller, and in Portuguese podengo.

Most warren hounds have erect ears, a smooth (or in some cases, wire) coat, a slender body, and a whip-like tail. The Cretan hound usually has rose-ears and a curly or curved tail, while the Barrocal Algarvio is long-haired, and the Podenco Paternino and some Campaneros have a robust, almost mastiff-like body.

Unlike hounds or sighthounds which rely on just one sense, warren hounds tend to work with three senses: smell, sight and hearing.

== Breeds ==
Warren Hound breeds include:

- Barrocal Algarvio (cão do barrocal algarvio), CPC: Initial Registration
- Ca Coniller de Menorca (ca de conills, in Spanish can de conejos de Menorca)
  - Large (grande)
  - Medium (mediano)
  - Small (pequeño)
  - Smooth-haired (corto)
  - Rough-haired (áspero)
- the Ca Rater Mallorquí, also used for rabbit
- Charnaigre (charnigou, charnego, in French charnigue, charnègre) (extinct)
- Cirneco dell'Etna, FCI/AKC
- Cirneco di Bagheria (cirneco della sicilia occidentale)
- Cirneco di Lampedusa (probably extinct)
- Cretan Hound (Κρητικός Λαγωνικός [kritikos lagonikos]), KOE/VDH
- the Guicho of Galicia, Spain
- Ibizan Hound (ca eivissenc, in Spanish podenco ibicenco), FCI/AKC
  - Rough-haired (duro)
  - Smooth-haired (liso)
  - Long-haired (largo) - included to the rough-haired in the FCI standard, described separately in the RSCE standard
- Maneto, RSCE
- Pharaoh Hound (kelb-tal fenek, literally a "rabbit dog"), FCI/AKC
- Podenco Andaluz, RSCE
  - Large (grande)
  - Medium (mediana)
  - Small (chica)
  - Smooth-haired (Corto-type)
  - Wire-haired (Cerdeño-type)
  - Long-haired (Sedeño-type)
- Podenco Canario, FCI
- Podenco Enano del Hierro
- Podenco Orito (podenco orito español), RSCE: Grupos Étnicos
- Podenco Palmero (podenco canario de la laurisilva, podenco del monte de la laurisilva)
- Podenco Paternero (podenco paternino de huelva, podenco de paterna)
- Podengo Crioulo (aracambé, in Portuguese podengo brasileiro, pé duro), Sociedade Brasileira de Cinofilia
  - Large (grande) (not officially accepted by the SOBRACI breed standard)
  - Medium (médio)
  - Small (pequeno, miniatura, terrier de minas)
  - Smooth-haired (curto)
  - Rough-haired (duro)
  - Long-haired (longo)
- Podengo Galego (coalleiro galego, in Spanish podenco gallego), Xunta de Galicia
  - Smooth-haired (corto)
  - Rough-haired (duro) (extinct)
- Portuguese Warren Hound (podengo português), FCI/AKC
  - Large (grande)
  - Medium (médio)
  - Small (pequeno)
  - Smooth-haired (liso, curto)
  - Wire-haired (cerdoso, longo)
- Xarnego Valencià (in Spanish podenco valenciano), RSCE
  - Short-haired (pelo liso)
  - Wire-haired (pelo duro)
  - Long-haired (pelo sedeño)
