= Podenco Canario =

Spanish breed of dog

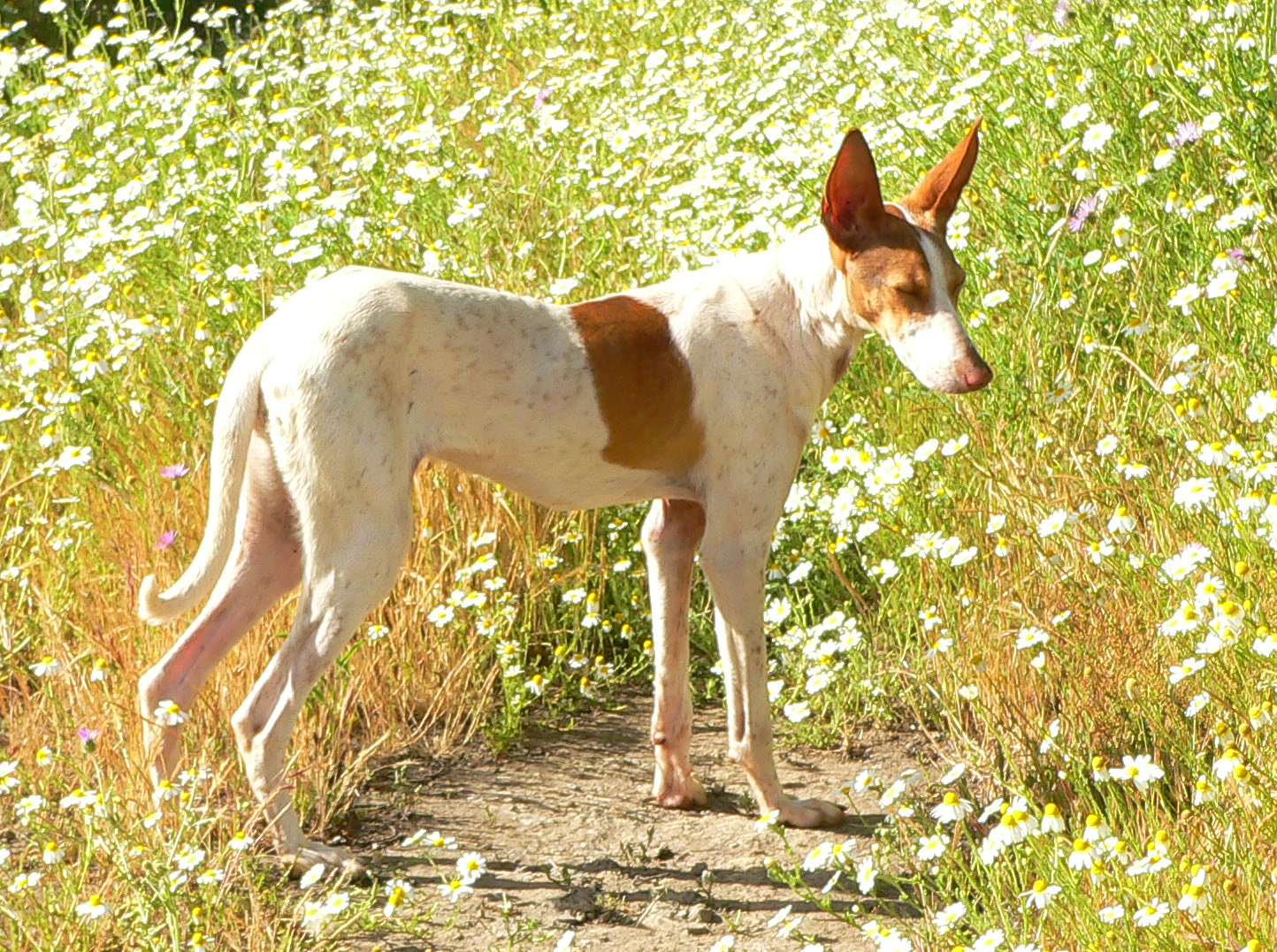
- A bitch

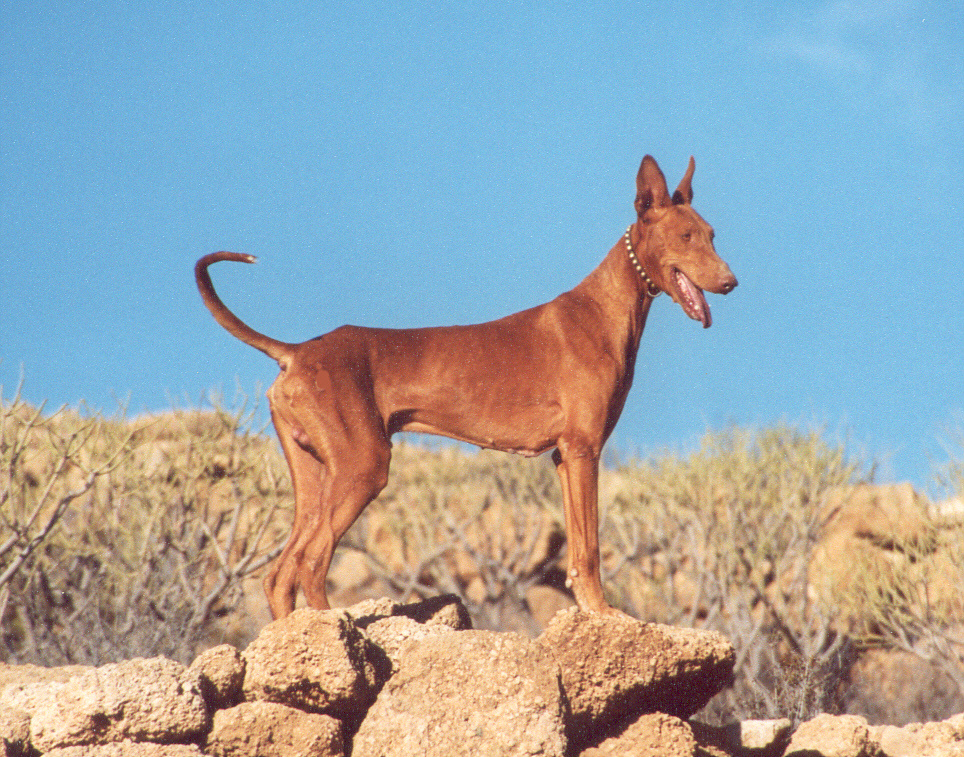
- A dog
- Other names: Canary Islands Warren Hound; Canarian Warren Hound
- Origin: Spain
- Distribution: Canary Islands
Kennel club standards
- Real Sociedad Canina de España: standard
- Fédération Cynologique Internationale: standard

The Podenco Canario is a Spanish breed of warren hound from the Canary Islands. It is used principally for hunting rabbit, but may also be used to hunt other small or larger game.

It is morphologically similar to other warren hounds of Iberia and the Mediterranean region, some of which area also named podenco or podengo; among these are the Podenco Andaluz, the Podenco Ibicenco or Ca Eivissenc, and the Podenco Valenciano.

== History ==
The Podenco Canario is found on all of the Canary Islands. The legend is that it had descended from ancient dogs brought to the islands in antiquity from North Africa by the earliest human settlers and isolated there. However, recent genetics studies have concluded that the Podenco is a type of dog more closely related to, and no more primitive than, the rest of the European hunting breeds.

A study in 2019 of genetic distance between Mediterranean warren hound breeds found three distinct clusters: the four Spanish podenco breeds (Andaluz, Canario, Ibicenco and Valenciano); the Cirneco dell'Etna of Sicily; and the Kelb tal-Fenek of Malta.

It was definitively accepted by the Fédération Cynologique Internationale in 1987, and was recognised in Spanish legislation in 2001; it is also recognised by the La Real Sociedad Canina de España, the national kennel club of Spain.

In 2026 it was among the sixteen Spanish breeds considered by the Real Sociedad Canina de España to be vulnerable.

== Appearance ==
The Podenco Canario is a very agile, slender and lightly built but sturdy dog. There are two distinct sizes of Podenco Canarios. One is similar to the Ibizan Hound, medium in size, with height at the withers approximately 55 to 64 cm (21.7 to 25.2 ins) for males, females are slightly smaller. Sizes vary with the terrain on which the dog hunts. A second smaller size Podenco Canario has been recognised within the Canary Islands, with height at the withers approximately 30 to 40 cm for males, females slightly smaller. The short, dense coat should be some shade of red, white, or a combination of red and white, depending on the island and, in some cases, the specific area on some of the islands. There should be no other colour on the coat, or indeed anywhere on the body, as even the dog's nose, nails and skin should be a shade of red, and they are even known to "blush" when excited. The neck is long, the head is longer than it is wide, and the large ears are carried fully up. The long tail is usually seen low set but can be raised. The tail is not carried too high when moving. The dog should move in an extended and agile trot. Faults, which indicate that a particular dog should not be bred, include aspects of appearance as well as structural faults that would prevent the dog's ability to move and hunt, such as cow hocks, and crossing of the fore and hind legs at a trot.

It is a slightly elongated and very muscular dog with a brown (chocolate), red, or yellow coat, can be accompanied by white, brown, or tan markings, and usually have short fur. They begin to demonstrate hunting instinct in as little as 3 months but can take up to 14 months to develop. When it is pursuing prey, they emit a characteristic staccato repetitive barking, known to some local hunters as "song of the rabbit".

== Health ==
A sexual-development genetic disorder was observed in one dog of this breed, s.p. testicular/ovotesticular disorder, which can result in dogs that are genetically female (XX) developing testes or ovotestes instead of ovaries. This disorder was formerly referred to as SRY-negative XX sex reversal, and is more commonly documented in American and English Cocker Spaniels.
