= Cão do Barrocal Algarvio =

Portuguese breed of dog

- Other names: Barrocal Algarvio
- Origin: Portugal
Traits
Height	Males	52–58 cm
	Females	45–55 cm
Weight	Males	20–25 kg
	Females	15–20 kg
- Coat: thick and smooth, without undercoat
- Colour: most often brown, yellow, grey, black or fawn, either patched, solid, or patched with white; tricoloured and other coats also acceptable
Kennel club standards
- Clube Português de Canicultura: standard

The Cão do Barrocal Algarvio or Barrocal Algarvio is Portuguese breed of warren hound. It originates in the Algarve region of southern Portugal, and is named for the Barrocal sub-region thereof. It was recognised by the Clube Português de Canicultura in 2015 and by the Direção-Geral de Alimentação e Veterinária of Portugal in 2016. It is not recognised by the Fédération Cynologique Internationale. No working trial is required for registration.

== History ==
The Cão do Barrocal Algarvio is a traditional warren hound of the Algarve region in general and of the Barrocal sub-region in particular. It was formerly numerous in that area: in the mid-twentieth century there were some 3500 of the dogs, but numbers fell sharply in the later part of the century and by the 1960s there were fewer than 50 remaining; the population was thought to be at risk of extinction. A breed society, the Associação de Criadores do Cão do Barrocal Algarvio, was formed either in 2004 or in 2006. A molecular genetic study of the dogs was begun in 2012 by the Instituto Nacional de Investigação Veterinária; preliminary results found an index of genetic diversity comparable to that in other Portuguese breeds.

The Barrocal Algarvio was recognised by the Clube Português de Canicultura in 2015, and received official recognition from the Direção-Geral de Alimentação e Veterinária as an autochthonous dog breed originating in Portugal in 2016. It is not recognised by the Fédération Cynologique Internationale.

A single-breed dog show was held in Faro in September 2022, and again in September 2023.

== Characteristics ==
The Cão do Barrocal Algarvio is of medium size, and is roughly square in outline. Height at the withers is in the range 52–58 cm for dogs and about 3 cm less for bitches, with a tolerance of ±2 cm in each case; weights are about 20–25 kg for dogs and some 5 kg less for bitches.

The coat is thick and smooth, with no undercoat. It is most often brown, yellow, grey, black or fawn, either patched, solid, or patched with white; tricoloured and other varied coats also acceptable.

No working trial is required for registration.
