= Cretan Hound =

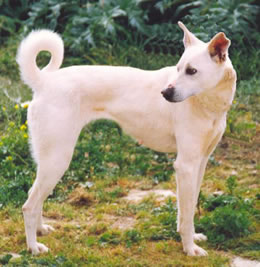
- Other names: Kritikos Lagonikos; Kressa Kyon; Kritikos Ichnilatis
- Origin: Greece
- Distribution: Crete
Traits
Height	Males	52–60 cm (20–24 in)
	Females	50–58 cm (20–23 in)
Weight	Males	16–22 kg (35–49 lb)
	Females	14–20 kg (31–44 lb)
- Coat: short, smooth, hard, flat
- Colour: solid, particolour or tricolour
Kennel club standards
- Kennel Club of Greece: standard

The Kritikos Lagonikos (Cretan Hound) (Greek:Kρητικός Λαγωνικός) is a breed of hunting dog from the Greek island of Crete. The Cretan Hound is recognized both in Greece and in Germany. The breed is also considered to be the oldest European dog breed dating to perhaps before 3200 BCE and Neolithic times.

== History ==
The ancient origins of this rare primitive breed date to a time before written history. According to the Cretan Hound Dog Club, the breed is linked in its DNA and its characteristics to hunting dogs represented in ancient artworks discovered by archaeologists in prehistoric settlements of Crete. The hound's ancestors are clearly depicted on Minoan seal stones, on ceramic and metallic utensils, ornamental objects, in sculptures and on frescos now housed in the Heraklion Archaeological Museum.

== Characteristics ==
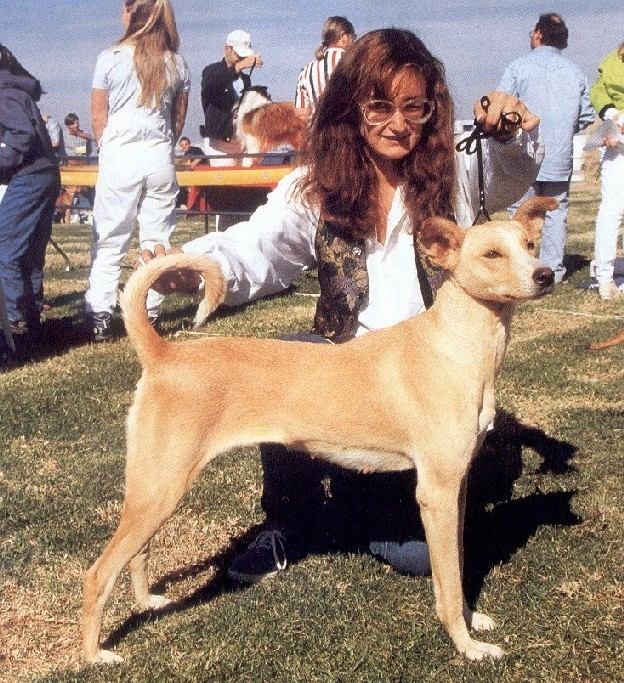
At the Athens International Dog Show in 1997

The Cretan Hound is a slender dog, somewhere between a scenthound and a sighthound in body, particularly light on its feet (that are oval rather than cat-like) and strong in loin, specially adapted for swift reflexes and high speed over dangerous, rocky terrain. The head is wedge-shaped, elongated and dry, with pricked and very mobile ears that fold backwards. The tail is a key breed characteristic, long and curved upwards, forming a loose or tight ring and covered with a brush of longer hair underneath.

The dog is slightly longer than tall, with medium angulations, slender legs and muscle. The loin is slender yet powerful and there is tuck-up, with the points of the hipbones slightly prominent. The breed has a balance between characteristics of speed and stamina, the conformation being a compromise producing great agility.

The breed can range in colour between pure white, cream, sandy, fawn, grey, black or brindle, bi-colored or tri-colored.

Body weights are in the range 14 to 20 kg for bitches and 16 to 22 kg for dogs; heights at the withers are normally between 52 and 56 cm and 54 and 58 cm respectively, with a tolerance of ±2 cm.
