= Escuadro (Zamora, Spain) =

- Location in Spain
- Coordinates: 41°15′33″N 6°00′02″W
- Country: Spain
- Autonomous community: Castile and León
- Province: Zamora
- Municipality: Almeida de Sayago

Population (2014)
  - Total: 26
- Time zone: UTC+1 (CET)
  - Summer (DST): UTC+2 (CEST)

Escuadro is a locality in the municipality of Almeida de Sayago, province of Zamora, Castile and León, Spain. According to the 2014 census (INE) the locality has a population of 26 inhabitants.

== See also ==
- List of municipalities in Zamora
