= Escuadro (Pontevedra, Spain) =

- Rural parish in northwestern Spain
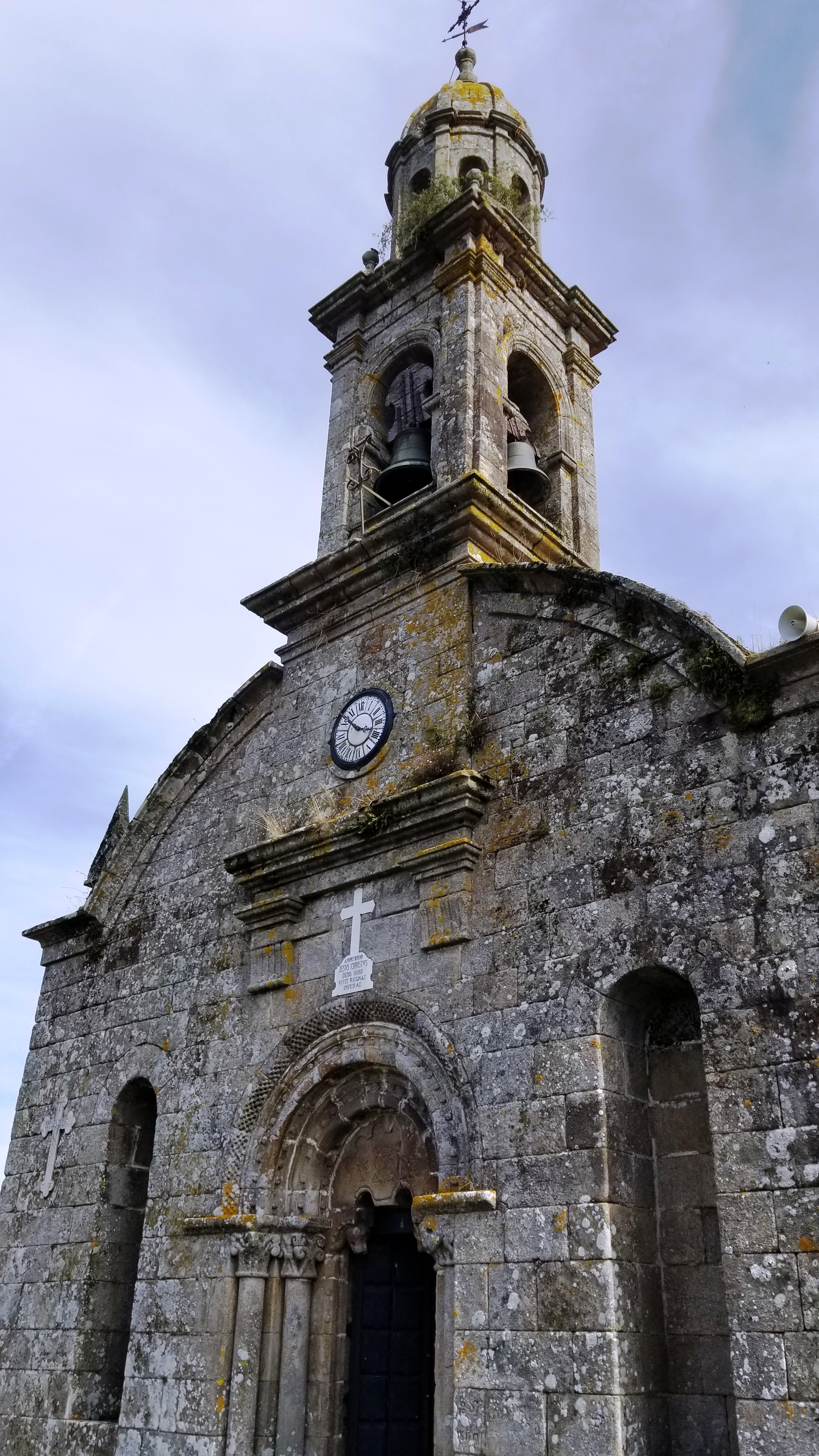
- Details of the facade of the church of San Salvador de Escuadro and campanile.
- Interactive map of Escuadro
- Coordinates: 42°41′23″N 08°17′57″W
- Municipality: Silleda
- Province: Pontevedra
- Country: Spain
- Founded: Before 1096

Population (2021)
  - Total: 380

Escuadro is a rural parish in the Municipality of Silleda in Pontevedra, Spain. Escuadro is one of Silleda's largest and its third most populated parish. In 2021 it had a population of 380 inhabitants. Escuadro, as most rural parishes in Galicia, is losing population to urban centers. The parish relies mostly on its milk and agricultural production. Escuadro is located in the Silver Way of the Camino de Santiago.

== History ==
The oldest references to Escuadro date back to 1096, when Alfonso, Abbot of the Monastery of San Lourenzo de Carboeiro, gave to Raymond of Burgundy, Count of Galicia, and his wife, Urraca of León and Castile, property in the parish. The next mention occurs in 1262, when Martin Petri, priest of the parish, appears as witness in the will of Teresa Yánez, a local resident.

== Patrimony ==
The church of San Salvador de Escuadro is the heart of the parish and is an old Romanesque structure that dates to the 12th century. The church has the original Romanesque façade that includes two pairs of columns that sustain an archivolt. Noteworthy are also the capitals and the campanile tower.

The interior of the church features three magnificent baroque retables. The church was expanded in the 18th century.

The churchyard is used as a graveyard, although, due to it being completely occupied, all burials now are redirected to a newer cemetery not far from the church.

== Photos ==
Front view of the church of San Salvador de Escuadro on a rainy day.	View from the church. On the left an hórreo, a traditional Galician granary can be seen.	Church of San Salvador de Escuadro from the back road.
View of the new Escuadro cemetery.	Interior of the church of Escuadro.	
