= Podenco Valenciano =

Spanish breed of dog

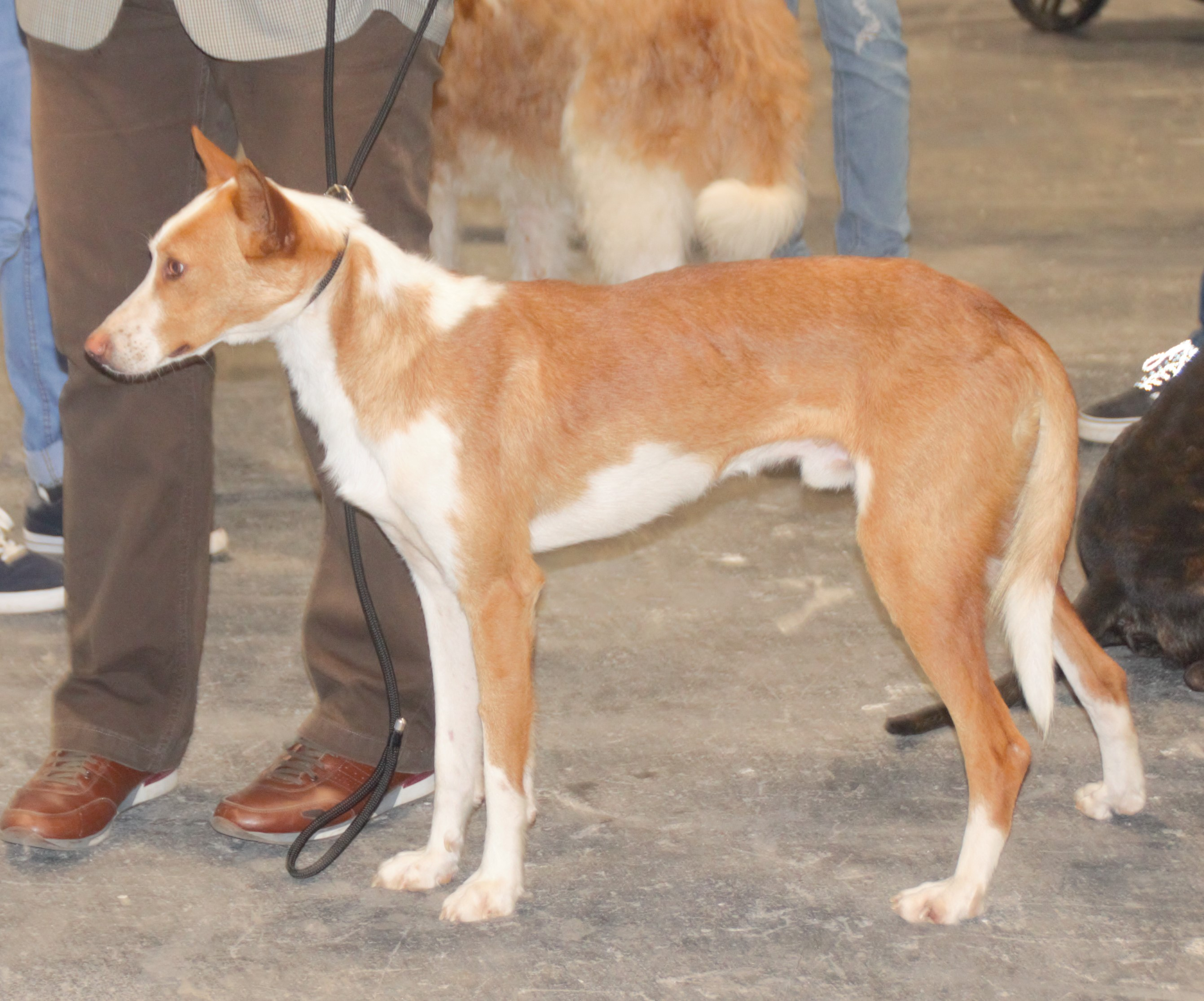
- Smooth-haired dog

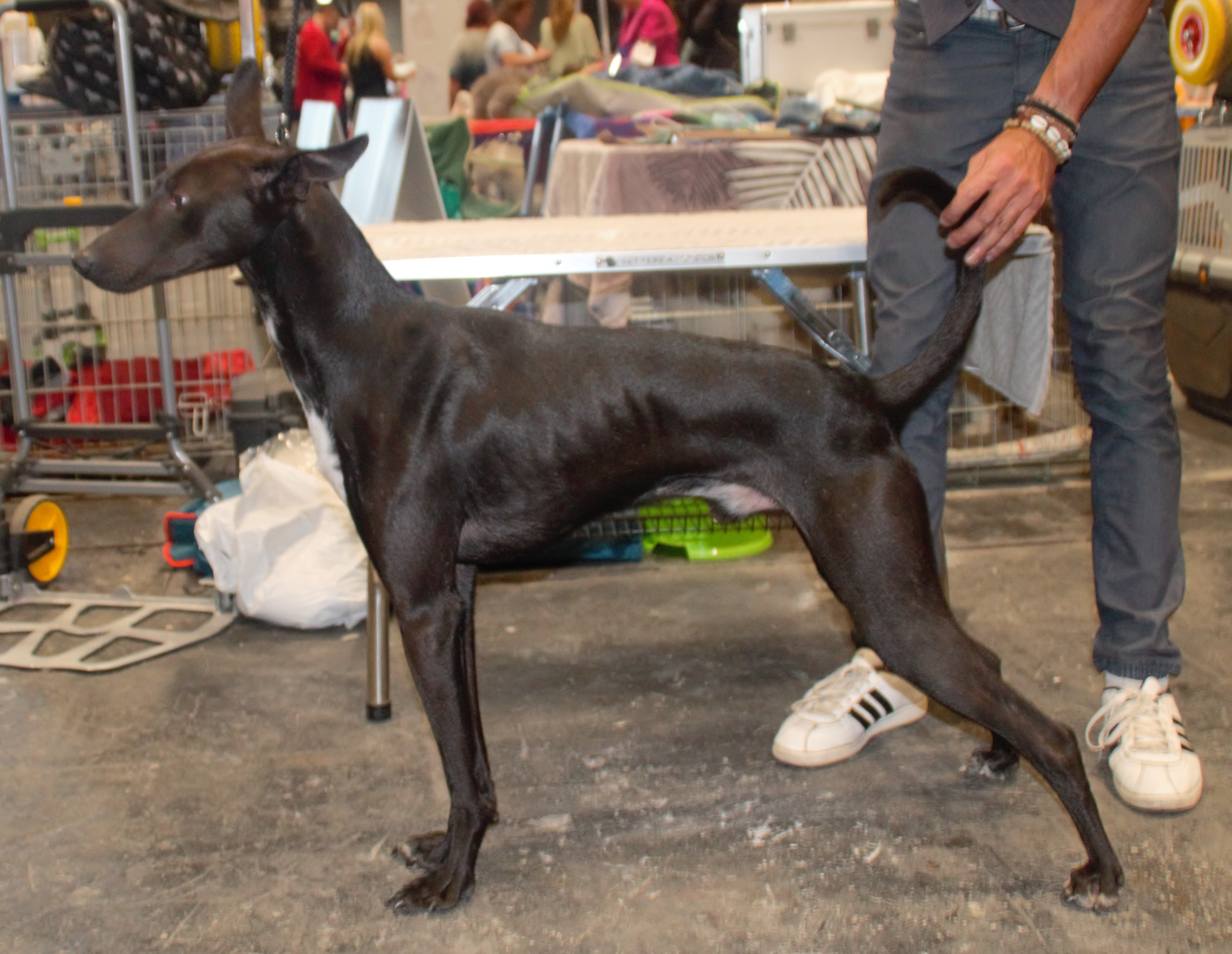
- Smooth-haired dog
- Other names: Xarnego Valenciano; Gos coniller; Xarnego-Podenco Valenciano
- Origin: Spain
- Distribution: Valencian Community
Traits
Height	Males	55 to 61 cm
	Females	50 to 57 cm
Weight	Males	around 20 kg
	Females	around 18 kg
- Coat: three varieties: smooth/straight hair, rough/hard hair and long/silky hair
Kennel club standards
- Real Sociedad Canina de España: standard

The Podenco Valenciano, also known as the Xarnego Valenciano or Gos Coniller, is a Spanish breed of warren hound originating in the Valencian Community of Spain. It was officially recognized by the Real Sociedad Canina de España in 2017.

== History ==
The Podenco Valenciano originated as a dog kept by lower classes, and used for hunting small game, primarily rabbits, during the night. It has historically been found in the autonomous communities of Aragon, Andalusia, Catalonia and Murcia, and in the La Mancha region of Castilla–La Mancha.

In 2009, fanciers of the dog established the Club de Amigos del Xarnego Valenciano to advocate for the breed's official recognition. In 2013, the dog was officially recognized as a native breed of Valencia, and in 2017 by the Real Sociedad Canina de España.

In 2026 it was among the sixteen Spanish breeds considered by the Real Sociedad Canina de España to be vulnerable.

== Description ==
The dog is well adapted to warmer climates. It is a medium dog, muscular, and its coat, which may be silky, smooth, or rough, comes in black, white, or a variety of shades of brown. It does not have an undercoat. Show standards dictate that the dog may not have floppy ears.

== See also ==
- Xarnego, a derogatory word derived from this breed.
