= Vila de Cruces =

- Municipality
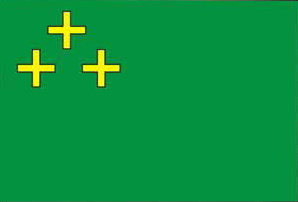
- Flag Coat of arms

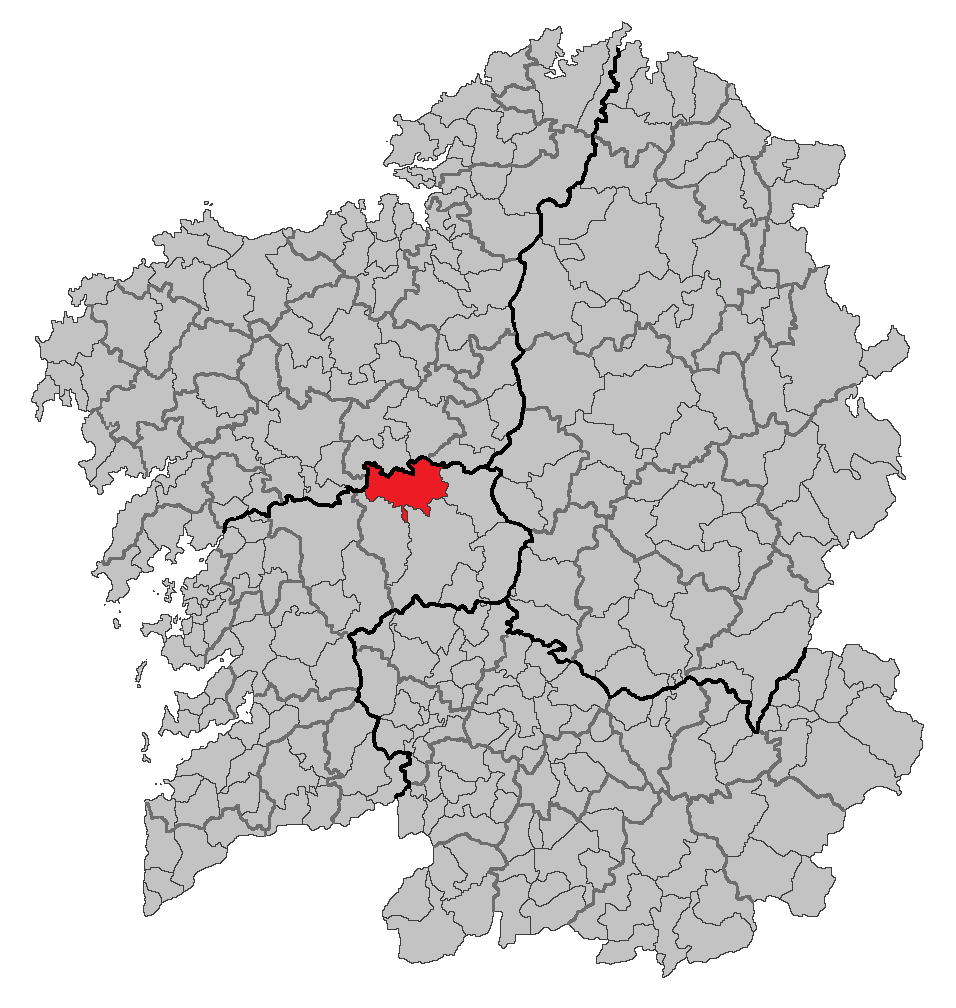
- Situation of Vila de Cruces within Galicia
- Coordinates: 42°46′36″N 8°19′58″W
- Country: Spain
- Region: Galicia
- Province: Pontevedra
- Comarca: O Deza

Area
  - Total: 155 km^{2} (60 sq mi)

Population (2025-01-01)
  - Total: 4,967
  - Density: 32.0/km^{2} (83.0/sq mi)
- Time zone: UTC+1 (CET)
  - Summer (DST): UTC+2 (CET)
- Website: www.viladecruces.es

Vila de Cruces is a municipality in the province of Pontevedra, in the autonomous community of Galicia, Spain. It belongs to the comarca of O Deza.

== History ==
The municipality was in Carbia, a village which belongs to Vila de Cruces, until 1944. On September 19, 1944 the town hall moved to Vila de Cruces, changing the name of the municipality.

== Population ==
In 2012, the population was of 6,085 people. 523 under 15, 3,615 between 15 and 64, and 1,947 older than 65.

== Education ==
All the schools in the municipality are public.

== See also ==
- List of municipalities in Pontevedra
