= Agolada =

- Municipality
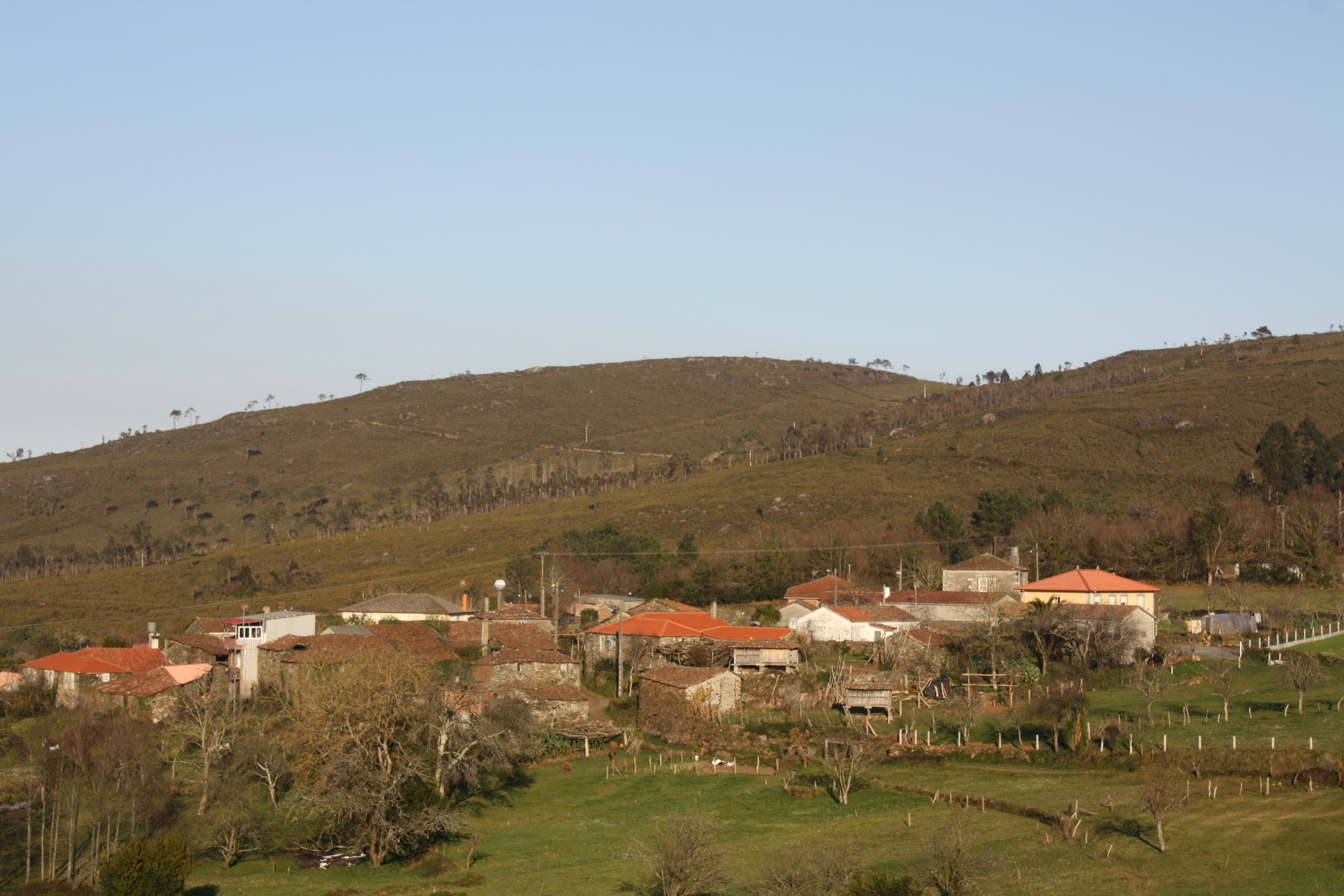
- Town view.

- Coat of arms

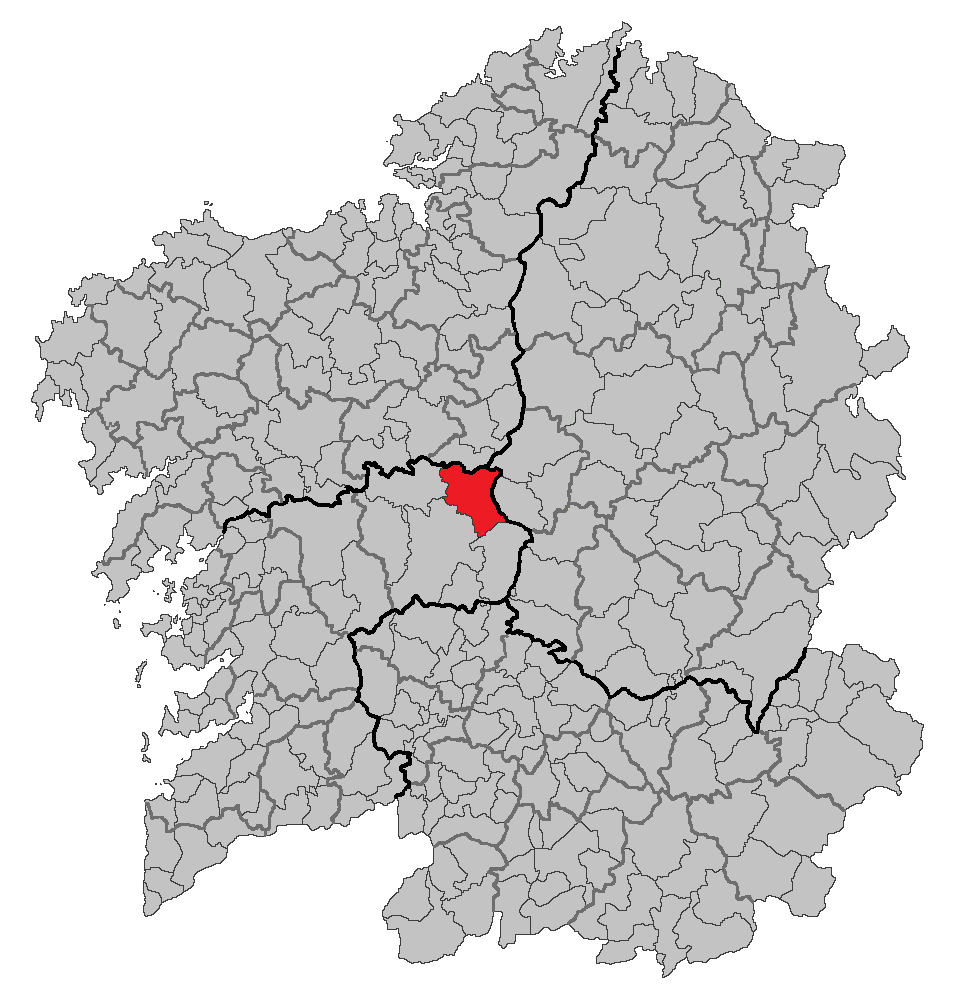
- Location of Agolada within Galicia
- Coordinates: 42°45′44″N 8°1′11″W
- Country: Spain
- Autonomous community: Galicia
- Province: Pontevedra
- Comarca: O Deza
- Parroquias: 24

Government
  - Alcalde (mayor): Luís Calvo Miguélez

Area
  - Total: 147.8 km^{2} (57.1 sq mi)

Population (2025-01-01)
  - Total: 2,225
  - Density: 15.05/km^{2} (38.99/sq mi)
- (INE)
- Time zone: UTC+1 (CET)
  - Summer (DST): UTC+2 (CET)

Agolada is a municipality in the comarca of O Deza, Pontevedra in the autonomous community of Galicia, Spain.to.

== Demography ==
Population

Year	Pop.	±%
1877	5,000	—
1887	5,292	+5.8%
1900	5,490	+3.7%
1910	6,109	+11.3%
1920	6,696	+9.6%
1930	7,002	+4.6%
1940	7,128	+1.8%

Year	Pop.	±%
1950	7,237	+1.5%
1960	6,745	−6.8%
1970	5,340	−20.8%
1980	4,786	−10.4%
1990	5,049	+5.5%
2000	3,882	−23.1%
2010	2,773	−28.6%

Source: From: INE Archiv

== Administration ==
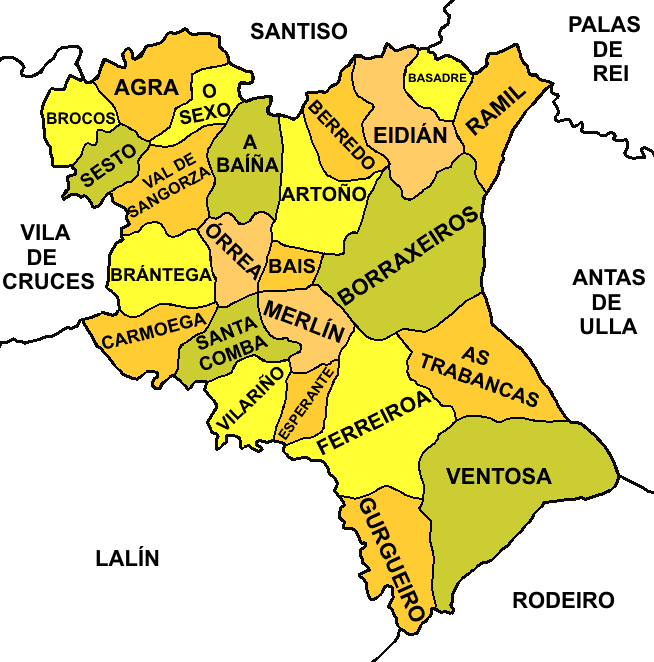
Parròquies of Agolada

It is divided into 24 parroquias (parishes).

== See also ==
- List of municipalities in Pontevedra
