= Rodeiro =

Coordinates: 42°39′00″N 7°57′00″W

- Municipality
- Coat of arms

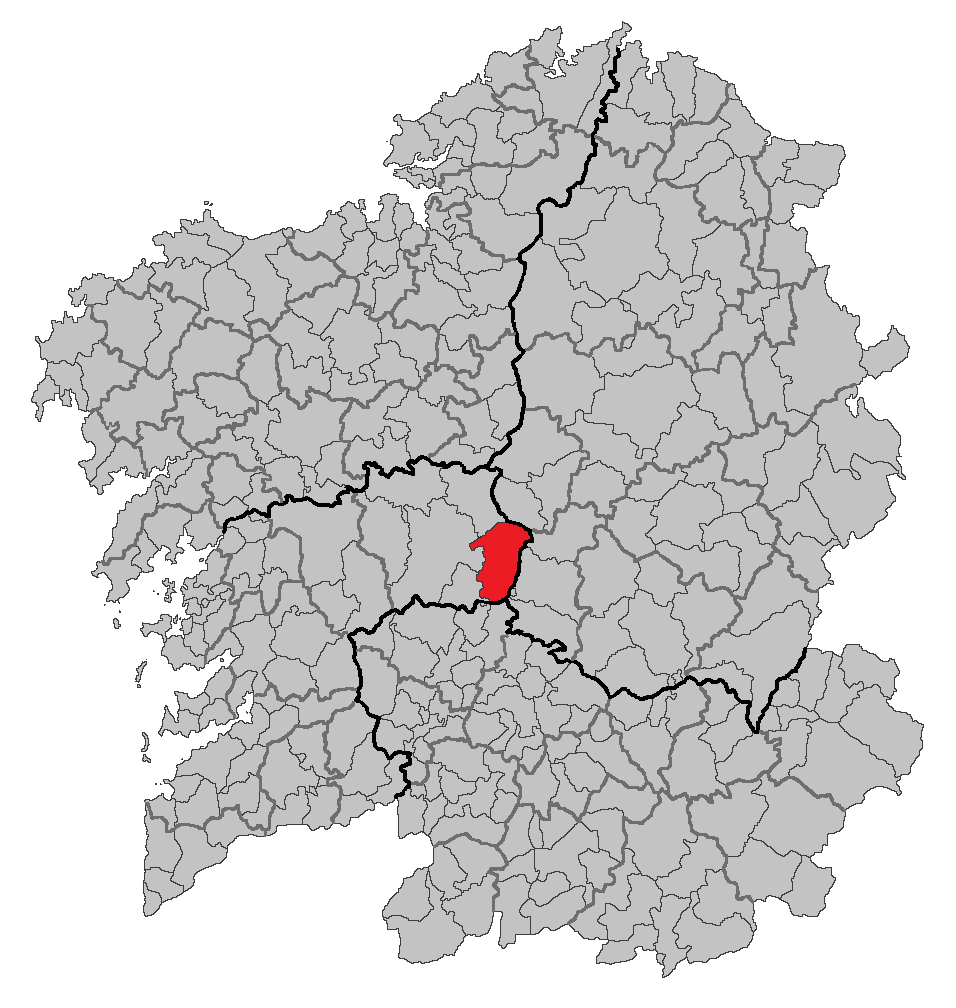
- Situation of Rodeiro within Galicia
- Country: Spain
- Autonomous community: Galicia
- Province: Pontevedra
- Comarca: O Deza

Government
  - Alcalde (Mayor): Luís López Diéguez (PP)

Population (2025-01-01)
  - Total: 2,232
- Time zone: UTC+1 (CET)
  - Summer (DST): UTC+2 (CET)
- Website: http://www.rodeiro.gal/

Rodeiro is a municipality in the province of Pontevedra, in the autonomous community of Galicia, Spain. It belongs to the comarca of O Deza.

== See also ==
- List of municipalities in Pontevedra
