= O Deza =

Coordinates: 42°41′37″N 8°05′24″W

- Comarca
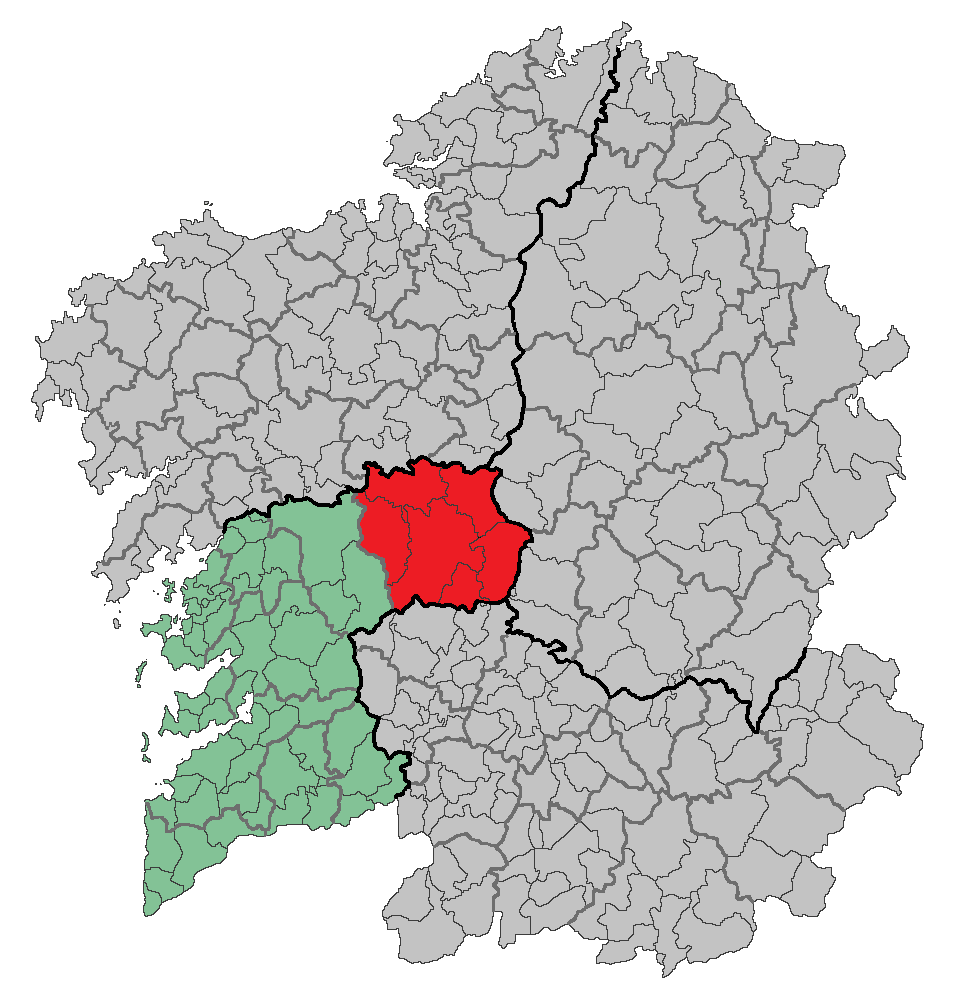
- Country: Spain
- Autonomous community: Galicia
- Province: Pontevedra
- Capital: Lalín
- Municipalities: List: Silleda, Vila de Cruces, Agolada, Rodeiro, Dozón, Lalín

Area
  - Total: 1,024.7 km^{2} (395.6 sq mi)

Population (2018)
  - Total: 40,063
  - Density: 39.097/km^{2} (101.26/sq mi)
- Demonym: dezano
- Time zone: UTC+1 (CET)
  - Summer (DST): UTC+2 (CEST)

O Deza is a comarca in the northeast corner of the Galician Province of Pontevedra. It covers an area of 1,024.7 km^{2}, and had an overall population of 42,511 at the 2011 Census; the latest official estimate (as at the start of 2018) of 40,063.

== Municipalities ==
The camarca is composed of the following 6 municipalities:

Name of municipality	Population (2001)	Population (2011)	Population (2018)
Agolada	3,882	2,773	2,370
Dozón	1,710	1,271	1,110
Lalín	19,869	20,326	20,103
Rodeiro	4,229	2,920	2,509
Silleda	9,089	9,108	8,698
Vila de Cruces	6,928	6,073	5,273
Totals	45,707	42,511	40,063
