= Dozón =

- Municipality
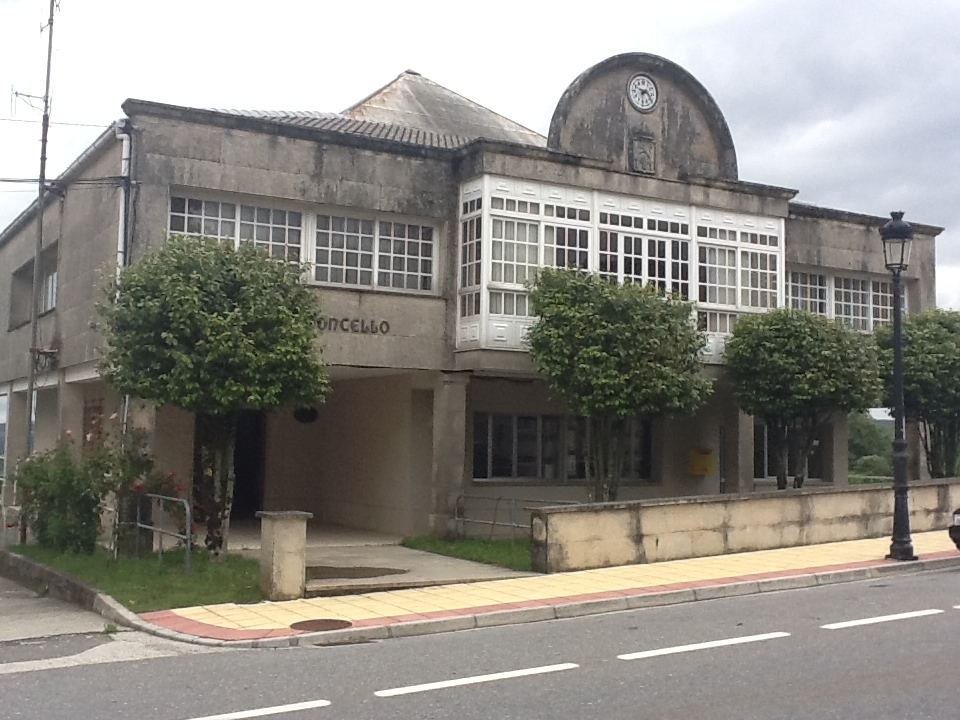
- Town hall.

- Seal

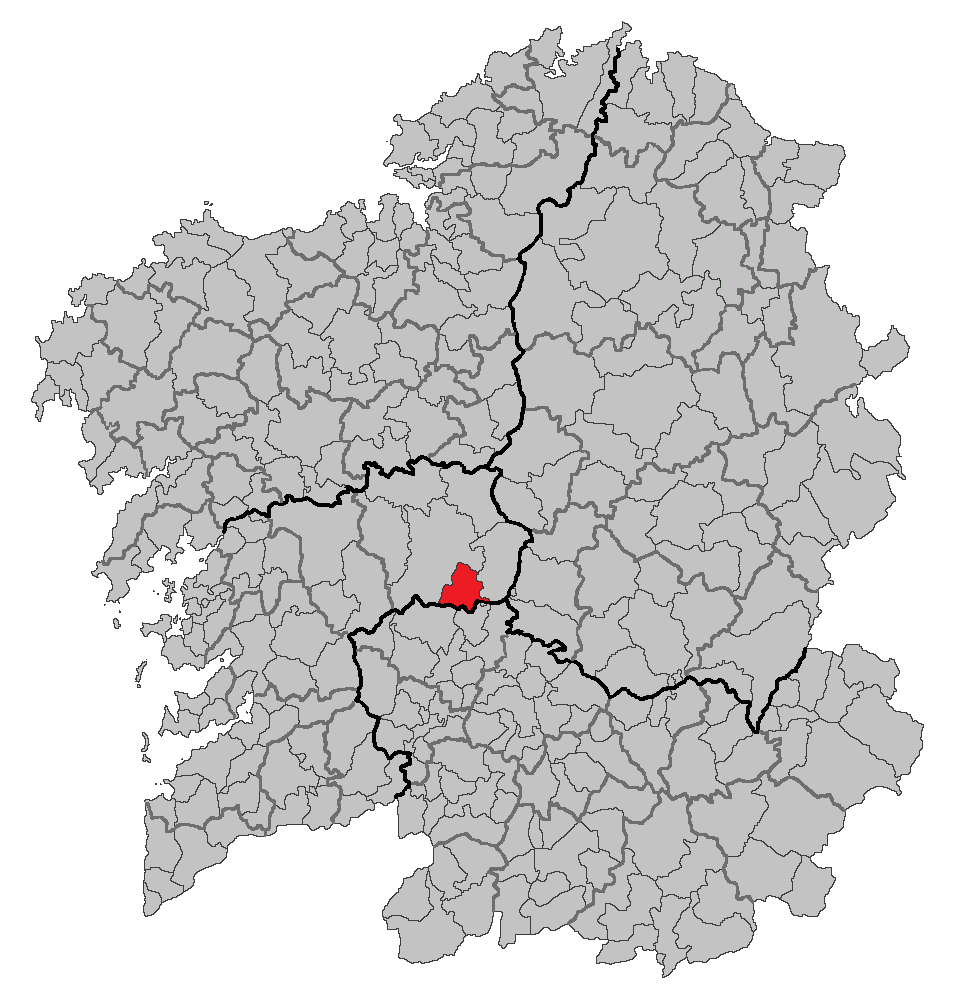
- Location of Dozón within Galicia
- Coordinates: 42°35′4″N 8°1′20″W
- Country: Spain
- Autonomous community: Galicia
- Province: Pontevedra
- Comarca: O Deza

Government
  - Alcalde (Mayor): Adolfo Campos Vázquez (People's Party)

Area
  - Total: 74.23 km^{2} (28.66 sq mi)

Population (2024)
  - Total: 1,017
  - Density: 13.70/km^{2} (35.48/sq mi)
- Time zone: UTC+1 (CET)
  - Summer (DST): UTC+2 (CET)
- Parroquias: Sixto, Sanguiñedo, Dozón, Saa, Bidueiros, La O, Vilarello, Maceiras
- Website: www.dozon.gal/web/es/bienvenida/

Dozón is a municipality in the province of Pontevedra, in the autonomous community of Galicia, Spain. It belongs to the comarca of O Deza.

== See also ==
- List of municipalities in Pontevedra
