= Portuguese Podengo =

Portuguese breed of dog

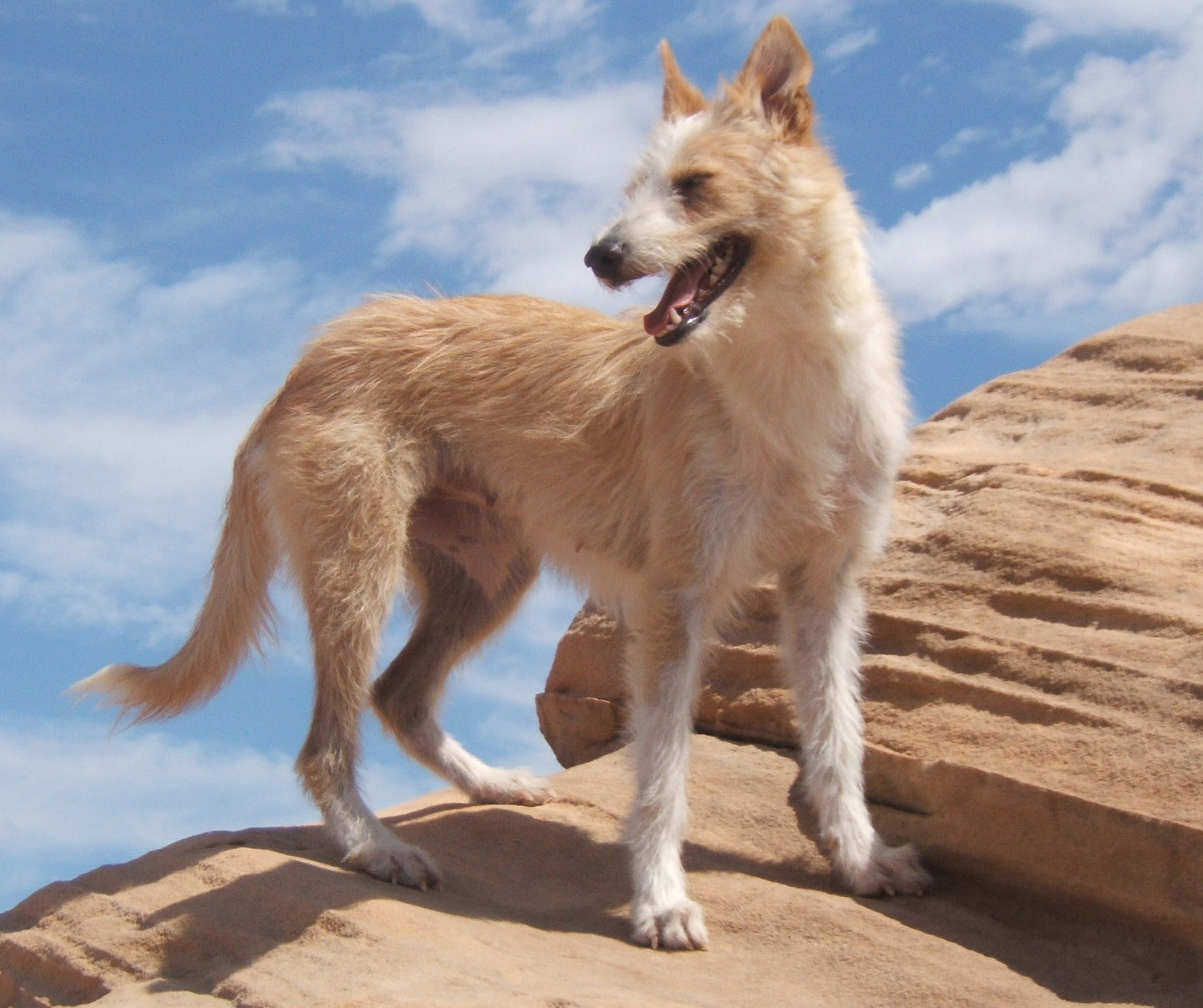
- Medium variety, wire-haired

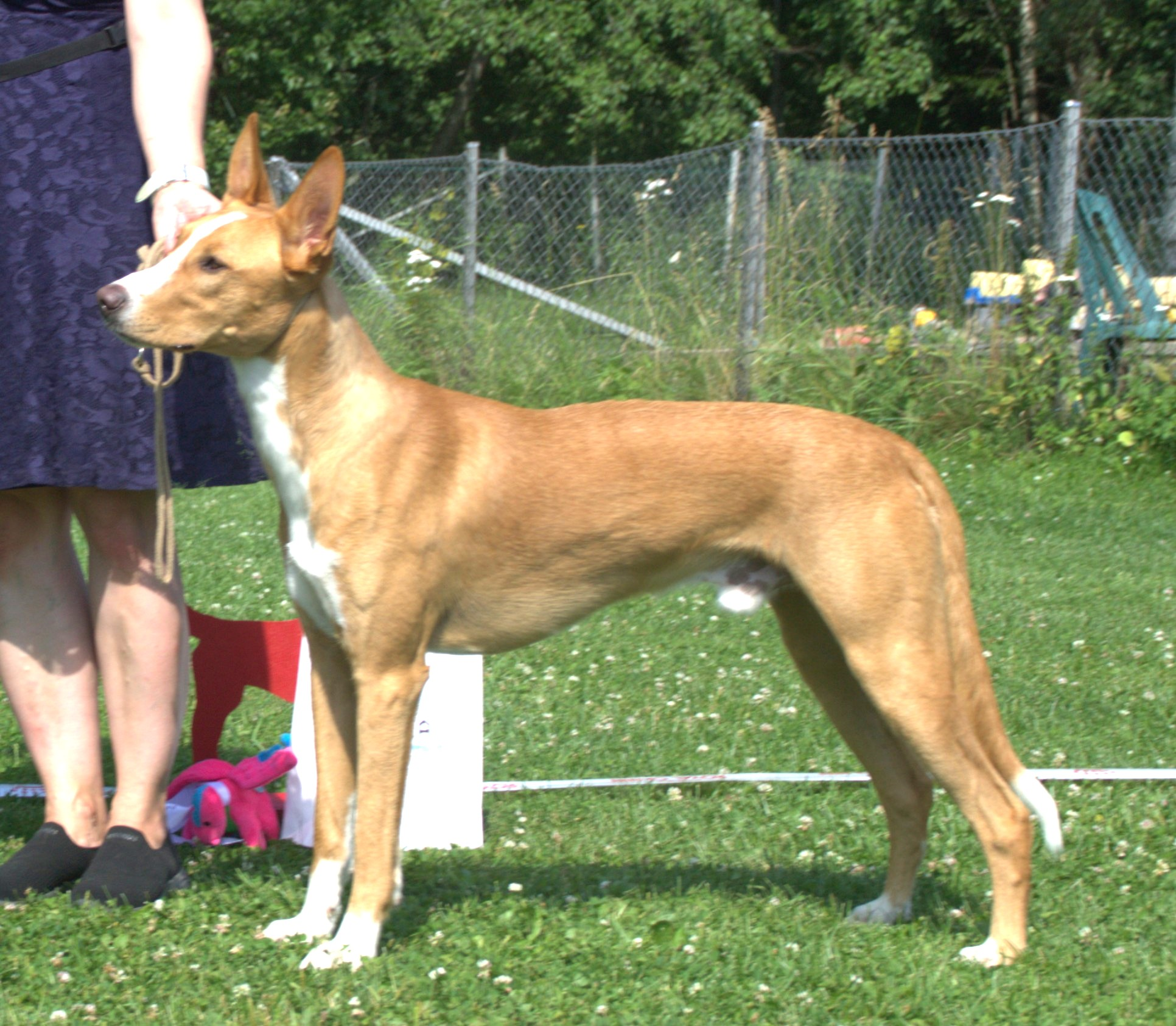
- Large variety, smooth-haired
- Other names: Podengo Português; Portuguese Warren Hound
- Origin: Portugal
- Distribution: Brazil
Traits
- Height: Large: 55–70 cm (22–28 in); Medium: 40–54 cm (16–21 in); Small: 20–30 cm (7.9–11.8 in)
- Weight: Large: 20–30 kg (44–66 lb); Medium: 16–20 kg (35–44 lb); Small: 4–6 kg (8.8–13.2 lb)
Kennel club standards
- Clube Português de Canicultura: standard
- Fédération Cynologique Internationale: standard

The Portuguese Podengo, also known as the Podengo Português or Portuguese Warren Hound, is a Portuguese breed of dog of warren hound type. As a breed, the Podengo is divided into three size categories that are not interbred: small (pequeno), medium (médio) and large (grande). The coat is either short and smooth, or longer and wiry. The smooth-coated variety is traditional, whereas the wire-coated variety results from the assimilation of various other breeds during the twentieth century.

== History ==
In the Middle Ages, hunting dogs in Portugal were collectively known as Podengos de Mostra ('pointers'}. Dogs of this kind were used to kill rats in sea-going Portuguese caravels.

Recognition of the Podengo as a homogeneous breed began in the early twentieth century. The breed standard for the large variety dates from 1953.

== Description ==
The Portuguese Podengo is bred in three size varieties: large, medium and small (Portuguese: grande, medio and pequeno). According to the breed standard, the large stands 55 to 70 cm (22 to 28 in) at the withers and weighs 20 to 30 kg (44 to 66 lb), the medium stands 40 to 54 cm (16 to 21 in) and weighs 16 to 20 kg (35 to 44 lb), and the small stands 20 to 30 cm (8 to 12 in) and weighs 4 to 6 kg (9 to 13 lb).

== Use ==
The Podengo has an affinity for game, regardless of size. The large variety is used mainly for hare, either alone or as a pair; it may also be used to run down deer. The medium and small varieties are usually hunted in packs for rabbit, but may also be used alone.
