= Central Asian Shepherd Dog =

Dog breed

Central Asian Shepherd
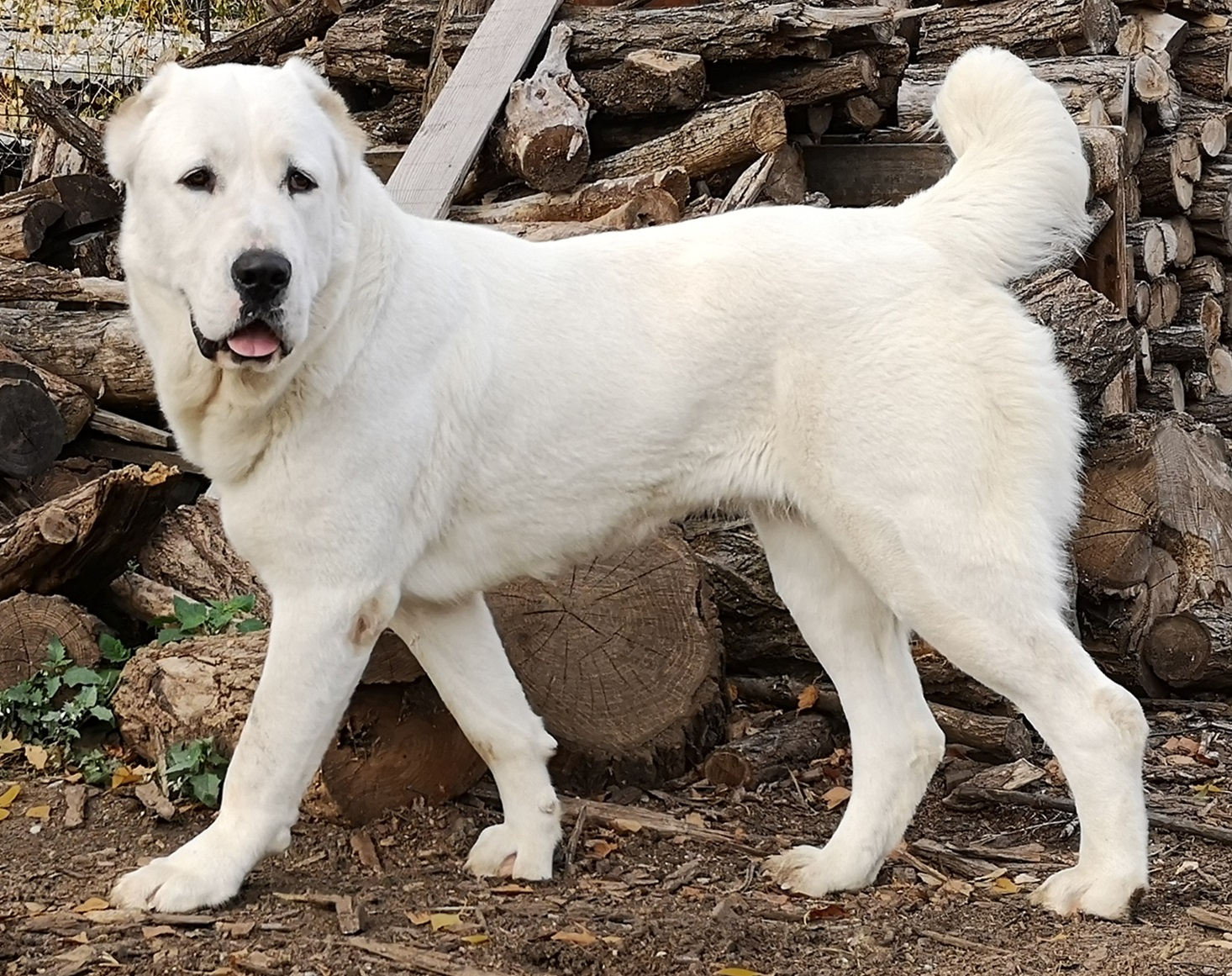
- Central Asian Shepherd
- Other names: Alabai; Boribasar; Tobet; Chuponi; Central Asian Ovcharka; Turkmen Wolfhound
- Origin: Central Asia
Traits
Height	Males	70 cm (28 in) minimum -No max
	Females	65 cm (26 in) minimum -No max
Weight	Males	50 kg (110 lb) minimum -No max
	Females	40 kg (88 lb) minimum -No max
- Coat: Both short and long haired
- Color: White, black, grey, russet, straw, grey/brown, brindle or flecked
- Litter size: 5-7
Kennel club standards
- Fédération Cynologique Internationale: standard

The Central Asian Shepherd Dog, also known as the Alabay, Alabai (Turkmen: Alabaý), Tobet (Kazakh: Төбет, romanized: Töbet), and Turkmen Wolfhound (Russian: туркменский волкодав, romanized: turkmenskiy volkodav), is a livestock guardian dog breed. Traditionally, the breed was used for guarding sheep and goat herds, as well as to protect and for guard duty. In 1990, the State Agroindustrial Committee of Turkmenistan approved the standard of the Turkmen Wolf-Hound dog breed.

== History ==
The ancestor of the Central Asian shepherd originated in a geographical area between the Ural, Caspian Sea, Asia Minor, and the Northwest border of China. Aboriginal Central Asians as well as mixes still can be found in its countries of origin, such as, Kyrgyzstan, Tajikistan, Turkmenistan, Kazakhstan, Afghanistan, Uzbekistan and surrounding countries. It is considered a symbol of pride and national heritage in Turkmenistan, where a gold statue of the animal was unveiled in 2020. Some serve as livestock guardians, some protect their owners, and some are used for dog fighting, which is a national tradition in many countries of that region. This breed bears a strong genetic similarity to other aboriginal breeds of Livestock Guardian dogs from that region such as Georgian Shepherd (Nagazi), Kangal dog, and Akbash.

Russian biologists and scientists have studied the local dog population since the 18th century. After the Communist revolution, the Soviet government focused on working dog breeds for the Red Army, and imported the best breed representatives to Russia as per military dogs' and guard dogs' requirements. Over the decades, this practice harmed the local population. The introduction of new breeds to the region led to crossbreeding. Eventually, purebred dogs only remained with herders, breed enthusiasts and farms, with a surfeit of crosses elsewhere. However, the Central Asian Shepherd Dog population is still stable in general, reproducing some true quality dogs praised for working abilities, regardless of country of origin. Trading bloodlines and purchasing unrelated breeding stock between Russia, other former USSR republics (such as Ukraine, Belarus) and countries where CAO (Central Asian Ovtcharka) still at aboriginal stage is a common practice.

This breed comprises numerous breed types. They differ in size, color, head types, and hair types. Central Asians tend to form a social group, consisting of different members bearing different duties; thus puppies with different working qualities are normally born in the same litter. These breed features, as well as different traditional names for the breed, give grounds for complications with breed standard. Most important, purebred Central Asians have unique breed characteristics. Breed-specific dog anatomy includes exclusive features, such as very noticeable extremely flexible joints, false ribs, specific head set, and very strong neck with massive dewlap. Expressive, almost human eyes, revealing inimitable intelligence, finish the portrait.

For working qualities, modern Central Asians have been bred into different directions, depending on the demand for specific abilities. Traditional dog fighting had always been a national tradition in places of original habitat, but they had never been cruel and destructive as pitbull-type fights. All herders from the same area annually met together, and fought their strongest sheep guardian male dogs to pick the winner. It was about dominance rather than destroying their own kind. Most dogs evaluated each other when met at the field and the weaker or more submissive dog left, taking the loss. Dogs seldom injured each other, inflicting mostly minor scratches within a short period of time. Only leaders had to determine the strongest dog via a fight; but this was minor, compared to their everyday duties, facing predators and venomous snakes.

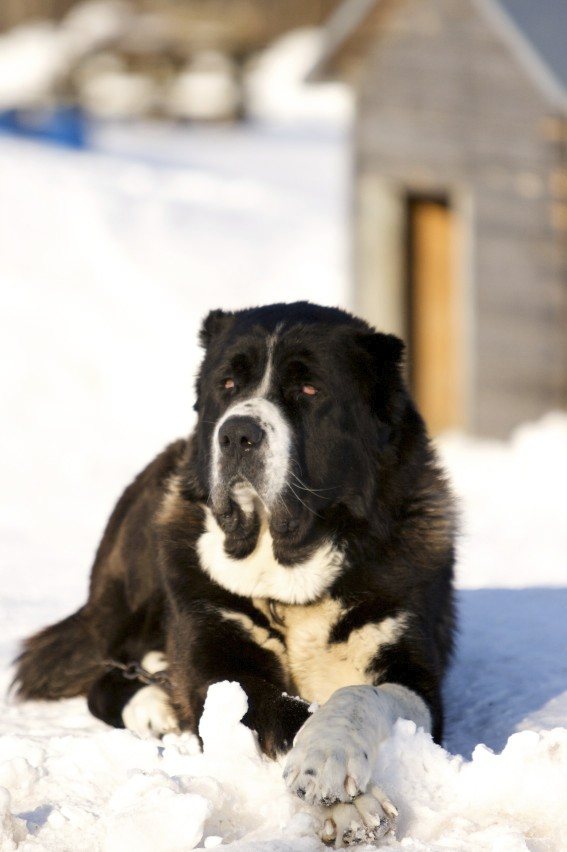
Showing black coat, cropped ears

Modern commercial dog fights often differ from traditional as much as livestock guardian dogs differ from fighting dogs. There are different rules, and different breeds involved. Most Central Asians used for modern commercial fights come from fighting lines. The majority of breeders are aware of their dogs' backgrounds, and will tell whether the dog comes from lines used for fighting. One can always expect a high level of aggression toward other dogs from CAOs with a dog fighting background. It is always important to distinguish whether a dog will display aggression only toward strange, unfriendly dogs entering their territory, while establishing and maintaining the usual social relationships with other animals on the premises; or will attack regardless of whether the other dog is a member of the same social group. Promiscuity in aggression toward strangers and friends is highly atypical for the breed.

Central Asians are still in demand as livestock guardians, though not nearly as much as they used to be. These dogs, to differing degrees, are protective against human intruders; they are territorial, safe with children; they often respect elderly people, protect small animals from predators, and are gentle with family members.

Dogs for personal protection or working dogs originated from livestock guardian dogs, selectively bred by Russian breed experts for working abilities. As a result, they excel in obedience, territory protection, and personal protection, and are very intelligent. As such, they make perfect house dogs. They do not need any complicated training to learn basic house rules, and treat the owner with the same great respect with which their ancestors treated the herder. These dogs were introduced to the worldwide sheep breeding community with great success. Guard dogs must be able to work as a team to protect sheep against predators; thus excessively aggressive CAOs, as with any other dogs, cannot be members of the pack, and will not pass this simple test for compliance with the breed origination purpose.

Central Asian Shepherd dogs can come from working lines, fighting lines, and livestock guardian lines, and behave accordingly, regardless of the country they come from. Simple pedigree research and conversation with the breeder will reveal what basic instincts one can expect from the dog. Central Asians from pure show lines are very rare, because most registries require working tests prior to breeding.

== General appearance ==
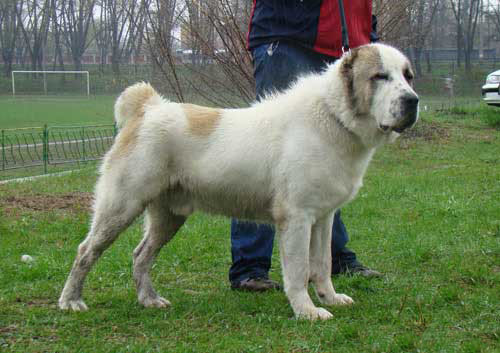
Young male Central Asian Shepherd Dog

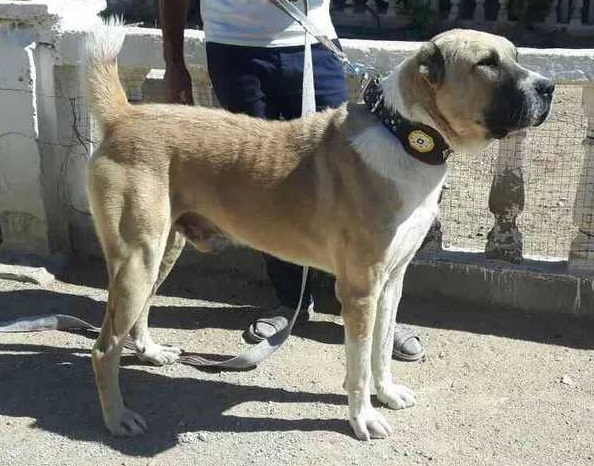
Central Asian Shepherd in Turkmenistan

This breed presents a robust dog of greater than average size with great strength and power. They are independent, curious and alert, yet imperturbable. The dog is as long as it is tall at the withers, or slightly longer than its height. The hair is short or moderately long with a heavy undercoat. Its ears are, in practice, cropped very short, and the tail is docked moderately long (except for dogs from countries where cosmetic surgeries for dogs are illegal). Most common colors are black/white; fawn of different shades, from almost white to deep red; brindle. Some have a black mask.

The head is without pronounced stop or sculls. The neck is low set, short, with dewlap. The body is fairly broad, proportionate, muscles rather flat. The ribcage appears very long because of developed false ribs. The legs are straight, with heavy boning and moderate yet defined angulation. Leg bones must be in proportion, and shall never give the impression that any bone is short. The rump is broad. The typical gait is a gallop; however CAO can trot for hours without wearing themselves out.

The Turkmen President Gurbanguly Berdymukhamedov wrote a book about the animal and in 2017 presented Russian President Vladimir Putin with Verni, a puppy, as a birthday present.

== Popularity ==
In Turkmenistan, the National Holiday of the Turkmen Alabay was established in 2021. In April 2021, the first beauty contest "Brave Turkmen Alabay of the Year" was held in Turkmenistan on the occasion of the National Holiday of the Turkmen Alabay. The contest is held annually in Turkmenistan as part of the Alabay holiday celebrated on the last Sunday of April.

The office of the International Association "Turkmen Alabay" is located in Ashgabat.

To foster the advancement of dog breeding in Turkmenistan and promote international recognition of accomplishments in this field, the "Turkmen Alabay" Association publishes the magazine titled "Türkmeniň nusgalyk alabaýy" ("Exemplary Turkmen Alabay").

== As symbol ==
Alabay dogs were the mascot of the 2017 Asian Indoor and Martial Arts Games.

The image of the Alabay is drawn on the state medals "People's Dog Breeder of Turkmenistan" and "Honored Dog Breeder of Turkmenistan".

In November 2020, a 15-meter Alabay monument was opened in Ashgabat.

== Working requirements and tests ==
The Central Asian is a working breed of dog, and different breed fanciers organizations issue sets or rules and recommendations important to preserve dogs’ abilities to perform certain duties. This includes special tests to determine a dog's inborn qualities, and training degrees or titles aimed to show what the dog can learn to do.

The National Breed Club in Russia developed a temperament test to reveal a dog's willingness and ability to protect the premises, as well as titles in Obedience (such as OKD), and in Protection (such as ZKS or KS) for dogs in most pedigrees from Russia and other countries of that region. There are several other types of tests and training titles, from simple to extremely complicated.

Breed Clubs in European countries seldom have requirements, while common dog sports such as Schutzhund or IPO are not perfectly suitable for a Livestock Guardian dog. Some European Union Countries developed special tests for large breeds of dogs aiming to reveal a dog's overall stability, such as The Dog Mentality Assessment test in Sweden.

Fight tests are common in countries where the breed is still in aboriginal stage, or in the process of formation. Despite adverse reputation of commercial dog fights, fight tests are aimed to reveal a dog's willingness and ability to fight predators. In countries with highly developed open field sheepherding, major livestock herd losses may be caused by predation from feral dogs and wolf-dog hybrids, and the livestock guardian dogs must be able to protect the sheep from those. The fight tests were established to maintain this important breed trait.

== Classification ==
The Central Asian Shepherd is a versatile breed and fits under several different descriptions at a time, which is one reason that different Kennel Clubs classify Central Asians under different dog breed groups. RKF, a FCI-recognized Russian Kennel Club, classifies Central Asians as a working dog breed, reflecting tremendous results in obedience, protection and military-related training. Modern breeding requirements by the leading kennel club in Russia include mandatory temperament tests and training titles, besides show ratings. The UKC fits them together with other Flock Guardians of similar breeds, matching breeds’ natural sheep-guarding abilities, proven by breeders and farmers in the U.S.. The FCI classifies them as Molossoid dogs, sometimes described in different languages as Molossus- or Molosser-type dogs, likewise, reflecting the match by confirmation and common ancestry between the CAO and related breeds.

== Ban ==
The dog is banned in Denmark.

== Gallery ==
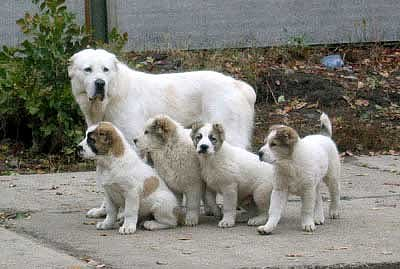
Central Asian Shepherd dog and litter of puppies

== See also ==
- Afghan Shepherd Dog
- Armenian Gampr Dog
- Caucasian Shepherd Dog
- Georgian Shepherd Dog
- List of dog breeds
- Pshdar Dog
- Sarabi Mastiff
