= Kars dog =

Kars Shepherd
- Origin: Turkey
- Distribution: Kars; Ardahan; Artvin; Erzurum; Iğdır
Traits
- Height: average 72.4 cm (28.5 in)
- Weight: average 44.6 kg (98 lb)
- Coat: long haired double coat
- Colour: many colours including black, white, grey, red, yellow and brown; often with white markings
- Notes: registered with the Turkish Standards Institution in 2002

The Kars Shepherd, Turkish: Kars Çoban Köpeği, is a Turkish breed of livestock guardian dog. It is one of three breeds of flock guardian dog in Turkey, the others being the Akbash and the Kangal.

It takes its name from the town of Kars in Kars Province, and is also found throughout the provinces of Ardahan, Artvin, Erzurum and Iğdır in eastern Turkey.

== History ==
The Kars Shepherd is a breed of dog found in the Turkish controlled portion of the Armenian Highlands, and is distributed widely in the provinces of Ağrı, Ardahan, Artvin, Erzurum, Iğdır, Kars and Van. The first scientific description was that of David Nelson, presented at the International Symposium on Turkish Shepherd Dogs in Konya in 1996.

The Kars Shepherd was registered with the Turkish Standards Institution in 2002, but by 2012 had not been registered with the former Ministry of Agriculture and Rural Affairs. The Köpek Irkları ve Kinoloji Federasyonu lists it among the indigenous breeds that it has a duty to protect.

== Characteristics ==
In appearance, the breed closely resembles the Caucasian Shepherd Dog which is native to the Caucasasian countries over Turkey's north-eastern border. It has a long, heavy double coat (short-coated examples are known) that can be found in a number of colors including black, white, grey, red, yellow and brown. They frequently have white markings on their chest, necks and forelegs; slightly smaller than livestock guardian breeds from central and western Turkey such as the Akbash and the Kangal, the Kars has a mean weight of 44.6 kilograms (98 lb) and mean height of 72.4 centimetres (28.5 in).

== Use ==
The Kars is used by local shepherds to protect their flocks from predation; anecdotes exist of several dogs repulsing and even killing bears.
