= Cão de Gado Transmontano =

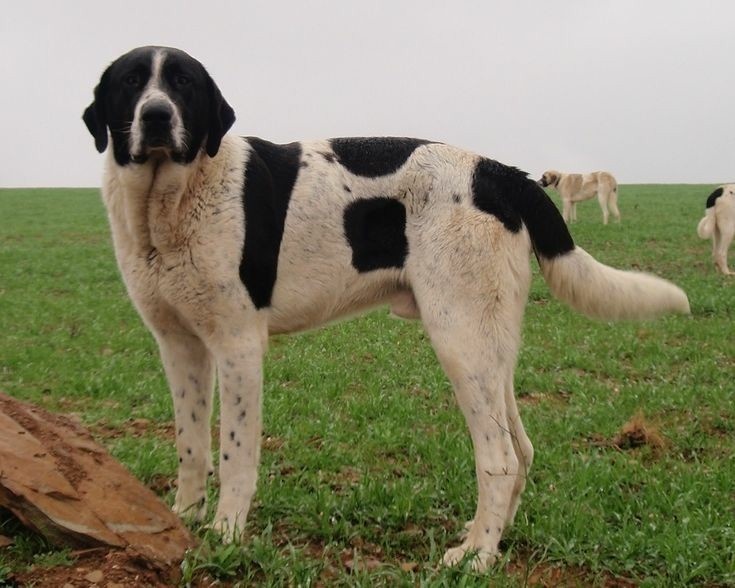
- Other names: Transmontano Mastiff
- Origin: Portugal
Traits
Height	Males	75–85 cm (30–33 in)
	Females	68–78 cm (27–31 in)
Weight	Males	60–75 kg (132–165 lb)
	Females	50–60 kg (110–130 lb)
- Coat: Medium-length double coat
- Colour: White with black, yellow, fawn or wolf grey markings most common
Kennel club standards
- Clube Português de Canicultura: standard
- Fédération Cynologique Internationale: standard

The Cão de Gado Transmontano (Note: Portuguese pronunciation: [ˈkɐ̃w dɨ ˈɣaðu tɾɐ̃ʒmõˈtɐnu]; in isolation, gado is pronounced in Portuguese as [ˈɡaðu]) or Transmontano Mastiff is a breed of livestock guardian dog from Portugal. It originates in the historical province of Trás-os-Montes e Alto Douro in north-eastern Portugal, and is a rare breed confined mostly to this area.

== History ==
The origin of this breed conjoins the history of all the Iberian mastiffs, and its evolution is linked to the transhumance route on the Iberian Peninsula. In ancient times, this molossus dog was found in the high regions of Portugal, in particular in Trás-os-Montes e Alto Douro Province. The breed is used to improve pastoralism by developing it as a livestock guardian dog, particularly against Iberian wolf attacks, that are always prolific in the area. The breed has evolved over time with improved genetics through selective breeding for the conditions of pastoral farming. It is thought by some that the breed is related to the Tibetan Mastiff, but no proof of this exists. It is related to the Rafeiro do Alentejo, the southern Portuguese cattle dog, which "for many centuries" would follow the cattle herd in their migrations within the country. As those migrations were curtailed, the two breeds diverged.

In the mountains of Portugal, which are characterized by steep fields of pastures and difficult road access, this breed has adapted to the conditions of the region (i.e., may be classified as a landrace), and to the types of cattle, sheep, and goats that have traditionally grazed in these areas.

Until the second half of the twentieth century, the region was primarily pastoral. This changed when the government of Portugal encouraged land clearance so that grain could be grown. However, many of those areas have returned to their previous use as pasture.

This breed continues to guard extensive sheep flocks in the region, and more than 95% of the dogs are so employed. As of 1995, the breed was exclusive to Portugal, with no known exports to other countries, and was rarely seen outside of the northern Iberian peninsula. The breed has been imported to the US state of Oregon, as participants in an experiment to document the introduction and effect of "bigger" and "bolder" breeds – than the so-called "white dogs", i.e. the Great Pyrenees, Akbash and Maremma Sheepdog – as a deterrent to predation by wolves. This occurred in large part because of the reintroduction of wolves to northeast Oregon. Since their return in 2008 through 2014, Oregon Department of Fish and Wildlife documented "86 fatal wolf attacks on livestock." (Note: "Those packs are clustered in Northeastern Oregon, where ranchers and sheep producers have been dealing with wolf attacks on livestock.... In the more than 50 years that wolves were gone from Oregon, sheep producers here relied on great Pyrenees, akbash and Maremma sheepdogs, Young said, and often mixes of the sheepdog breeds. "We just call them white dogs because they are usually just big, white dogs," she said. These dogs may weigh 70 to 80 pounds. The breeds Wildlife Services is experimenting with now – Kangal, karakachan and the cão de gado transmontano – are bigger than the white dogs, weighing 100 to 150 pounds. More importantly, Young said, they also may be more bold.") A similar experiment with cattle herds was conducted by the USDA in Montana.

== Description ==
=== Coat and color ===
The breed has a short to medium coat with a dense undercoat, well adapted to the warm dry climate of the region. Generally the coat is white, with large patches of black, yellow, fawn, brindle or 'wolf grey'. It can also be of solid colour of fawn, yellow, wolf grey or brindle.

=== Size ===
This is the largest of the Portuguese breeds.

It is a powerful, muscular and large breed with a broad muzzle and large head. Males range from 75–85 cm (30–33 in), and weigh between 132–165 lb (60–75 kg). Females range from 68–78 cm (27–31 in), weighing in between 110–130 lb (50–60 kg). They have moderately loose-fitting jowls and a single dewlap.

=== Temperament ===
They are first and foremost working livestock guardian dogs, and their development and temperament should be understood and appreciated in that context.

This breed has a calm and reserved reaction to threats, and is notably curious and intelligent. An important attribute is its ability to work as a mixed pack with intact males and females; of course, younger males have to socialize to "temper their dominance" and adapt to working within the pack. They have a natural predisposition toward digging under fences and "expanding their territory," which needs to be monitored and controlled. They are high energy — fit, active, vigorous defenders of the flock, and well adapted to fending off wild boar, foxes, and wolves, which are the prevalent predators in the area. Feral dogs are another opponent. They are an "excellent night guardian."

"This dog is an athlete of all terrain able to make many miles along rugged landscapes, protecting both day and night his herd of possible threats. The largest of these is the Iberian Wolf, an endangered species that with the help of dogs of this breed can be preserved." Representatives were selected and imported to the United States for a United States Department of Agriculture study on use of dogs to mitigate wolf predation in the western United States.

They need large spaces and by nature like to roam free. They are ill-suited to being chained or apartment living. To cope with the heat, they like to burrow and make dens.

They are a good companion dog. Females are generally more tractable and better companion dogs than males.

Like most livestock guardian dogs, they bond with the flock; they are independent thinkers; and they must be trained to respond to their master's voice.

Early training and socialization is essential. (Note: "One thing is for sure, it may even be funny for a dog to show its joy by jumping or nibbling in a joke." But an out-of-control sixty kilogram dog is a hazard and no fun.)

The breed association counsels: "... like all shepherds, the Transmontano Cattle Dog is a dominant dog and a 'single owner' [dog]. And because he is quite jealous and possessive, it is important to emphasize the importance of education and socialization...." They are possessive of toys and food, and owner control is essential. They are highly trainable and responsive to positive dog training techniques. They do not respond well to punishment, and have 'a long memory.' They are high energy dogs that require a lot of space.

In the right environment they are very effective to protect an estate and flock. They are well adapted to protecting flocks (and perhaps herds) from wolves; their use is also seriously being considered for the western United States.

== Breed recognition ==
In 2020, the FCI provisionally recognized the breed. There is also a small breed association, and the government of Portugal maintains a breed registry and facilitates placement of Cão de Gado Transmontano for flock protection from wolves through its agency Parque Natural de Montesinho.

Grupo Lobo (Note: "Grupo Lobo is an independent, non-profit-making NGO (non-governmental organisation) which was founded in 1985 with the aim to conserve the wolf and its ecosystem in Portugal. It has a large number of associates and employees, both in Portugal and abroad.") supports placement of these dogs to protect flocks from wolves; thereby helping to preserve the wolves (a protected species in Portugal) from human conflict. (Note: "In order to contribute to the conservation of the wolf, through the reduction of conflicts with humans due to predation on domestic animals, the Lobo Group outlined in 1987 a line of action that aims to recover the use of the national breeds of cattle dogs for the protection of herds. However, it was only in 1996 that it was possible to start the action when the first support from the Institute for Environmental Promotion (now the Portuguese Environment Agency) was obtained. Since then, and with the support of different public and private entities, it has been possible to continue, on a regular basis, the integration of cattle dogs into herds, as well as monitoring their development and evaluating their effectiveness.")

== See also ==
- List of dog breeds
- Spanish Mastiff, a similar livestock-guardian dog originating in Spain, used successfully in protecting flocks from wolves
