= Kuchi dog =

Afghan Shepherd
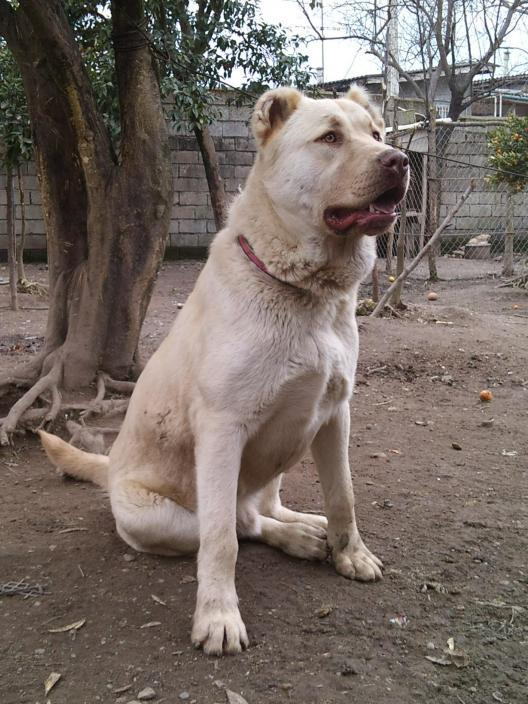
- Afghan Shepherd (Kuchi Dog) in Kabul
- Other names: Sage Kuchi; Sage Jangi; De Kochyano Spai; Jangi Spai; Afghan Shepherd; Powindah dog
- Common nicknames: Kuchi dog Afghan Mastiff
- Origin: Afghanistan

The Kuchi dog (Pashto: د کوچی سپی), also known as the Afghan Shepherd, is an Afghan livestock guardian dog, taking its name from the Kuchi people of Afghanistan. It is a working dog following the nomads, protecting caravans and flocks of sheep, goats, camels and other livestock from wolves, bears, hyenas, big cats and thieves.

The Pashto name is De Kochyano Spai or Jangi Spai, meaning "Dog of the Nomads" and "Fighter Dog". It is found around the central and northern parts of Afghanistan. A livestock guardian dog of Molossoid type, the Kuchi dog shares a similar genetic background to the Alabai (Central Asian Shepherd). They may also be called Powindah dogs, Powindah being synonymous term for Kuchi used in southern Afghanistan.

Because intricately associated with nomad life in remote and rugged regions where Western breeding techniques are not used, it is difficult to identify a "true" Kuchi type dog. Warfare and general unrest in the region have also affected the Kuchi people, many of whom have settled around cities, creating ample opportunity for the Kuchi to interbreed with other dogs. There is no organizing body for dogs in Afghanistan or some Kuchi dogs have been exported to Europe.

== Description ==
The Kuchi dog breed possesses a very rich gene pool and the dogs adapt well to varying environments. It also means that gene expression can vary greatly from one individual to another. For that reason, it is often difficult for an unaccustomed observer to determine what makes a particular dog a true Kuchi dog, or what type of a Kuchi dog it is.

In general, the Kuchi dog is large, often giant dogs, with a coat that can be short, medium, or long, backed by thick underwool. They vary in height, reaching from 23 to 26 inches (58 to 66 cm) at the withers for the females and from 24 to 29 inches (61 to 74 cm) and more for the males. Their weight ranges from about 84 to 120 pounds (38 to 54 kg) for the female dogs and from 88 to 176 pounds (40 to 80 kg) and more for the male dogs. It seems probable that the so-called "dogs of Ghor" should be included among these "Kuchi dogs":

"The dogs of Ghor are mentioned in the earliest descriptions of the province and were always regarded as particularly special mastiffs. According to the Seljuk chronicles of the eleventh century, there was:'A remarkably fine breed of dogs in Ghor so powerful that in frame and strength every one of them is a match for a lion.' The king of the Turquoise Mountain had two Ghor dogs, one named after him and one after the ruler of Ghazni. He would make them fight. It was dangerous to be around him on days when his namesake lost. These dogs formed part of the tribute from the Ghorids to the Seljuk and became such proverbial parts of Islamic culture that a medieval scholar is recorded as saying that 'Avicenna could not fight with a dog from Ghor'.

The shape of the head of a Kuchi dog can vary from a wedge-type head to a brick-type or a bear-type skull, the last one being associated mainly with the dogs of the mountain variety. Their tails are usually docked by about one-third of their length and usually point straight up or at a slight angle. Traditionally, their ears are cropped, almost to the very base.

The Kuchi dogs are tall dogs, with a straight backline, which usually forms a square profile with the front and hind legs. The neck is usually long and thick, with plenty of excess skin hanging from the base of the jaw to the chest. The head is carried horizontally, or at a slight downward angle, with eyes staring straight ahead. The muzzle is dry and muscular.

Their body is often covered with dark spots that do not show through the coat. These spots can also cover the inside of the mouth, the bridge of the nose and the abdomen. The color of the coat comes in many varieties and is of no importance to determine the breed or the type of Kuchi dog. Neither is the length or structure of the hair. Most often, a strip of longer, more wiry hair covers the entire length of the backline, while the neck area is packed with thick and slippery underwool, as well as hair that is slightly longer than over the rest of the body.

The tooth sizes range from small in some females to very large in males, with the fangs often exceeding 1¼". The shape of the fangs can form a hook with a thicker base and the point directed toward the inside of the mouth or can be straighter and tusk-like, much like a wolf's.

There are three main regional types recognized, belonging to one of two body types of dogs – the lion-type and the tiger-type. Those are determined depending on the build and the motor characteristics.

== Subvariants and types ==
The Kuchi dogs can roughly be divided into three types: the mountain-type, the steppe-type, and the desert-type.

- The mountain-type dogs form a very large-boned, heavy-coated variety that is well suited to living in the mountainous regions of the Pamir range. They are usually found at higher elevations, where there are greater humidity and more extreme, cool temperatures.
- The steppe-type dogs are of much lighter build, with medium to long hair. They are faster and more agile on expansive flats than the mountain variety. They can be characterized as having a mastiff-like build combined with a sighthound appearance.
- The desert-type dogs represent a variant most often found in the large desert flatlands, with little vegetation and a hotter climate. They are of medium height, with a short to medium-length coat backed by very thick underwool during the cold season. They can possess characteristics of both of the other types, especially when it comes to the head structure.

Another way to classify the Kuchi dog could be according to a lion-type (Djence Sheri), or a tiger-type (Djence Palangi). This division applies mostly to the desert-type dogs, but it is important to keep in mind that each of the regional variants can display characteristics found in other types as well.

- The lion-type dogs are of heavier build, with larger heads and deeper chests. Their coat is usually thicker and they are of medium height with a larger, bear-type head.
- The tiger-type dogs are the more athletic-looking, with a long and deep habitus, brick- or wedge-shaped head and shorter coat. They are more often linked with steppe-type dogs.

The difference between the two can also be seen in the way they move. The lion-type dogs are more majestic in motion, they appear very proud thanks to keeping their heads raised while they walk.

The tiger-type dogs exhibit more of a sidewinding, catlike motion, with the head usually at the level of the body, and front paws swinging inwards when walking, running, or jumping. Both types are extremely agile and possess tremendous speed and tenacity when running or attacking.

== Temperament ==
Throughout history, the Kuchi people needed their dogs to be vigilant in guarding their livestock, masters and belongings. They trusted their dogs to safeguard their camps and caravans on their seasonal journeys. They also needed their dogs to be tough, not only in the face of danger but also for braving the rough environmental conditions that required an ability to adapt.

The Kuchis travelled from the mountains, through the deserts, in the cold and the searing heat, through a country that, for days, did not offer shelter, food, or even water. They needed dogs that would survive in all kinds of extreme conditions, and still, be able to perform their duties without hindering the progress of the caravan. They often had no spare time or energy left to feed and take care of their dogs. They could not afford to wait for them if they fell ill, or to keep checking to make sure they did not fall behind or runoff.

The Kuchis needed dogs that would be fierce and possess unmatched stamina, courage, and strength, but at the same time would be extremely intelligent, trustworthy and independent. They needed dogs that could function without any special guidance or training.

The resulting breed can be described as representing dogs of character, pride and sense of ownership, social status and territory, and possessing strength and agility, all of which enable them to defend everything that is a part of their turf and extended pack against all predators and intruders.

They can also be extremely friendly and affectionate and tend to form deep emotional bonds with their 'pack members'. However, their independent minds also make them incompatible with the Western lifestyle. They are prone to aggression towards most other dogs, and often humans, who encroach on their territory (this could include postal workers, utility company repairmen, emergency personnel and even friends and family members they have not been acquainted with before) and their territory could extend well beyond the regular house and backyard.

This breed is also very vocal in expressing their emotions. Kuchi dogs often growl to show either pleasure or displeasure, which can be misconstrued by many, especially children, as a sign of aggression - and lead to unwanted and potentially dangerous reactions on their part. This does not mean that the Kuchi breed is entirely unmanageable. But it does mean that to maintain safety and keep Kuchi dogs and their owners in good health and spirits, these dogs demand special attention from their owners, who should be experts on this particular breed and animal behaviour in general.

== History ==
Geographical locale favoured the development of various types of Kuchi dogs. For example, in mountainous regions, the heavier-coated and large-boned dogs were preferred, while in a desert environment a lighter, more agile build was more desirable. Natural selection occurred due to environmental conditions, as well as human preferences. Over the centuries, the breeds that ‘settled’ would become associated with that region and some have even received names and international kennel breed status. The Kangal dog of Turkey, the Caucasian Shepherd Dog in the Caucasus region and many other breeds, such as the large shepherd breeds of Europe, all belong to this group of dogs.

The Central Asian Ovtcharka, or "CAO", is a variant created by Russian breeders desiring to classify a highly varied group of dogs of Central Asia into a ‘breed standard' which would allow the dogs to be graded when judged in competition at popular dog shows. This variant often appears as a large-bodied, heavier-headed, more uniform type; both in colour (often white), coat texture (shorter—less variety) and body type. There is a significant divergence of type from the native Kuchi dogs to the show-winning Srednoaziatska Ovcharka.

The Kuchi dogs have not changed their basic phenotype over time, often appearing diverse in colour, head type, body mass, and coat type. Kuchi dogs work with their owners to fulfill duties. Otherwise, they may exhibit behaviors that can be problematic for owners and society. They are a primitive breed with natural guarding instincts, functioning as working lines rather than show dogs.

== See also ==
- Kuchi people
- Afghan Hound
