= Rize Koyun =

Turkish breed of dog

Rize Koyan
- Origin: Turkey
- Breed status: Not recognised as a breed by any major kennel club.
Traits
Height	Males	Approximately 70 cm (28 in)
	Females	Approximately 68 cm (27 in)
- Colour: Various colours with grey most common, bi-coloured dogs known

The Rize Koyan is a breed of livestock guardian dog from north Black Sea shore in Turkey.

The Rize Koyan is named after the town of Rize, the breed is found throughout Rize and Ordu provinces in the north-east Black Sea region of Turkey. The breed resembles the Kars, with a solid body and strong legs. Their structure allows the dogs to navigate the Canik Mountains, where these dogs are typically found. When the dog alerts by adopting a posture where the tail raises with a curve and the dog stands high with confidence. Dogs stand approximately 70 cm (28 in), bitches a centimetre or two less. The coat can be various colours, although dark grey is most common; bi-coloured examples are known. This dog is typically not a pet, but a working animal for the household to aid in vocal or physical warning of possible danger that may occur. These dogs were bred to protect their owners and the properties.
