= Kurdish Mastiff =

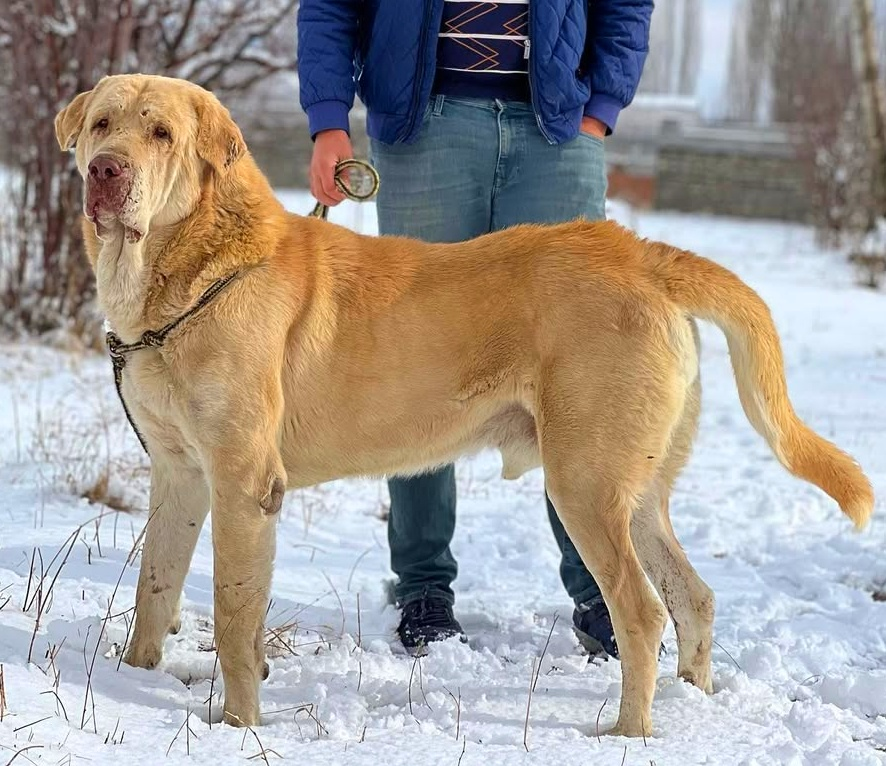
- Kurdish mastiff
- Common nicknames: Pshdar dog
- Origin: Kurdistan Region of Iraq

The Kurdish Mastiff, Assyrian Shepherd, or Pişder dog (Kurdish: سەگی پشدەری, romanized: Segî Pişderî) is a dog landrace native to the mountainous Kurdistan Region in Iraq, especially the Pişder region in Sulaymaniyah Governorate. This dog is often used as a livestock guardian against predators and number around a few thousand heads. They have been compared to the Kangal Dog and the Akbash.

== Description ==
The weight of the adult dogs increases with age and can reach 80 kg. The average is at 73.50 kg reaching from 67 kg in Sangasar to 80 kg in Qira Diza. The average body length is about 75 cm with the back length of aged dogs reaching over 88 cm.

== History ==
In 1892, John Paul Dudley published a medical treatise on dogs and mentioned the Kurdish Mastiff:

In Kurdistan in northern Asia Minor, and that region of Asia, there is a dog much resembling the English Mastiff, which is the constant companion and friend of the Kurd — a shepherd and watch dog partaking much of the character of his half - barbarous master, and will not well bear a change of country and associations. Nothing owned by the Kurd is valued more highly than this fierce and powerful animal, which is to a great extent treated as sacred, at least so far as the hand of a stranger is concerned. In color the Kurdish Mastiff is mainly tawny; has tail long, and head large, and his body is tall, ponderous, and well proportioned".
