= Kuvasz =

Hungarian breed of dog

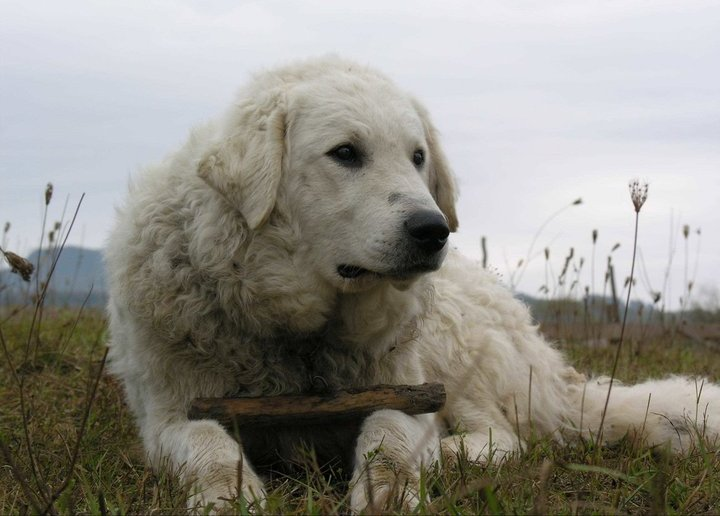
- Other names: Hungarian Kuvasz
- Origin: Hungary
Traits
Height	Males	71–76 cm (28–30 in)
	Females	66–70 cm (26–28 in)
Weight	Males	48–62 kg (106–137 lb)
	Females	37–50 kg (82–110 lb)
- Coat: coarse and wavy, with soft undercoat
- Colour: white
Kennel club standards
- Fédération Cynologique Internationale: standard

The Kuvasz (Note: pronounced [ˈkuvɒs], plural Kuvaszok.) is a Hungarian breed of flock guardian dog. Mention of the breed can be found in old Hungarian texts. They have historically been royal guard dogs, or guarded livestock, but have been increasingly found in homes as pets over the last seventy years. The American Kennel Club includes the breed in the working dog group.

== History ==
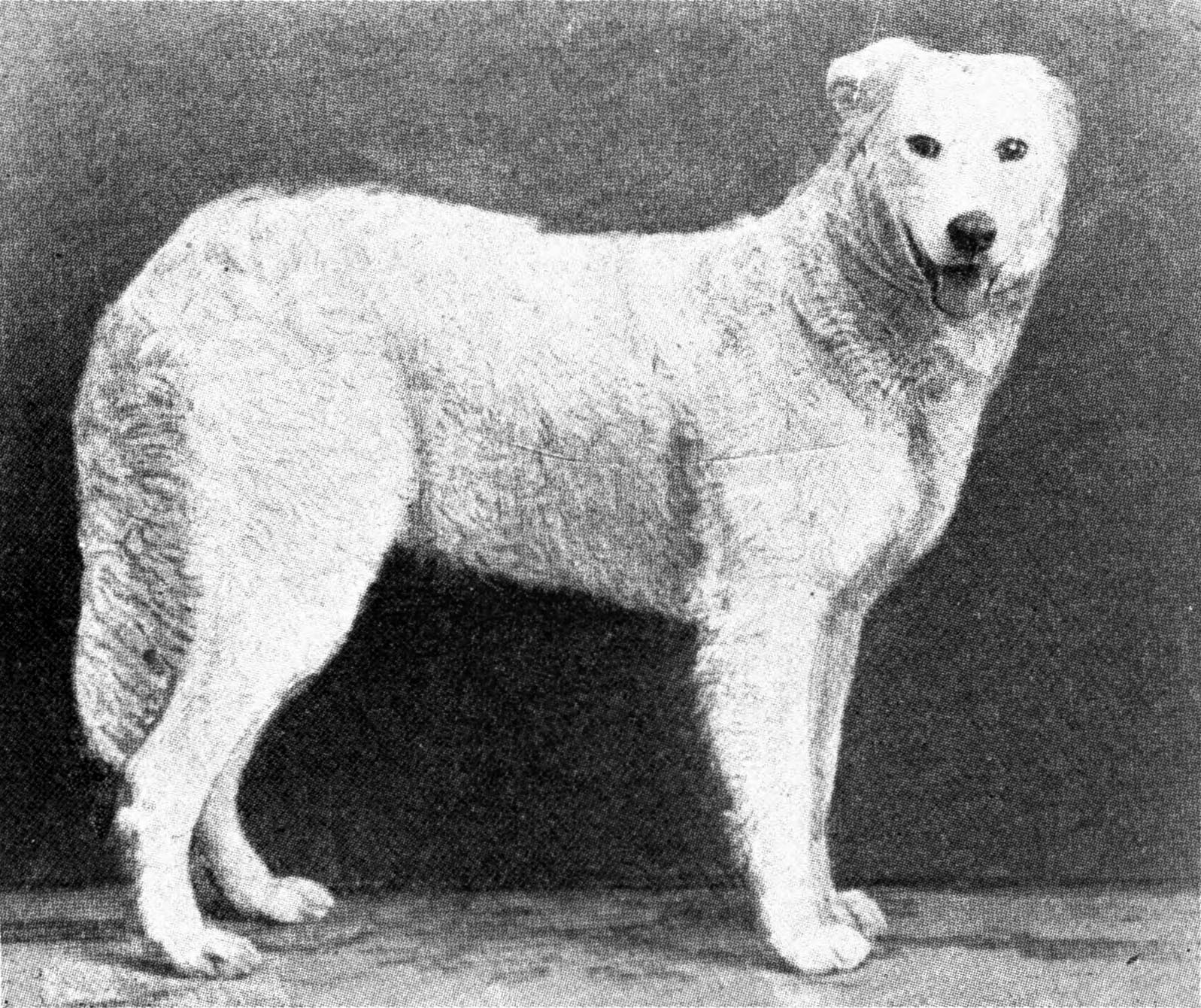
At the Panama–Pacific International Exposition in San Francisco in 1915

Found in Western Anatolia, the Akbash dog breed is related to the Kuvasz, a Hungarian dog breed originating in Hungary. Known as a Pecheneg buffalo fighter, the Kuvasz originated in the Carpathian Basin and has since become renowned among Hungarian dogs worldwide. Its name likely derives from the Old Turkish word "Küvaz." Some associate this dog breed with the Cuman-Kipchaks. It is also thought that it may have been a breed introduced to Hungary during the Migration Period.

In the fifteenth century Matthias Corvinus is believed to have kept large numbers of Kuvasz dogs at his court as guard dogs or hunting dogs, or sometimes as war dogs.

Selective breeding of the Kuvasz as a breed began in the latter part of the nineteenth century, and a breed standard was drawn up. In 1934 it was accepted by the Fédération Cynologique Internationale, which lists the date of full acceptance as 1954.

By the end of World War II, nearly all the Kuvasz dogs in Hungary had been killed. The dogs had such a reputation for protecting their families that they were actively sought and killed by German and Soviet soldiers, while at the same time some German officers used to take Kuvasz dogs home with them. After the Soviet invasion and the end of the war, the breed was nearly extinct in Hungary. After the war, it was revealed that fewer than thirty Kuvasz were left in Hungary and some sources indicate the number may have been as few as twelve. Since then, due to many dedicated breeders, Kuvasz breed have repopulated Hungary. However, as a result of this near extinction, the genetic pool available to breeders was severely restricted and there is conjecture that some may have used other breeds, such as the Great Pyrenees, to continue their programs.

In Romania, a breed-specific legislation specifies that Kuvasz must be muzzled when in public places.

== Characteristics ==
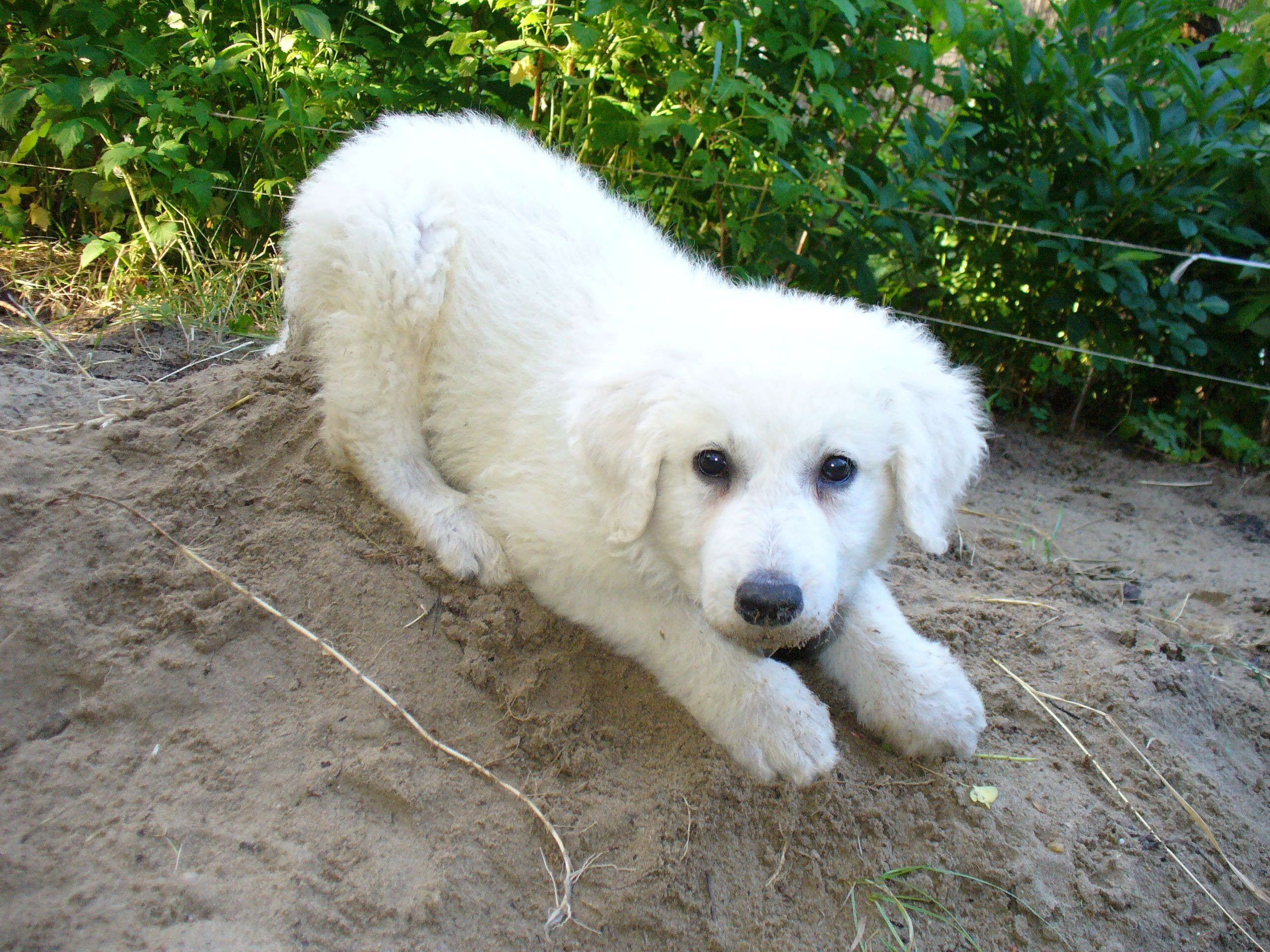
A puppy

The Kuvasz is a large and powerful dog: dogs stand some 71–76 cm at the withers, with weights in the range 48–62 kg; bitches may stand 66–70 cm and weigh 37–50 kg.

The coat is white or ivory-white; it is thick and coarse, with a soft undercoat. The skin is slate-grey; the tip of the nose, the lips and the rims of the eyes are black, and the pads of the paws are black or slate-grey.

The head is wedge-shaped; the muzzle is slightly less than half the full length of the head, and the stop is slight. The eyes are almond-shaped, dark brown, and slightly slanted.

Although generally a healthy and robust breed which can be expected to live approximately 12–14 years, the Kuvasz is prone to developmental bone problems.

== See also ==
- Hungarian dog breeds
- List of dog breeds
