= Bankhar dog =

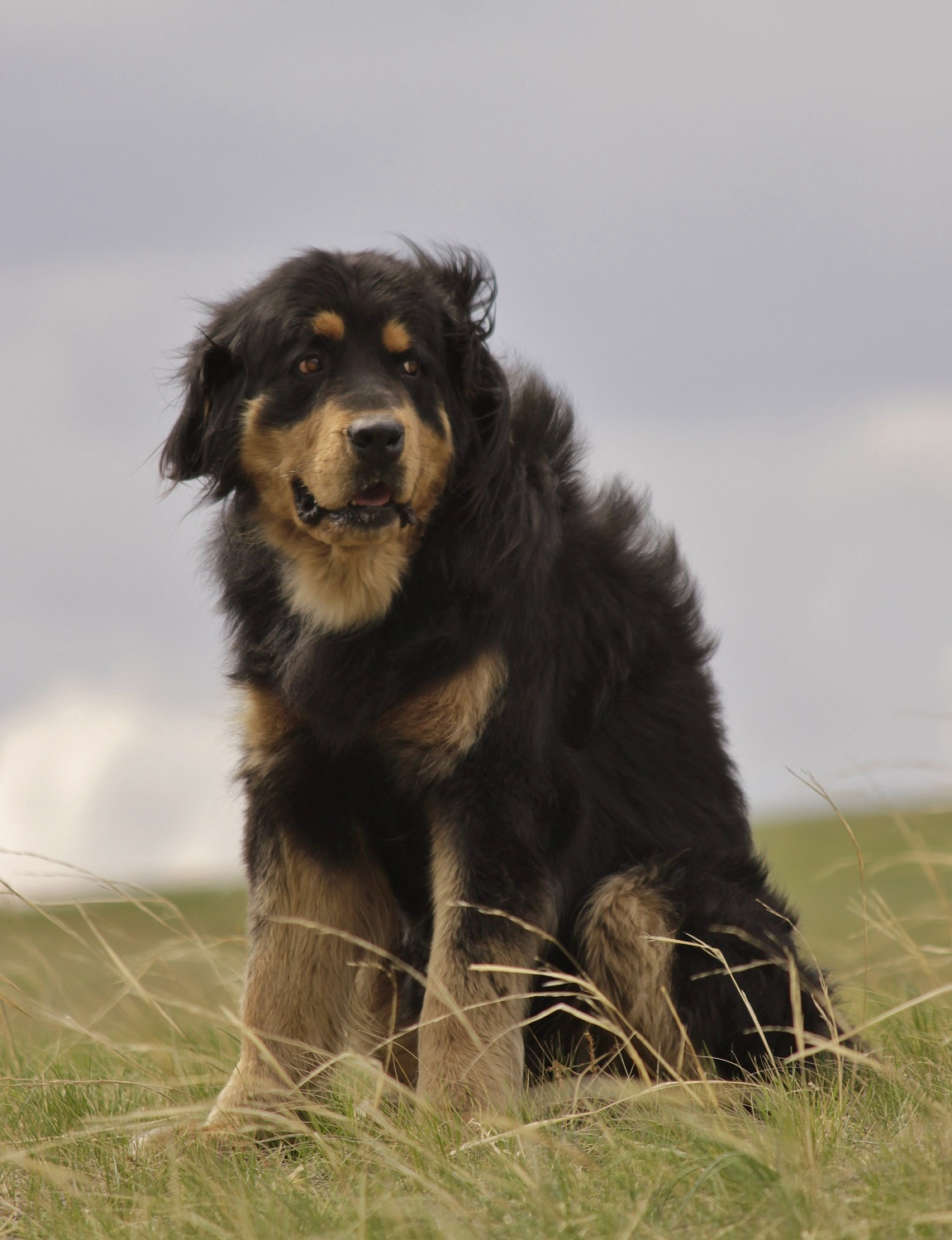
- Other names: Hotosho, Hotosho Nokhoy, Bankhar, Banhar, Mongolian Wolfhound
- Origin: Mongolia, Russia
Traits
- Height: up to 75 cm (29.5 inches)
- Weight: 50–60 kg (110–132 lbs)
- Color: red, black or black and tan

The Bankhar dog (Buryat: хотошо банхар, Mongolian: хоточ банхар, Russian: Бурят-монгольский волкодав), is a landrace livestock guarding dog. Originally bred by the Buryat-Mongol people, their success contributed to their spread across Buryatia and Mongolia and into adjacent regions before they were nearly annihilated in the mid-20th century. Bankhar dogs are prized for their intellect and perseverance even in hostile weather conditions. They are loyal and affectionate with their families, but formidable against intruders, including humans, wolves, eagles and snow leopards.

== Description ==
Bankhar dogs are a large, formidable breed with either a short or long coat in red, black, and black and tan. Darker dogs with light spots above the eyes are preferred, these are known as Mongolian Four Eye Dogs. The distinct markings help to distinguish dogs from wolves in low light conditions and Mongolian legend states that these dogs can see into the spirit world. Despite their size, they should be athletic, fast, cheerful, energetic, courageous and tireless dogs. In Buryat, they are called "hotosho", which means "yard wolf," and in Mongolian they are called "bankhar" meaning "chubby, fat, fluffy." Despite this name, Bankhar dogs are not a fat breed, just big at 50–60 kilograms (110–132 lbs) with a height of up to 75 centimeters (29.5 inches). Bankhar dogs have low calorie needs for their size. Despite their appearances, Bankhar dogs are only distantly related to the larger Tibetan Mastiff. Bankhar dogs are comparatively long-lived, averaging 15–18. Hip dysplasia and other joint issues are very rare. They breed once a year.

== History ==
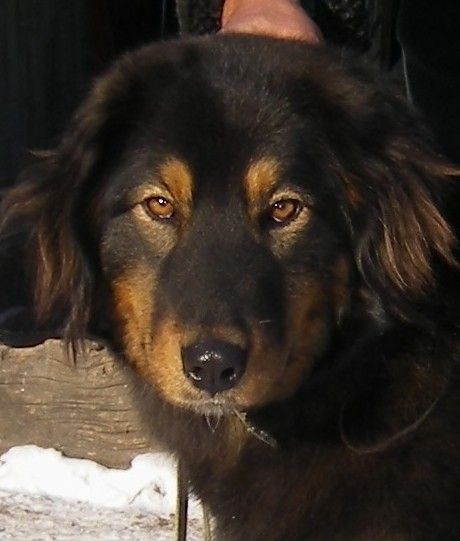
A Bankhar dog showing the favored "Four Eye Dog" markings

While undoubtedly an ancient breed, genetic analysis indicates that the Bankhar dog is a basal breed and may be the progenitor of all livestock guardian dogs. Buryat legend states that the breed appeared as a huge ferocious dog that accompanied a giant descending from the mountains. The descendants of this dog are the Bankhar dog. Bankhar dogs are alleged to have participated in the raids of Genghis Khan, instilling fear in people and helping to capture villages and cities.

Marco Polo was so impressed with the Bankhar dog that he brought one back home to Venice. Erich Von Salzmann describes this shepherd as a big, beautiful dog similar in size to a German Shepherd. It has a dark coat and is very fierce; the Bankhar attacks strangers mercilessly. Wilhelm Filchner gives an interesting account of a wild, big dog-monster the size of a bear. Children can play with these sensitive dogs, but these same dogs are not afraid of wolves and bears.

As infrastructure and travel made the Bankhar dog's native regions more accessible, non-native dogs began to intermix with the breed. During the Communist era of Mongolia, Bankhar dogs were let loose or exterminated to forcibly relocate nomadic groups into socialist-style settlements. Their pelts became fashionable for stylish Russian coats, and the largest dogs were killed to feed the growing dog coat industry. By the 1980s, the breed had almost disappeared.

The decline of effective livestock guarding dogs has caused nomadic herders to resort to shooting or poisoning any threats toward their herds. As a result, there has been a significant decrease in the populations of gray wolves and snow leopards in these regions. There has since been renewed interest to preserve the breed in Russia and Mongolia; however the breed is still endangered.
