= Qurdbasar =

Breed of dog

Gurdbasar
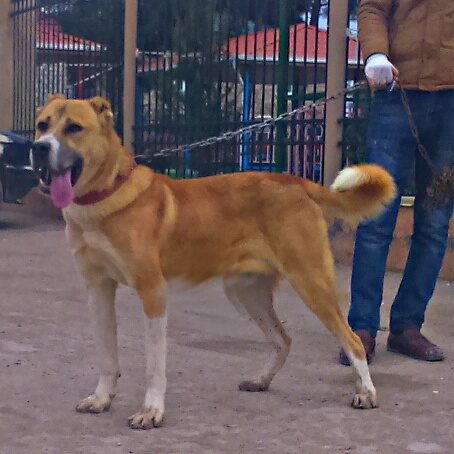
- Origin: Azerbaijan
Traits
| Height | Males | minimum 72 cm (28 in) |
| | Females | 65 cm (26 in) |
| Weight | Males | 55–65 kg (121–143 lb) |
| | Females | 45–50 kg (99–110 lb) |

Qurdbasar or Azerbaijani shepher dog is a livestock guardian dog breed of Azerbaijan. It is mainly used in sheep farming for management of the sheep flock.

Qurdbasar literally means 'wolf vanquisher' or 'wolf conqueror' in Azerbaijani.

== Spreading ==
This breed is mainly found in the territory of Azerbaijan, from where the breed originated. They are mainly found in farms within the Karabakh region, including the Fuzuli, Gubadli, Lachin, Kalbajar districts, as well as the Guba, Khizi, Shamakhi, Ismayilli, Gadabey, Lerik and Gazakh districts. Suitable for both mountainous and flat terrains, they are mainly kept in pastures and wintering areas.

== Service area ==
Historically, Gurdbasars were used to protect Azerbaijani caravans, flocks of sheep, properties and plots of land. They are distinguished by their loyalty to their owners and mistrust of strangers. Their physical properties and loyalty lead to their involvement in protection. Currently, the breed is mainly used to protect herds from wild animals.

== Breed Features ==
This breed has a medium-to-large build with supple, loose skin, often forming a visible fold at the nape of the neck. Full physical maturity is typically reached by the age of 3. Dogs that live beyond 15 years are considered long-lived for this breed.

The head is broad and muscular. The lower jaw is strong and can open widely, contributing to the dog’s powerful bite. The nose is large and typically black, while the teeth are well-developed and uniformly white. The breed also has a strong, muscular neck.

Size:

- Males: Height ~72 cm; Weight ~52 kg
- Females: Height ~66 cm; Weight ~42 kg

== Coat Types ==
The breed’s coat is dense, and individuals are classified into two types based on hair length:

- Sparse Type: Hair length ranges from 5 to 8 cm. In some cases, the tail may appear thick and densely coated.
- Short-Haired Type: Hair is short and dense. The underlying skin is tight and firm. Unlike other variations, this type lacks a thick mane around the neck.

== Temperament and Behavior ==
These dogs are known for their strong, compact build and naturally protective instincts. Their behavior is confident and assertive, especially when acting as guard dogs.

== Breed Standard Recognition ==
The official breed standard was approved under protocol No. 01-0208 during a meeting of the “Caucasian Dog Breeds” public association on February 7, 2008.

== Dog fights ==
The history of dog fighting in the territory of Azerbaijan goes back to ancient times. Fights were generally organized on holidays. Dogs are specially bred for this purpose. In order to minimize the weak points of dogs in fights, the ear and tail areas are clipped. This operation is usually performed when the dogs are still young. Even today, these fights still exist. Fans of dogfighting can be found in almost every region of Azerbaijan.

== Pictures ==
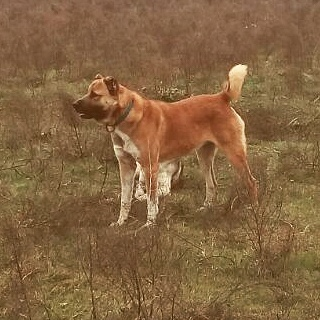

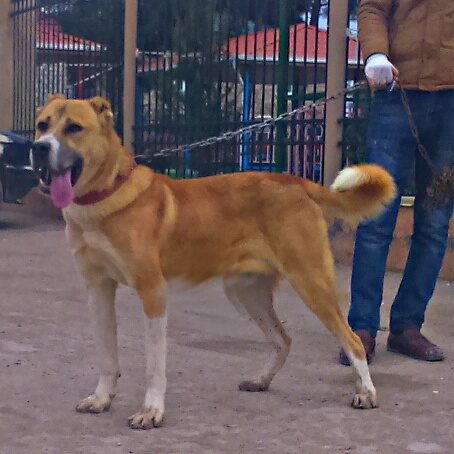

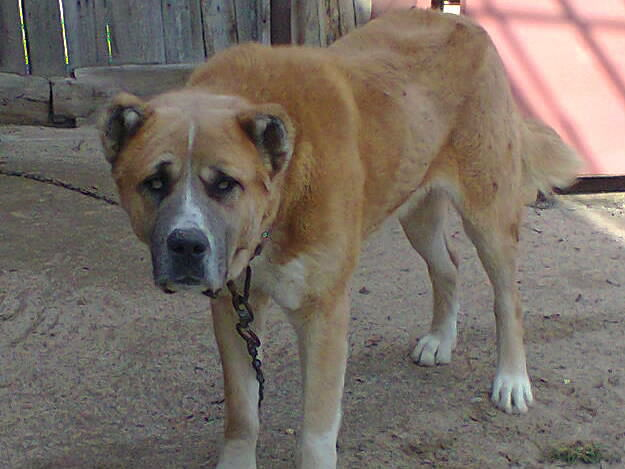

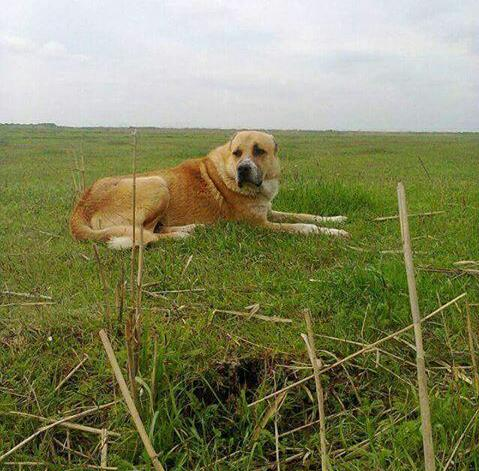
