= Alabay Statue =

- Alabaý heýkeli (Turkmen)
- Artist: Sargart Babaev
- Year: 2020
- Medium: Gilding
- Movement: Realism
- Subject: Alabay dog
- Dimensions: 15 m (49 ft)
- Location: Ashgabat, Turkmenistan

Alabay Statue (Turkmen: Alabaý heýkeli) is a gilded statue of an Alabay dog in Ashgabat, Turkmenistan. The 6 m (20 ft) tall statue stands on a 9 m (30 ft) pedestal at a roundabout of diameter 36 m (118 ft) along the Magtymguly Avenue between the Taslama and Tehran streets.

The statue was created by Turkemn artist Sargart Babaev on the orders of president Gurbanguly Berdimuhamedow. The idea to erect the monument was conceived in 2017, with several designs presented in October. The construction began in 2019 and was completed in autumn of 2020. It was officially opened in November 2020.
