= Aidi =

Dog breed

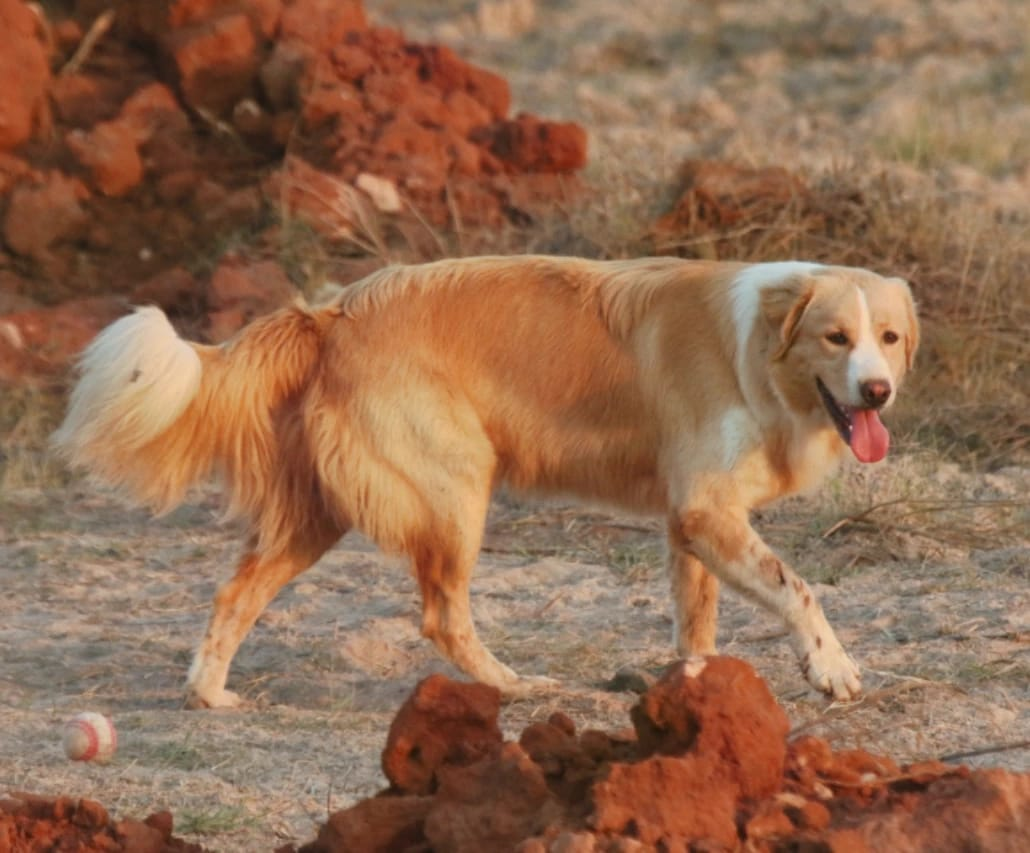
- Tricolour Aidi
- Other names: Aïdi; Atlas Mountain Dog; Atlas Shepherd Dog; Berber Dog
- Origin: Morocco
Traits
- Height: 52–62 cm (20–24 in)
- Weight: 25 kg (55 lb)
- Coat: Thick, medium-length
- Color: Black, brown, brindle, cream or cream sable, or red or red sable, all with or without black mask or any amount of white
Kennel club standards
- Fédération Cynologique Internationale: standard

The Aidi is a dog breed native to the Atlas Mountains of North Africa and is used as a livestock guardian, protecting herds of sheep and goats. It is most commonly found in Morocco, which holds the standard under the Fédération Cynologique Internationale. The Aidi is also found in Algeria, Tunisia and Libya. It possesses hunting capabilities and good scenting ability. In Morocco, it is often paired in hunting with the Sloughi, which chases down prey that the Aidi has located by scent.

== History ==
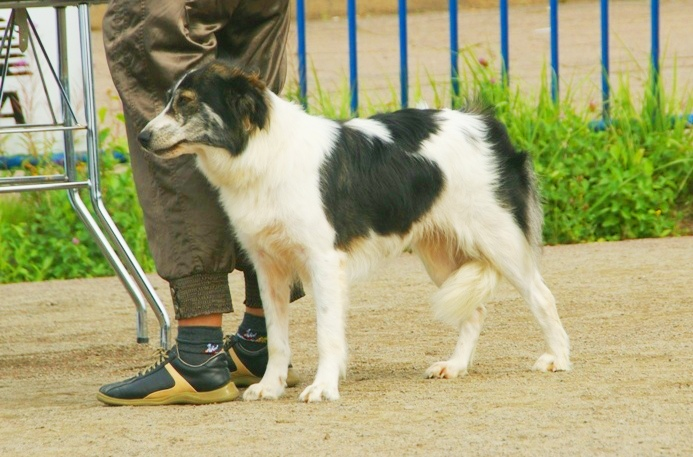
Female Aidi in a dog show

The Aidi is a breed native to the Atlas Mountains of North Africa. Despite being initially referred to as the Atlas Sheepdog in the 1963 standard, the Aidi has never been used as a sheepdog, and this misnomer was corrected in 1969. Known for its courage, the Aidi has traditionally lived and worked in the Atlas Mountains, providing protection to its owner and property against wildcats, predators, and strangers.

The breed has also been referred to as the Berber, named after the Berber tribes who utilized the dog. The Aidi shares some ancestral resemblance with the pariah dog. In the past, it played a vital role as a protector for desert nomad tribes, with the most alert and aggressive dogs stationed around the camp perimeter at night. Historically, the Aidi has not received the same level of admiration from the tribes as breeds like the Sloughi, which are considered noble. However, a club has recently been formed in Morocco to preserve the breed's purity due to its significant contributions as a protector, hunter, police dog, and companion.

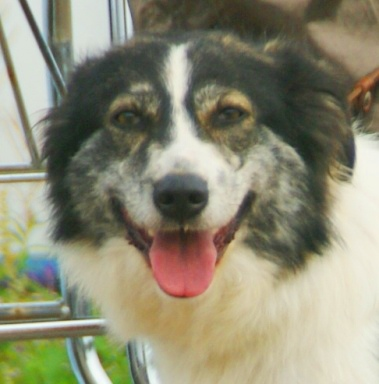
Head of the Aidi

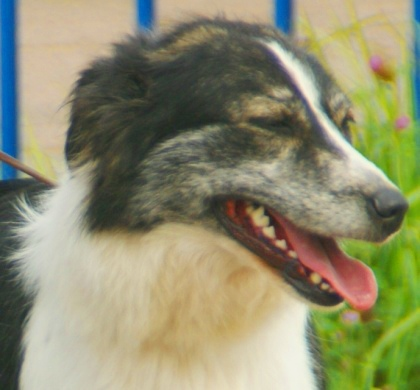
Head of the Aidi

While the Aidi has primarily been used as a working dog, it has also gained popularity as a household pet in urban areas. When given sufficient tasks and exercise, the Aidi can adapt well to an urban environment and make a content and fulfilled companion.

In terms of color and flock-guarding abilities, the Aidi shares many characteristics with other livestock guardian dog breeds.

== Appearance ==
Standing 52–62 cm (20–24 in) in height and weighing around 25 kg (55 lb), the Aidi's lean, muscular body is protected by a coarse, thick, weather-resistant coat with a heavy plumed tail. The coat is heavy and soft. The head is bear-like and in proportion to the rest of the body. The breed has a tapered muzzle with a black or brown nose that usually matches the coat. Their jaws are strong with tight black or brown lips. The medium-sized ears are tipped forward and drop slightly. The eyes are medium, with a dark color and dark rims. Coat colours are white, black, black and white, pale red, and tawny. In some regions of Morocco, the ears are cropped and the tail is docked.

== See also ==
- List of dog breeds
