= Livestock guardian dog =

Dog type bred to protect livestock

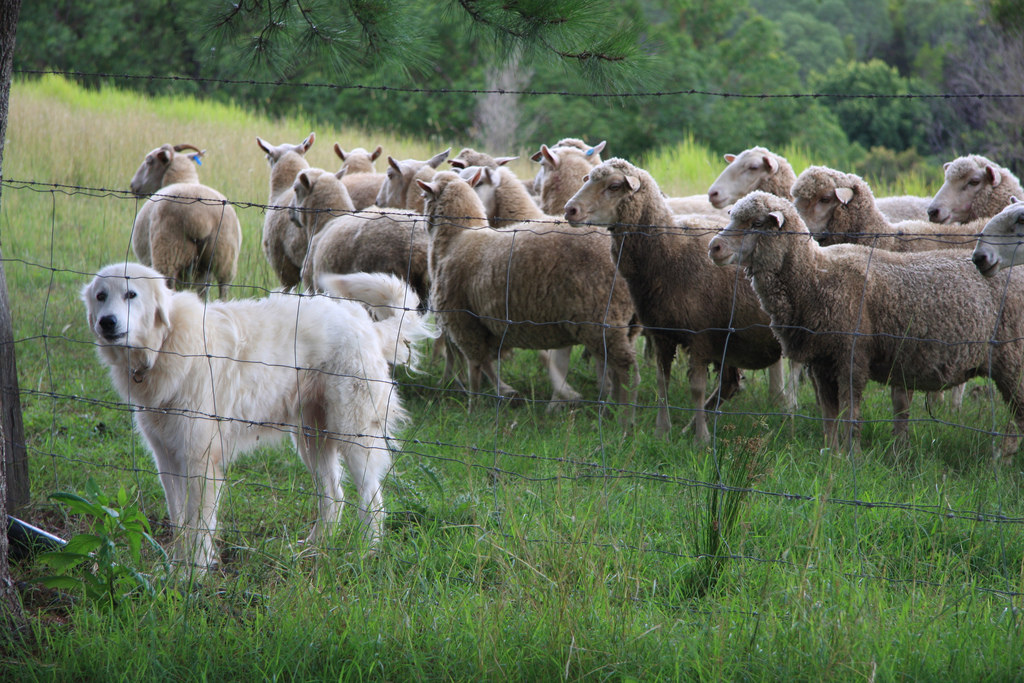
A Maremma Sheepdog guarding a flock of sheep in Australia

The livestock guardian or flock guardian dog is a type of dog bred to protect livestock from predators.

Livestock guardian dogs stay with the group of animals they protect as a full-time member of the flock or herd. Their ability to guard their herd is mainly instinctive, as the dog is bonded to the herd from an early age. Unlike herding dogs which control the movement of livestock, they blend in with them, watching for intruders within the flock. They confront predators with vocal intimidation, barking and displaying aggression. This is often enough to ward off predators; dogs may attack or fight with those that cannot be driven away.

== History ==
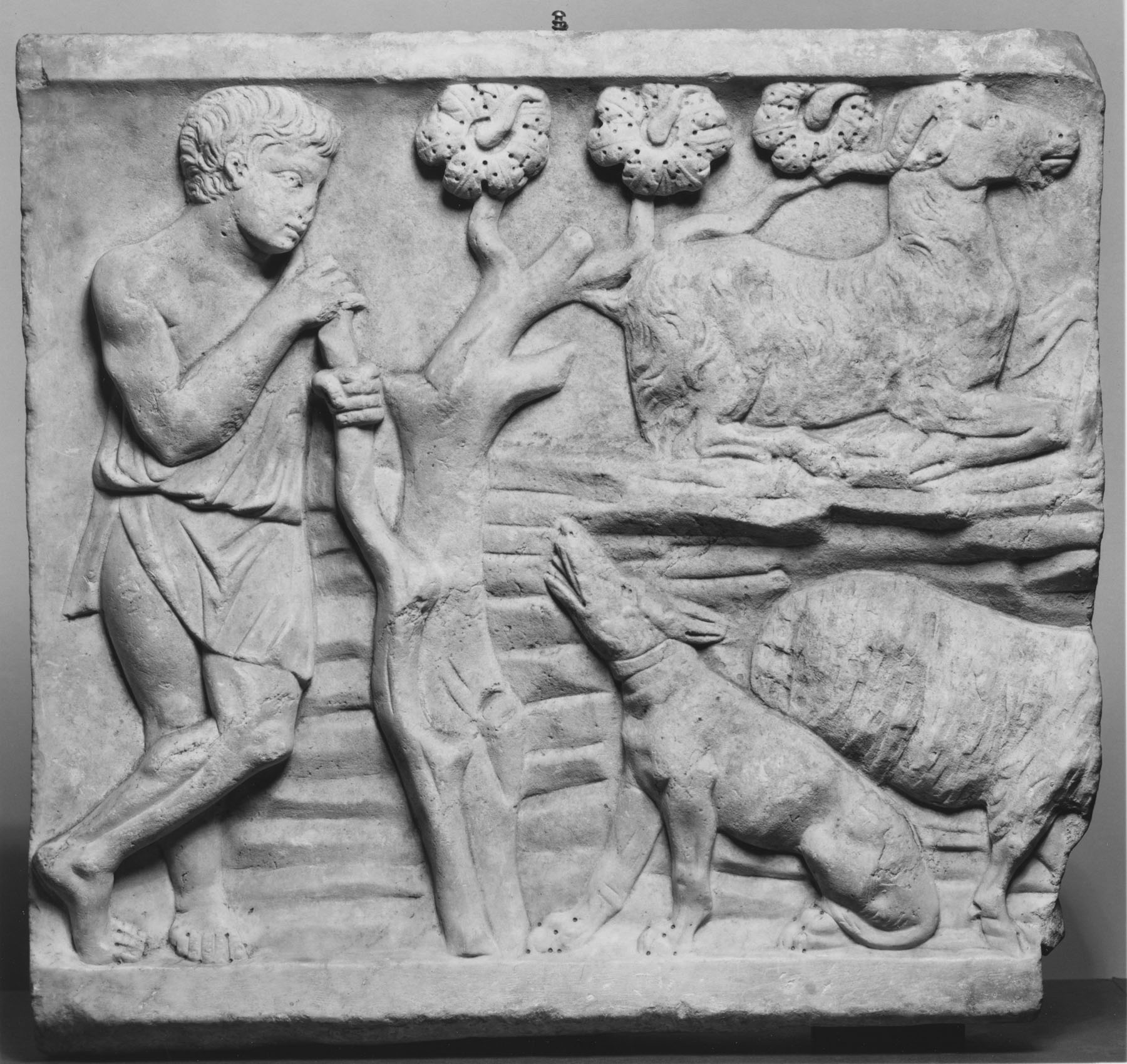
Relief from a Roman sarcophagus depicting a herdsman and his dog, second or third century AD

Herding dogs originated in Western Asia, on the territory of modern Iran and Iraq in association with the beginning of livestock breeding. Domestication of sheep and goats began there in the eighth and seventh millennia BC. In this era, shepherding was a difficult job: the first shepherds did not have horses and managed livestock on foot, as mules, horses and donkeys were not yet fully domesticated and obedient enough. Dogs that previously were helping humans to hunt became assistants in farming. The main task of dogs in the early period was to protect herds from a variety of wild predators, which were very numerous at that time.

This function predetermined the type of herding dogs: they had to be strong, vicious, courageous, decisive, able to stand alone against a large predator and, most importantly, ready to defend their herd. The ancestors of livestock guarding dogs can be traced back around six thousand years. The land of their origin is considered to be the territories of modern Turkey, Iraq and Syria.

Livestock dogs are mentioned in the Old Testament, the works of Cato the Elder and Varro. Images are found on works of art created more than two thousand years ago.

Their use being recorded as early as 150 BC in Rome. Both Aristotle's History of Animals and Virgil's Georgics mention the use of livestock guardian dogs by the Molossians in the ancient region of Epirus.

== Purpose and working features ==
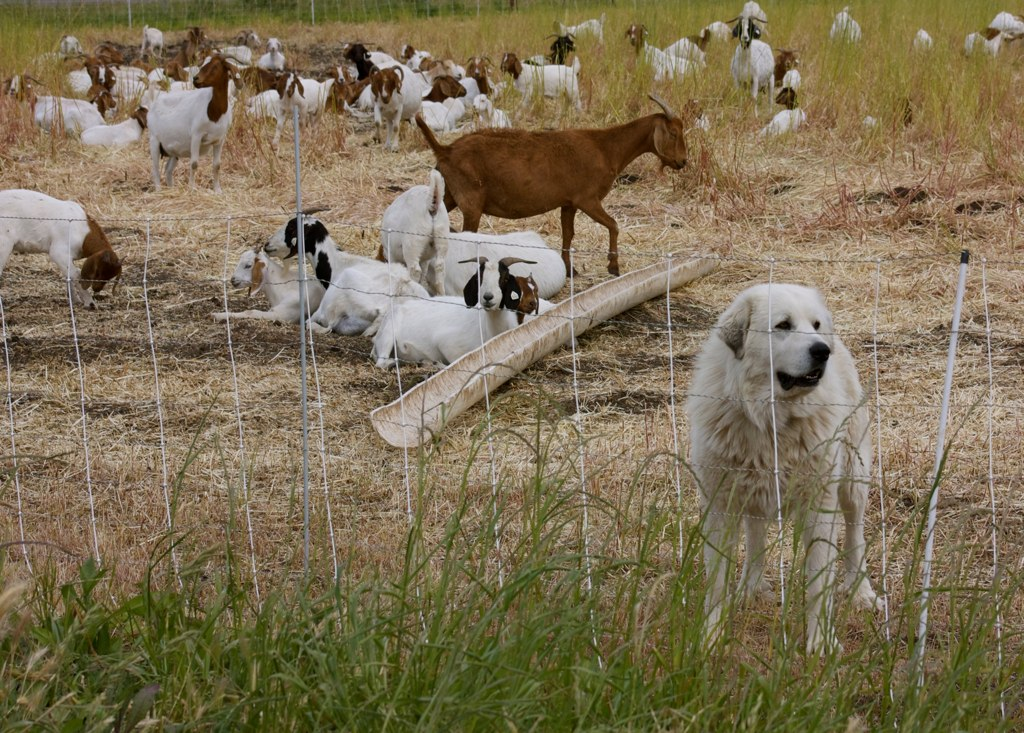
A Pyrenean Mountain Dog with a herd of goats

Livestock guardian dogs specialise in protection of small farm animals, mainly sheep. Unlike herds of cattle or horses, which are able to withstand even large predators on their own, herds of sheep and goats need the protection that LGDs are designed to provide. In large farms, sheep are managed mainly by using the distant-pasture method. In winter the flocks are kept in low-lying pastures or in paddocks, and in the summer they are moved to remote regions, often to the mountains, where there is enough grass during the summer drought. LGDs guard livestock on pastures throughout the year, and also protect sheep from attacks of predators during seasonal migrations.

The dogs are introduced to livestock as puppies so they "imprint" on the animals. Experts recommend that the pups begin living with the herd at 4 to 5 weeks of age. This imprinting is thought to be largely olfactory and occurs between 3 and 16 weeks of age. Training requires regular daily handling and management, preferably from birth. A guardian dog is not considered reliable until it is at least 2 years of age. Until that time, supervision, guidance, and correction are needed to teach the dog the skills and rules it needs to do its job. Having older dogs that assist in training younger dogs streamlines this process considerably. Trials are underway to protect penguins with LGDs.

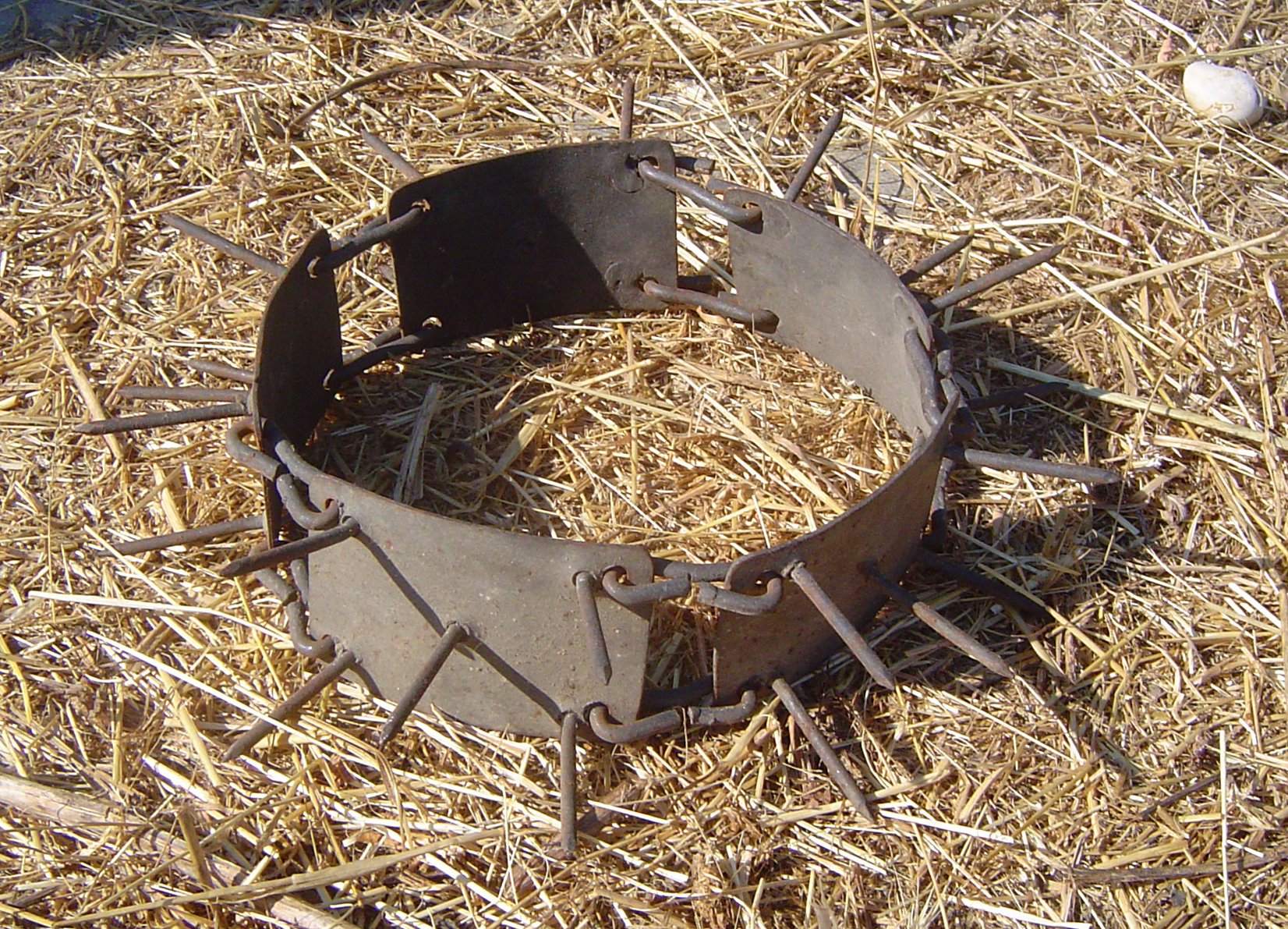
A "wolf-collar", commonly used as a neck-protection by LGDs against predators

In Namibia in Southwest Africa, Anatolians are used to guard goat herds from cheetahs, and are typically imprinted between 7 and 8 weeks of age. Before use of dogs was implemented, impoverished Namibian farmers often came into conflict with predatory cheetahs; now, Anatolians usually are able to drive off cheetahs with their barking and displays of aggression.

The experiments of Lorna and Raymond Coppinger and the studies of other specialists have shown the effectiveness of protecting flocks with the help of dogs. After the reintroduction of wolves, that were eliminated in the United States in the 1930s, American farmers were losing about a million sheep annually to wolf attacks. 76 farmers took part in the Coppingers program, which introduced European livestock guardian dogs into the US sheep breeding (in their project they used Anatolian Shepherd Dogs). In all farms, where, in the absence of dogs, up to two hundred attacks of wolves per year happened, not a single sheep was lost under the protection of LGDs. At the same time, none of the predators protected by law got killed: the dogs simply did not allow them to approach the herd.

For the protection of flocks, on average, five dogs are used per 350 heads of sheep, but the need for LGDs depends on many conditions, such as the landscape and size of the territory, vegetation available in the pasture area, the species, breed and number of animals in the herd, the presence of a shepherd, the presence or absence of fences and other means of protection, the number and species composition of predators, as well as the breed, age, health status of LGDs and their experience.

For example, sheep breeders of the Rocky Mountains in the United States breed predominantly white-headed Rambouillet sheep with a strong herd instinct. During the day, the sheep scatter over the pasture that is about one square mile, and at night they gather in a denser flock. In an ordinary flock of a thousand ewes and their lambs, two to five guard dogs live constantly. The number of dogs in a herd can change with their death or the birth of puppies. When the herds gather together for the winter, some dogs can move to another herd and spend the next summer guarding other sheep. When large predators appear near pastures, the number of dogs in the flock usually increases. Protection is more reliable if the herd is guarded by dogs of different breeds, for example, powerful Pyrenean mastiffs, who prefer to lie close to livestock, in cooperation with more mobile Maremmas or Kangals, who control the perimeter of the pasture.

== Traits ==
=== Temperament and working ethic ===
A Kazakh shepherd with his horse and guardian dogs

The three qualities most sought after in LGDs are trustworthiness, attentiveness, and protectiveness; trustworthy in that they do not roam off and are not aggressive with the livestock, attentive in that they are situationally aware of threats by predators, and protective in that they attempt to drive off predators. Dogs, being social creatures with differing personalities, take on different roles with the herd and among themselves; most stick close to the livestock, others tend to follow the shepherd or rancher when one is present, and some drift away from the livestock. These differing roles are often complementary in terms of protecting livestock, and experienced ranchers and shepherds sometimes encourage these differences by adjustments in socialisation technique so as to increase the effectiveness of their group of dogs in meeting specific predator threats. LGDs that follow the livestock closest assure that a guard dog is on hand if a predator attacks, while LGDs that patrol at the edges of a flock or herd are in a position to keep would-be attackers at a safe distance from livestock. Those dogs that are more attentive tend to alert those that are more passive, but perhaps also more trustworthy or less aggressive with the livestock.

At least two dogs may be placed with a flock or herd, depending on its size, the type of predators, their number, and the intensity of predation. If predators are scarce, one dog may be adequate, though most operations usually require at least two dogs. Large operations (particularly range operations) and heavy predator loads require more dogs. Male and female LGDs have proved to be equally effective in protecting of livestock.

While LGDs have been known to fight to the death with predators, in most cases, predator attacks are prevented by a display of aggressiveness. LGDs are known to drive off predators for which physically they would be no match, such as bears and even lions. With the reintroduction of predators into natural habitats in Europe and North America, environmentalists have come to appreciate LGDs because they allow sheep and cattle farming to coexist with predators in the same or nearby habitats. Unlike trapping and poisoning, LGDs seldom kill predators; instead, their aggressive behaviours tend to condition predators to seek unguarded (thus, nonfarm animal) prey. For instance, in Italy's Gran Sasso and Monti della Laga National Park, where LGDs and wolves have coexisted for centuries, older, more experienced wolves seem to "know" the LGDs and leave their flocks alone.

=== Physical traits ===
LGDs are large, powerful dogs. The large size provides guardian dogs with a number of advantages: they retain heat longer, carry more fat reserves and can go without food for longer, are less likely to get bone fractures and tolerate illnesses better. Their stride is longer, so they are more efficient at long distances. However, dogs that are too large suffer more from the heat, therefore they are used exclusively in the colder regions and in mountain pastures. Livestock guardian dogs working with the herds in hot areas are lighter in bone and shorter.

All LGDs have similar physical traits. Differences in appearance reflect the peculiarities of the climate in which these dogs live and work. All LGDs have a dense water-repellent coat, strong build, and independent disposition. Differences in the colour are determined by local traditions: puppies of a typical colour were given preference for breeding in different regions. Rigg notes that often the color of dogs is chosen according to the main color of the livestock: in flocks of white sheep, the dogs are white, with coloured sheep, goats or yaks, the dogs are usually grey or brown. It is assumed that animals are calmer about being in a presence of dogs of a similar colour. In addition, the color of the dog corresponding to the color of the herd reduces the risk of accidental death of the dog when shooting wolves.

== Livestock guardian dogs in the modern world ==
LGDs are generally large, independent, and protective, which can make them less than ideal for urban or even suburban living. Nonetheless, despite their size, they can be gentle, make good companion dogs, and are often protective towards children. If introduced to a family as a pup, most LGDs are as protective of their family as a working guard dog is of its flock. In fact, in some communities where LGDs are a tradition, the runt of a litter often was kept or given as a household pet or simply kept as a village dog without a single owner.

For various reasons, including the decline in livestock and the transition to other methods of livestock breeding and management, in many regions, the number of LGDs has critically declined. Instead of their original purpose, livestock guardian dogs are more often used to guard property, bred as show dogs with a spectacular appearance, and sometimes used in the dog fight business. The breed standards used by canine organisations in purebred breeding and their selection process are mainly focused on physical characteristics and not on their ability to protect the herd. In the absence of a traditional guarding purpose and selection associated with it, hereditary guarding skills and key working qualities of LGDs get lost.

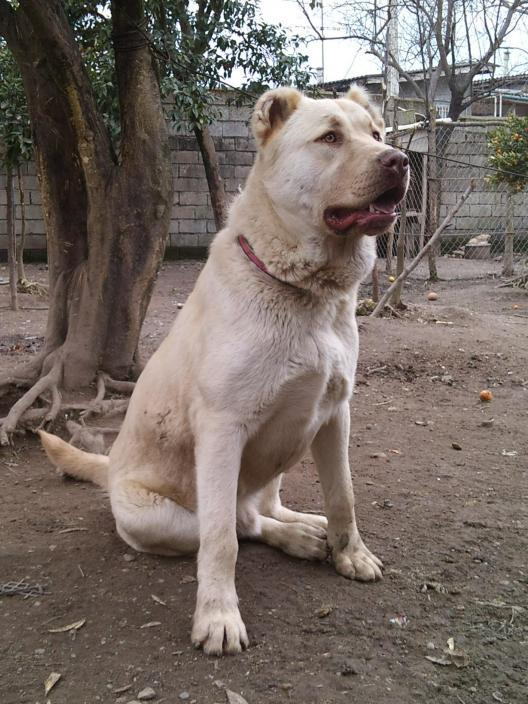
Kuchi dog in Afghanistan

Some breeds of LGDs are kept mainly as pets (Pyrenean mountain dog). Some working breeds (the Karakachan dog in Bulgaria, the Portuguese LGD breeds) are on the verge of extinction, others (Kuchi dog in Afghanistan, the Mazandarani saga dog in Iran) are considered completely lost.

Nonetheless, livestock breeding remains an important part of agriculture, and livestock guardian dogs are still the most efficient and sustainable way of protecting the herds. LGDs invariably remain an integral part of the industry in places of traditional sheep breeding where large carnivores have survived, such as the Carpathian and Balkan regions, in central Italy, on the Iberian Peninsula, in the mountain regions of the Middle East and Central Asia.

In Western and Northern Europe, where large predators were reintroduced in the end of the 20th century, shepherds are going back to using LGDs as the only way to protect farm animals from harm in a way that is not lethal to legally protected predators. Thanks to this advantage, LGDs are now used to protect herds in the US, Scandinavia, and a number of African countries, even despite the absence of such a tradition in these regions. The use of livestock guardian dogs for the protection of herds reduces losses of animals between 11% and 100%, without requiring significant investments, special technologies and government assistance. Attempts to return the LGDs into agriculture are supported by government programs and public organisations in a number of countries.

== List of breeds ==
Many breeds of LGDs are little known outside of the regions where they are still worked. Nevertheless, some breeds are known to display traits advantageous to guarding livestock. Some specialist LGD breeds include:

=== Extant breeds ===
Breed	Other name(s)	Country of origin.	. Image
Aidi	Aïdi; Atlas Mountain Dog; Atlas Shepherd Dog; Berber Dog; Chien de l'Atlas; Chien de Montagne de l'Atlas	Morocco	
Akbash dog	Akbaş Çoban Köpeği	Turkey	
Aksaray Malaklisi	Turkish mastiff; Central Anatolian shepherd	Turkey	
Armenian Gampr	Gampr	Armenia	
Bakharwal dog	Kashmir Shepherd	India	
Bernese Mountain Dog	Berner Sennenhund	Switzerland	
Bucovina Shepherd	Bucovina Sheepdog; Southeastern European Shepherd	Romania (in the Bukovina region)	
Buryat-Mongolian Wolfhound		Mongolia, Russia	
Cão de Castro Laboreiro	Dog of Castro Laboreiro; Portuguese Cattle Dog; Portuguese Watchdog	Portugal	
Cão de Gado Transmontano	Transmontano Mastiff; Transmontano Cattle Dog	Portugal	
Carpathian Shepherd Dog	Ciobănesc Românesc Carpatin; Romanian Shepherd; Romanian Carpathian Shepherd; Câine Ciobănesc Carpatin; Carpathian Sheepdog; Carpatin; Romanian Carpatin Herder	Romania	
Caucasian Shepherd Dog	Caucasian Mountain Dog; Nagazi	Georgia, Armenia, Azerbaijan	
Central Asian Shepherd Dog	Alabai; Central Asian Ovtcharka; Aziat	Afghanistan, Kazakhstan, Kyrgyzstan, Turkmenistan, Uzbekistan, Russia	
Estrela Mountain Dog	Portuguese Shepherd; Cão da Serra da Estrela	Portugal	
Georgian Shepherd	Georgian Mountain Dog; Nagazi	Georgia	
Greek Shepherd		Greece	
Great Swiss Mountain Dog	Grosser Schweizer Sennenhund	Switzerland	
Gurdbasar	Azerbaijani wolfhound	Azerbaijan	
Hovawart		Germany	
Himalayan Sheepdog	Himalayan Shepherd; Himalayan Shepherd Dog	India|Nepal	
Kurdish Mastiff	Kurdish Dog or Pshdar Dog	Iraqi Kurdistan, Iranian Kurdistan	
Kangal	Sivas Kangal; Turkish Kangal	Turkey	
Karakachan	Karakachansko Kuche; Karakachanska Ovcharka	Bulgaria	
Kars		Turkey	
Karst Shepherd	Kraski Ovcar	Slovenia	
Komondor	Hungarian Komondor; Hungarian Sheepdog	Hungary	
Koyun dog	Bayburt Kelpi	Turkey	
Kuchi	Sage Kuchi; Sage Jangi; De Kochyano Spai; Jangi Spai; Afghan Shepherd	Afghanistan	
Kuvasz	Hungarian Kuvasz	Hungary	
Leonberger		Germany	
Maremmano-Abruzzese Sheepdog	Maremma Sheepdog; Cane da Pastore Maremmano-Abruzzese; Pastore Abruzzese; Pastore Maremmano; Abruzzo Sheepdog; Abruzzese Sheepdog	Italy	
Mioritic Shepherd	Romanian Mioritic Shepherd Dog; Romanian Mioritic; Ciobănesc Românesc Mioritic; Mioritic	Romania	
Mucuchies		Venezuela	
Persian Mastiff	Sarabi Mastiff	Iran	
Polish Tatra Sheepdog	Tatra Mountain Sheepdog; Owczarek Tatrzański; Owczarek Podhalański; Polski Owczarek	Poland	
Pshdar dog	Kurdish Shepherd Dog; Peshdar Dog; Kurdish Dog; Kurdish Mastiff	Iran, Iraq	
Pyrenean Mastiff	Mastín del Pirineo; Mostín d'o Pireneu; Mastin d'Aragon	Spain	
Pyrenean Mountain Dog	Great Pyrenees; Patou; Montañés del Pirineo; Perro de Montaña de los Pirineos; Can de Montaña de os Perinés; Chien des Pyrénées; Chien de Montagne des Pyrénées	France, Spain	
Rafeiro do Alentejo	Alentejo Mastiff; Portuguese Mastiff	Portugal	
Romanian Raven Shepherd Dog	Ciobanesc Romanesc Corb	Romania	
Šarplaninac	Yugoslavian Shepherd Dog	Serbia; Albania; North Macedonia; Kosovo	
Slovak Cuvac	Slovak Chuvach; Tatransky Cuvac; Slovak tschuvatsch	Slovakia	
South Russian Ovcharka	Youjnorousskaïa Ovtcharka; South Russian Sheepdog; Ukrainian Ovcharka; Yuzhak; South Russian Shepherd	Russia, Ukraine	
Spanish Mastiff	Mastín español de campo y trabajo; Mastín ganadero; Mastín Leonés; Mastín Extremeño	Spain	
Tibetan kyi apso	Apso Do-Kyi	Tibet	
Tibetan Mastiff		Tibet	
Tobet	Kazakhstan mountain dog	Kazakhstan	
Torkuz	Sarkangik	Uzbekistan	
Tornjak	Bosnian and Herzegovinian Shepherd Dog; Bosnian Shepherd Dog; Croatian Mountain Dog; Bosnian-Herzegovinian and Croatian Shepherd Dog	Bosnia and Herzegovina, Croatia	
Vikhan Sheepdog	Chitral Watchdog; Pakistani Vikhan Dog	Pakistan	

=== List of extinct breeds ===
Breed	Alternate name(s)	Country or region of origin	Era	Use	Image
Alpine Mastiff	—	Alps	Before 5th century BC to 19th century AD	Livestock guardian	

== See also ==
- Guard dog
