= Sarabi dog =

Breed of livestock guardian dog

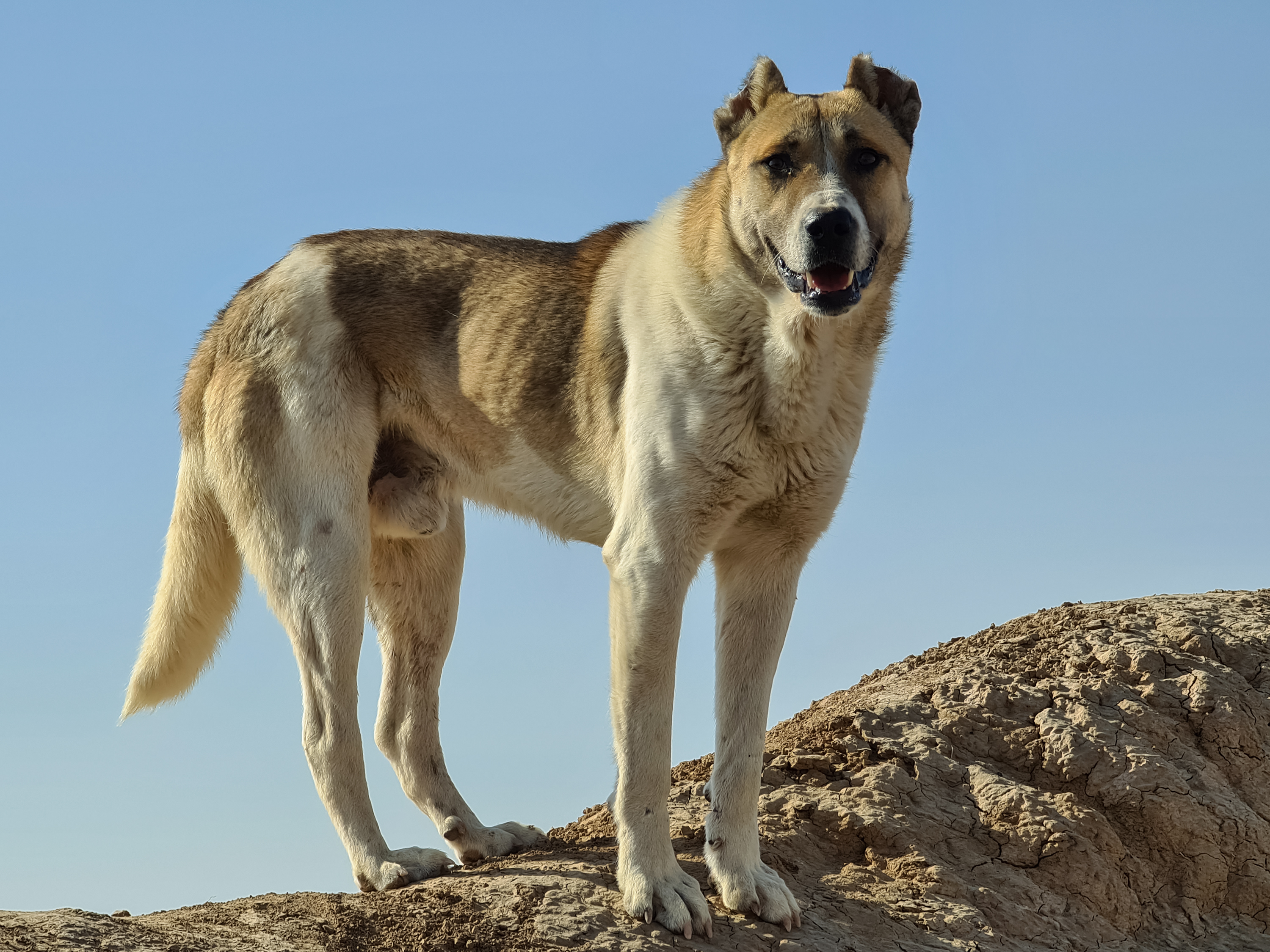
- A Sarabi at Dayr-e Gachin, Qom province
- Origin: Iran
Traits
Height	Males	80–100 cm (31–39 in)
	Females	70–85 cm (28–33 in)
Weight	Males	65–100 kg (143–220 lb)
	Females	60–80 kg (130–180 lb)
- Coat: Short, with undercoat
- Colour: Fawn, sable, black

The Sarabi dog or Iranian mastiff (Persian: سرابی) is a large breed of livestock guardian dog named after and originating from the Sarab County in Iran. Sarabi dogs have been used for centuries to protect herds from Syrian brown bear, Indian wolf, golden jackal, striped hyena, Persian leopard the largest leopard subspecies, and the extinct Caspian tiger. The Sarabi mastiff is calm, controlled, independent, powerful and protective; the breed is also used to compete in staged dog fights and as a hunting dog. The breed is considered one of the oldest and most powerful indigenous dog breeds in Iran; the larger and heavier an individual dog is, the greater its value.

== See also ==
- List of dog breeds
