= Turkish Standards Institution =

Turkish standards development organization

- Abbreviation: TSE
- Formation: 1954
- Purpose: National standards, conformity assessment
- Headquarters: Ankara
- Region served: Worldwide
- Official language: Turkish
- President: Mahmut Sami Şahin
- Staff: 2716 employees (as of 2020)
- Website: tse.org.tr

The Turkish Standards Institution (Turkish: Türk Standardları Enstitüsü) is a public standards organization whose mission is to increase the competitiveness of Turkey, facilitating trade on national and international levels and develop society's standard of living by providing standardization and conformity assessment in diverse fields.

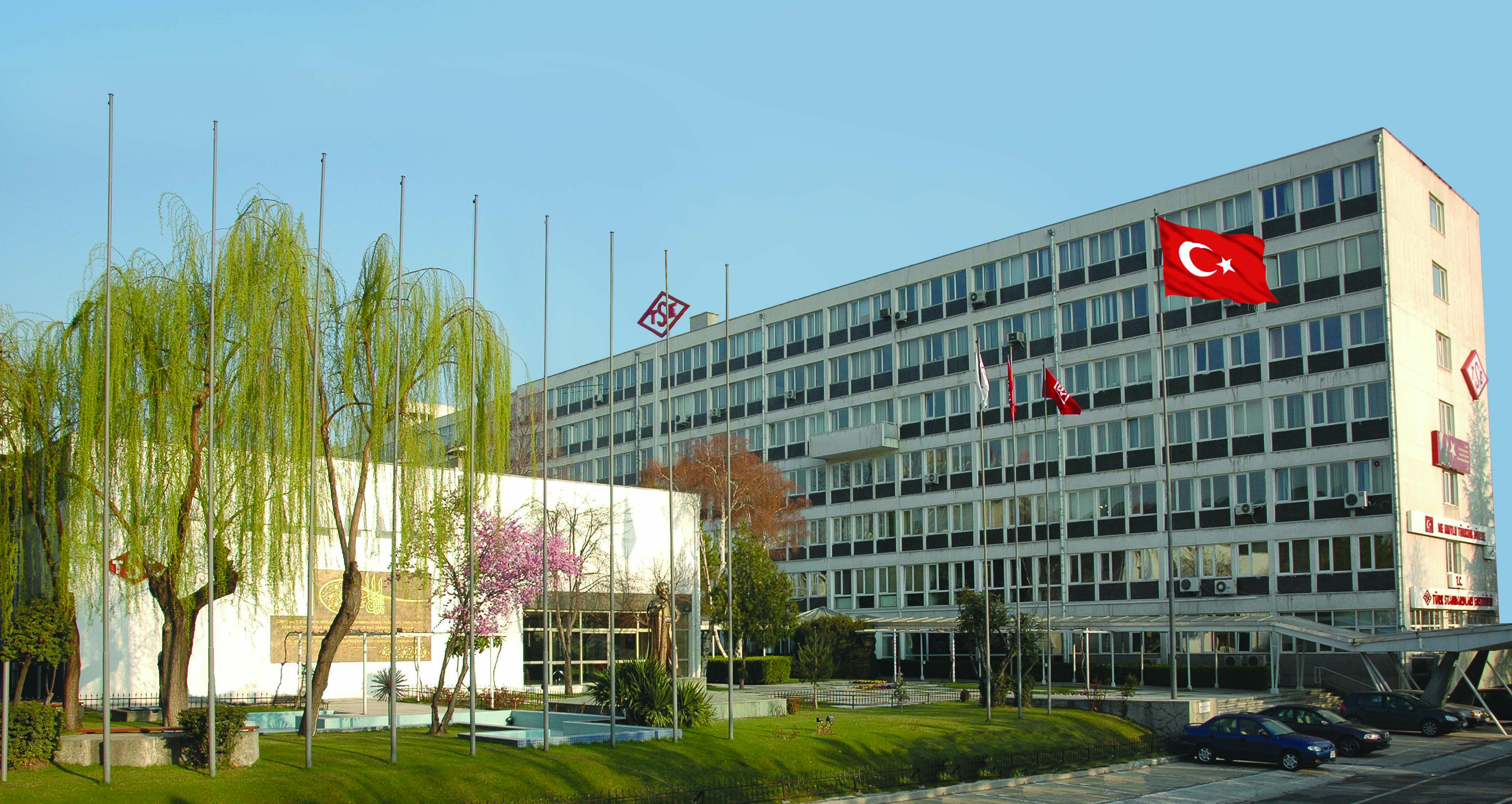
Head office in Ankara

== History and Structure ==
The institution was established in 1954 within the Union of Chambers and Commodity Exchanges of Turkey. With the passage of Turkish Law No. 132 in Turkish Parliament on November 18, 1960, it gained a separate legal entity and completed its establishment process. It is recognized by the Turkish government as the only national standards body of the country and represents Turkish interests at international standardization platforms. The head office is in Ankara; it has ten regional coordination departments in major metropolitan areas of Turkey and a large campus in Gebze, hosting most of its quality testing laboratories in a close proximity to main industrial and commercial hubs around Istanbul. It has representation and coordination offices in Azerbaijan, Kazakhstan, Uzbekistan, Northern Cyprus and Saudi Arabia.

== Activities ==
The institution publishes and adopts standards in order to enable industrialists to produce goods and services in compliance with rules, laws, codes and standards applicable in global markets. It also conducts training programs, and it has operations in various fields of conformity assessment such as inspection and surveillance, product certification, management systems certification, personnel certification, testing and calibration.

As a notified body of several international schemes, it enables clients based in Turkey and other countries to gain access into the European and Gulf markets by ensuring that their products meet all CE mark requirements according to European Directives/Regulations and G-mark requirements according to GSO regulations, as well as by providing Halal certificates in compliance with SMIIC standards.

The institution cooperates with other public bodies in Turkey over inspection and surveillance activities concerning consumer safety. It is authorised by the Ministry of Trade as the sole body that performs import controls of fertilizers as well as a large group of mechanical and electronic items before the release into Turkish market. It is authorised by the Ministry of Industry and Technology to perform country-wide inspections of measuring devices such as dispensers, counters, volumetric meters of petroleum products and scales weighing above 2000 kg. Under a similar authorisation of the Ministry of Industry and Technology, it inspects the projects related to production, modification and assembly of vehicles as it has vehicle inspection centers in 69 provinces of Turkey.

== International membership ==
It is a member of:

- International Organization for Standardization
- International Electrotechnical Commission, since 1956
- Standards and Metrology Institute for Islamic Countries, since 2010
- European Committee for Standardization
- European Committee for Electrotechnical Standardization, since 2012
- European Organization for Quality, since 1976
- International Certification Network, since 2008
