= Caucasian Shepherd Dog =

Russian breed of livestock guardian dog

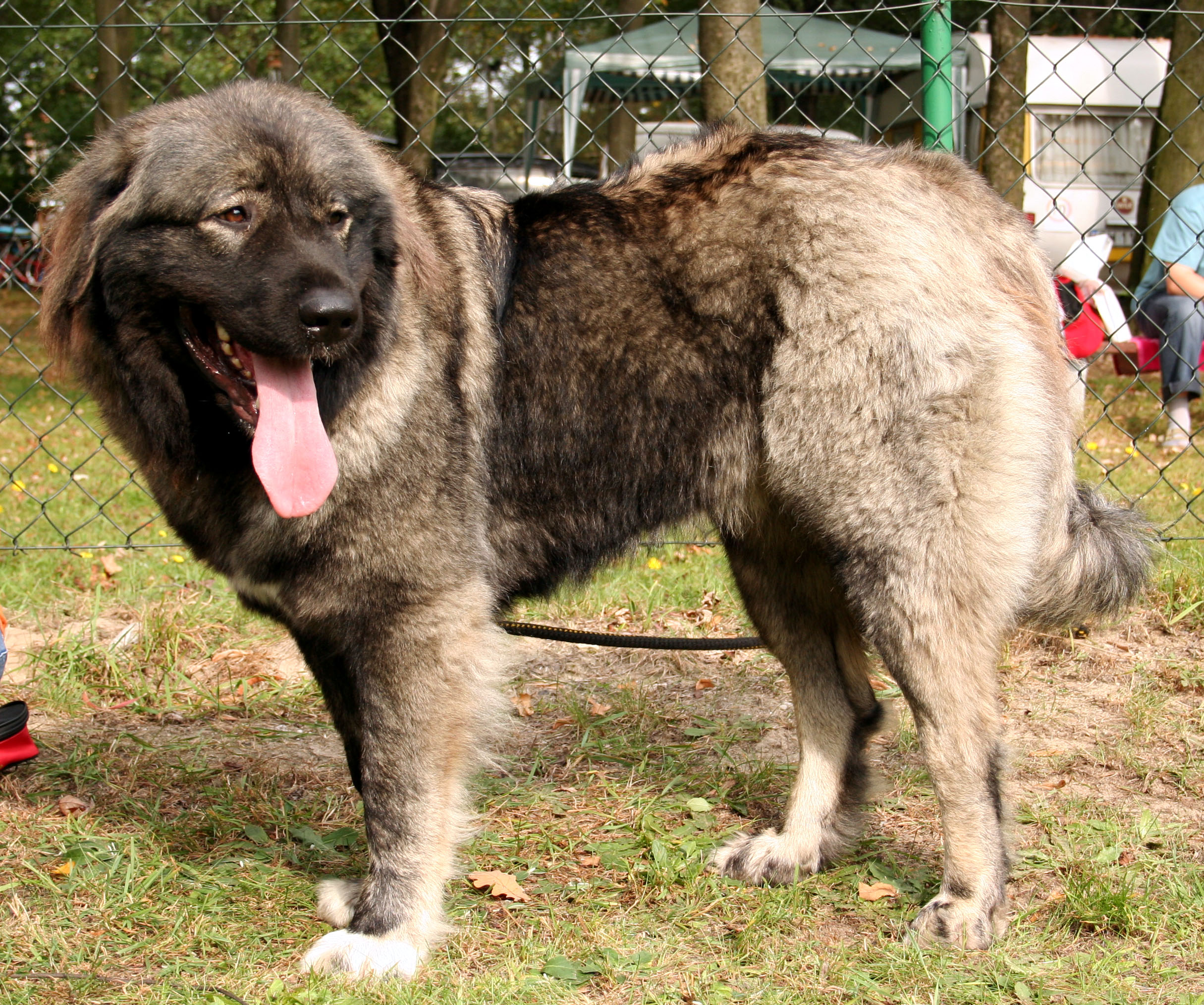
- Other names: Caucasian Mountain Dog; Caucasian Ovcharka; Caucasian Owtcharka; Caucasian Sheepdog; Russian: Кавказская овчарка; Kavkazskaya ovcharka
- Origin: Caucasus
Traits
| Height | Males | preferred 72–75 cm (28–30 in) minimum 68 cm (27 in) |
| | Females | preferred 67–70 cm (26–28 in) minimum 64 cm (25 in) |
| Weight | Males | minimum 50 kg (110 lb) |
| | Females | minimum 45 kg (100 lb) |
- Coat: straight, coarse, stand-off coat with well-developed undercoat
- Colour: any solid colour, piebald or spotted colour, except liver, blue, and solid black
Kennel club standards
- Fédération Cynologique Internationale: standard

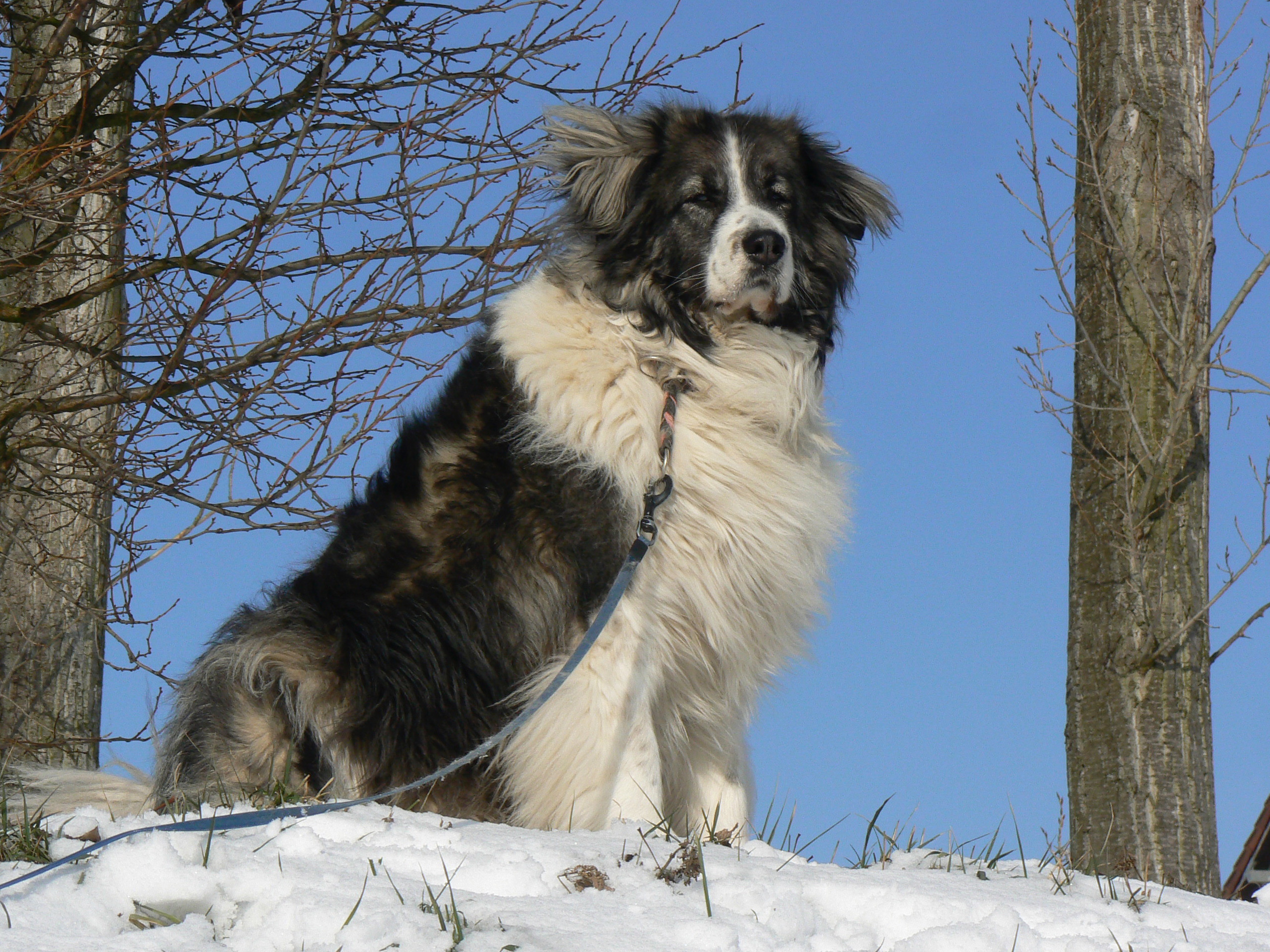

The Caucasian Shepherd Dog or Caucasian Ovcharka is a large livestock guardian dog native to the Caucasus region, particularly Georgia, Armenia, Azerbaijan, and Dagestan. It was bred in the Soviet Union from about 1920 from dogs of the Caucasus Mountains and the steppe regions of Southern Russia. The Caucasus Mountains in Georgia has historically been the principal region of distribution of Caucasian Shepherd dogs, both in terms of numbers and the quality of the dogs present in the area.

== History ==
For centuries dogs similar to the Caucasian mountain dogs have served shepherds in the Caucasus Mountains as livestock guardian dogs, defending sheep from predators, mainly wolves and human sheep-thieves. These dogs are distributed over a wide area, and there are considerable regional variations: those in Azerbaijan are fairly tall and lightly built; those in Dagestan are smaller and roughly square in outline; those of the former Checheno-Ingush ASSR, now Ingushetia and Chechnya, are heavily built and very large. It is widely accepted that those of Georgia are better and more uniform than those of other regions.

During the twentieth century Soviet breeders selected some of these varieties among Caucasian dogs and created the Caucasian Shepherd Dog breed. Caucasian shepherds were first scientifically described by the Russian cynologist Aleksandr Mazover, noting that the center of distribution of the breed, both in terms of numbers and quality, were Georgia, Azerbaijan, Armenia and Dagestan. While the dogs from different areas of the region shared the general features today present in Caucasian shepherds, Caucasian Shepherds from Georgia were considered to be the best examples of the breed due to their size, powerful musculoskeletal structure, and attractive long fur. For this reason, the Georgian SSR became the principal region for cultivating Caucasian Shepherd dogs in the Soviet Union.

The breed was definitively accepted by the Fédération Cynologique Internationale in 1984, under the patronage of the Soviet Union.

== Characteristics ==
The Caucasian Ovcharka is a large dog, usually weighing 45–70 kg (99–154 lb). The preferred height at the withers is in the range 67–70 cm (26–28 in) for bitches, and 72–75 cm (28–30 in) for dogs; the minimum heights and weights for registration are 64 cm (25 in) and 40 kg (88 lb) for bitches, and 68 cm (27 in) and 50 kg (110 lb) for dogs. Life expectancy was reported in 2020 at 10–11 years; a study published in 2024 found the median lifespan to be 5.4 years, the lowest in all breeds studied; however, the sample size was just 22 dogs.

In appearance, it closely resembles the Kars dog.

== Use ==
Caucasian Shepherd Dogs used to serve as guard dogs and bear hunting dogs and today they work as prison guard dogs in Russia.

== Restrictions ==
The breed is banned in Denmark and subject to restrictions in Russia.
