= Akbash =

Turkish breed of dog

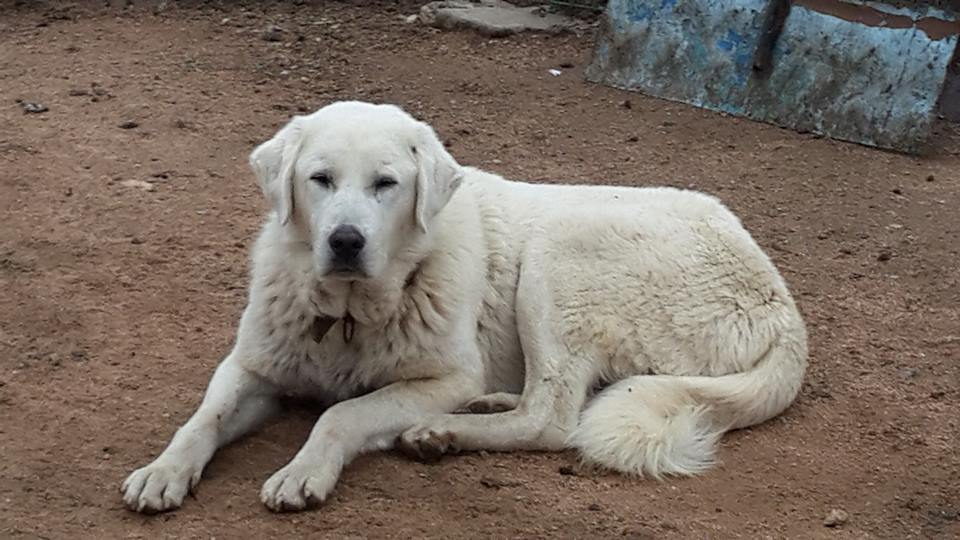
- Other names: Akbaş Çoban Köpeği
- Origin: Turkey
Traits
Height	Males	60–85 cm (24–33 in)
	Females	50–75 cm (20–30 in)
Weight	Males	45–65 kg (100–140 lb)
	Females	35–55 kg (80–120 lb)
- Coat: double coat
- Colour: white
- Notes: recognised by the Ministry of Agriculture and Rural Affairs of Turkey

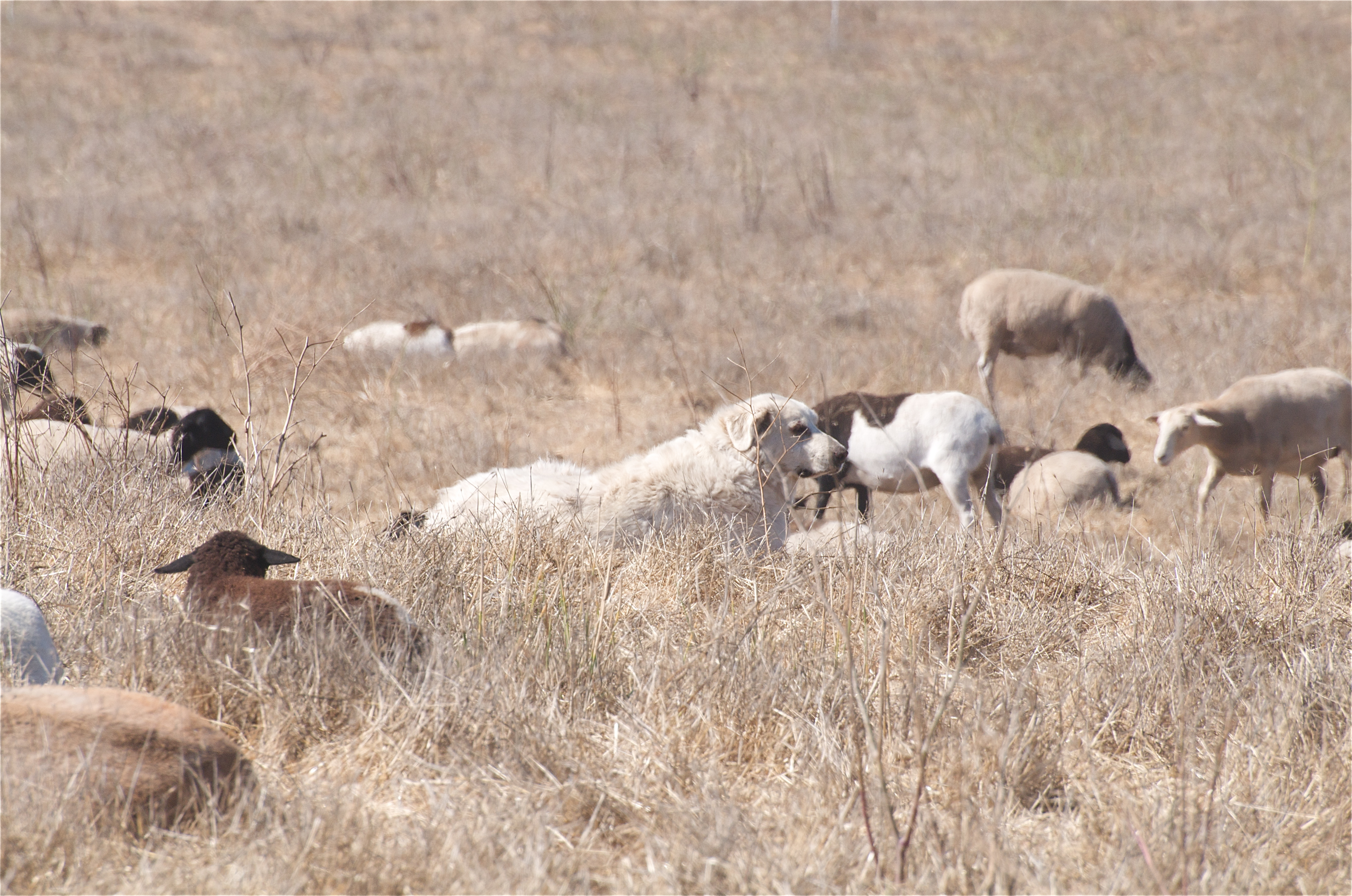
Guarding sheep in California

The Akbash (Turkish: Akbaş) is a traditional Turkish breed or type of flock guardian dog from western Anatolia. The word akbaş means 'white head' in Turkish and thus distinguishes this dog from the Karabaş, or 'black head'. It was recognised by the Turkish Ministry of Agriculture and Rural Affairs in 2006; it is under the tutelage of the Köpek Irkları ve Kinoloji Federasyonu, the Turkish dog breed society, but is not recognised by the Fédération Cynologique Internationale.

== History ==
The Akbash is a traditional breed of livestock guardian dog, used to protect flocks from predators in the rugged terrain of western Anatolia. It is distributed mainly in the provinces of Afyon, Ankara, Eskişehir and Manisa; some are present in the provinces of Ağrı, Konya, Sivas and Tunceli.

A standard was published by the Turkish Standards Institution in 2002, and in 2006 the Akbash was recognised by the Ministry of Agriculture and Rural Affairs; it was added to the list of recognised native breeds and types, and the breed standard was published in the Resmi Gazete, the official government gazette.

== Characteristics ==
The Akbash is a flock guardian dog, providing protection from predators to shepherds and to their sheep; it does not have any herding ability. It is a large and powerful dog: mean body weight is approximately 45 kg (100 lb), and mean height at the withers just over 75 cm (30 in).

The coat may be either long or of medium length; it is always double, and is usually white, though there may be some shading towards a biscuit colour. As with other white-coated flock guardian dogs, the white coat makes it easy for the shepherd to distinguish between the dog and a predator, even in the dark. There is considerable feathering behind the legs, and the tail is heavily feathered.
