= Kangal Shepherd Dog =

Turkish breed of dog

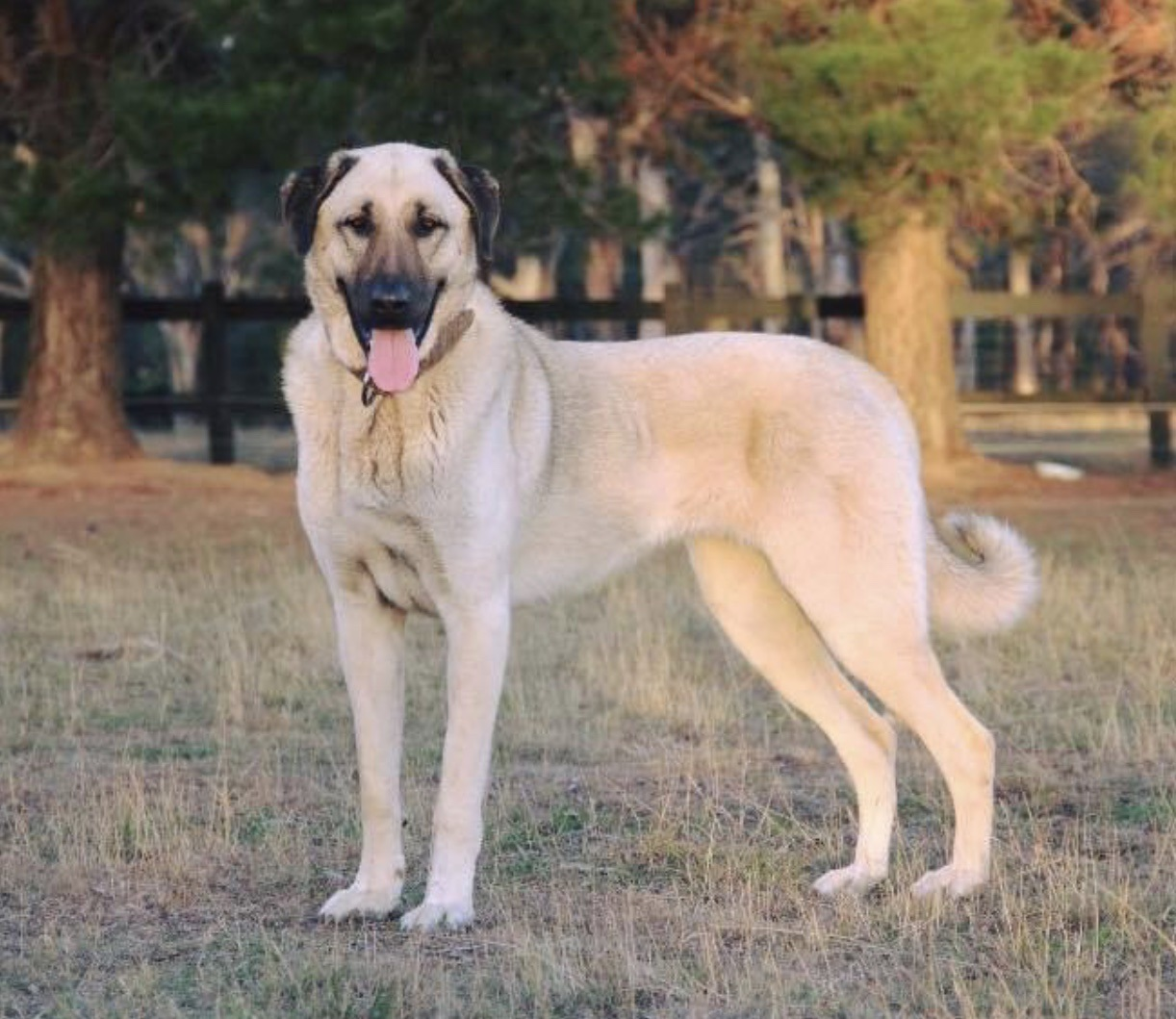
- Other names: Kangal Shepherd Dog; Kangal Çoban Köpeği; Karabash; Turkish Kangal Dog; Anatolian Shepherd Dog (disputed)
- Origin: Turkey
Traits
Height	Males	70–80 cm (28–31 in)
	Females	63–75 cm (25–30 in)
Weight	Males	48–60 kg (105–130 lb)
	Females	40–50 kg (90–110 lb)
- Coat: thick, dense, usually short double coat, 3–7 cm (1–3 in) long
- Colour: fawn to wolf sable, with black mask
Kennel club standards
- Köpek Irkları ve Kinoloji Federasyonu: standard
- Fédération Cynologique Internationale: standard

The Kangal Shepherd Dog or Turkish Kangal (Turkish: Kangal Çoban Köpeği) is a traditional Turkish breed of large livestock guardian dog. The breed name derives from that of the town and district of Kangal in Sivas Province, the easternmost province of the Central Anatolia Region in central Turkey. The coat colour varies from pale fawn to wolf grey, always with a black mask.

It is a traditional flock guardian dog, kept with flocks of sheep to fend off wolves and other predators. Some have been exported to African countries such as Namibia, Kenya and Tanzania, where they successfully protect local flocks from cheetahs, thus contributing to the conservation of endangered cheetah populations.

== Origin ==
The word Kangal is of Turkic origin, sharing same etymological roots with Kangly tribe, the ethnonym has been linked to the Turkic word kang, meaning wagon or cart. The Kangal dog is originated in Central Asia and brought by Turkish tribes with conquests. Kangal is also not the original name of the breed. This name came into use after discussions at United Kingdom's Kennel Club in the 1970s. Original name of the breed is Karabash, meaning "blackhead" in Turkish and derives from the black muzzle. See Akbash dog (meaning "whitehead").

== History ==
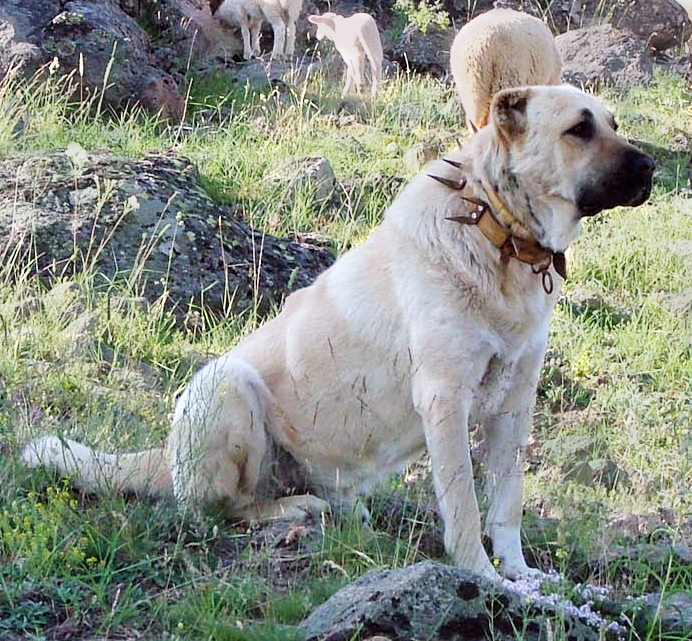
Wearing a spiked wolf collar

The Kangal is a traditional working breed of Central Anatolia. The name derives from that of the town and district of Kangal in Sivas Province, the easternmost province of the Central Anatolia Region. It has been used by shepherds for protection against wolves and other predators for centuries.

It was definitively accepted by the Fédération Cynologique Internationale in 1989; the most recent breed standard was published in 2018.

The Kennel Club of the United Kingdom recognised the Turkish Kangal Dog with effect from April 2013, and a provisional breed standard was published early in that year; owners of dogs registered as Anatolian Shepherd Dogs could apply for them to be re-registered under the new name.

Since 1994 around 300 Kangal dogs have been given to farmers in Namibia by the Cheetah Conservation Fund to help protect livestock from cheetah attacks, and that programme has been extended to Kenya. Since then, the number of cheetahs killed by farmers is calculated to have fallen from 19 annually, per farmer, to 2.4. At more than 80% of the farms where the dogs have been adopted livestock losses have been cut significantly. The great majority of cheetahs that are still killed by farmers are killed after specific attacks on livestock, whereas previously, any cat that approached a farm was tracked and killed.

=== Anatolian Shepherd ===
Anatolian Shepherd Dog is the name used in the United States to describe dogs descended from regional Turkish livestock guardian dogs, particularly the Kangal but also the Akbash, from the late 1960s. In 1967 a US Navy Lieutenant who was stationed in Turkey, Robert Ballard, acquired two working livestock guardians Zorba and Peki, from breeders in the Ankara region; Zorba was a long-coated pinto-colored dog and Peki a short-coated buff-colored bitch. In the late 1960s Ballard returned to the United States and took his dogs with him and in 1970 the pair bred their first litter, becoming the foundation stock of the breed in the United States. A breed club was quickly formed and further examples were imported from Turkey. In developing the breed, the American enthusiasts acted without understanding of regional Turkish varieties of shepherd's dogs, with the result that the American dogs could be bred with various coat lengths, colors and color patterns whilst in Turkey the different breeds breed more true to a set coat type. This was further exacerbated by most of these dogs being sourced in the intermediate zone between the main breeding centers of the Akbash and the Kangal, where examples of both types can be found. In subsequent years animosity developed between American breeders, who insisted their dogs were the true Turkish shepherd's dog, and Turkish breeders who believed, and stated, they were an amalgam of various Turkish breeds. Insults and counter-insults were exchanged with American breeders accusing the Turks of marketing dogs of dubious ancestry as independent breeds and the Turks stating the Americans were breeding crossbred dogs. The name Anatolian Shepherd Dog is unknown in Turkey and the breed is sometimes described as having the Turkish name of Çoban Köpeği which means 'shepherd's dog', or livestock guardian dog. Since the 1980s Americans have almost exclusively imported Kangals and the Anatolian has increasingly conformed to that breed type. Despite this, pups of mixed appearance are still whelped and Turkish authorities still refuse to recognise Anatolians as a purebred Turkish breed.

== Characteristics ==
Dogs usually stand between 72 and 78 cm at the withers, bitches between 65 and 73 cm, with a tolerance of 2 cm either way for both sexes. Body weights are usually in the range 40–50 kg for bitches and 48–60 kg for dogs.

The dogs have a moderately short double-coat, with a dense under-layer and a waterproof outer layer.

== Use ==
The Kangal is a traditional flock guardian dog, kept with flocks of sheep to fend off wolves and other predators. Some have been exported to African countries such as Namibia, Kenya and Tanzania, where they successfully protect local flocks from cheetahs, thus contributing to the conservation of endangered cheetah populations.

== Gallery ==
With cropped ears

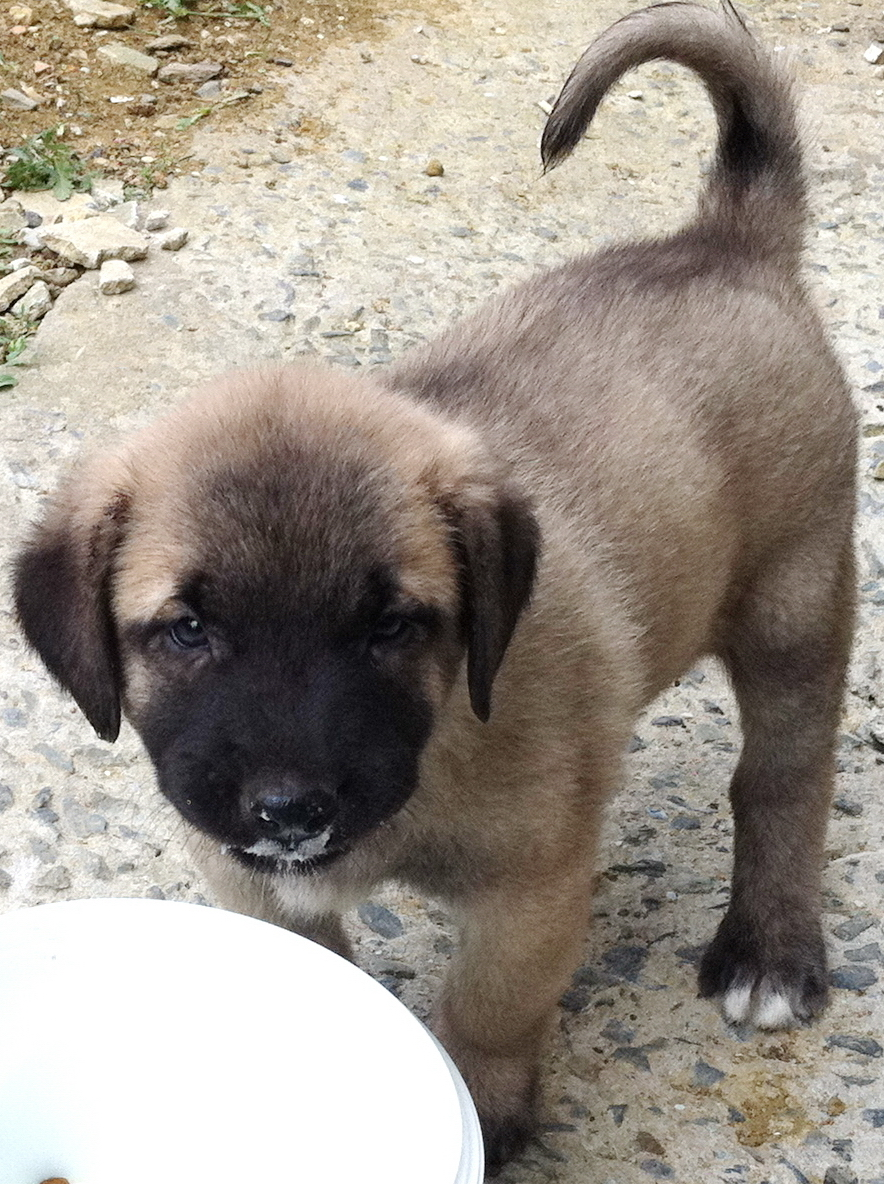
Kangal puppy eating yogurt

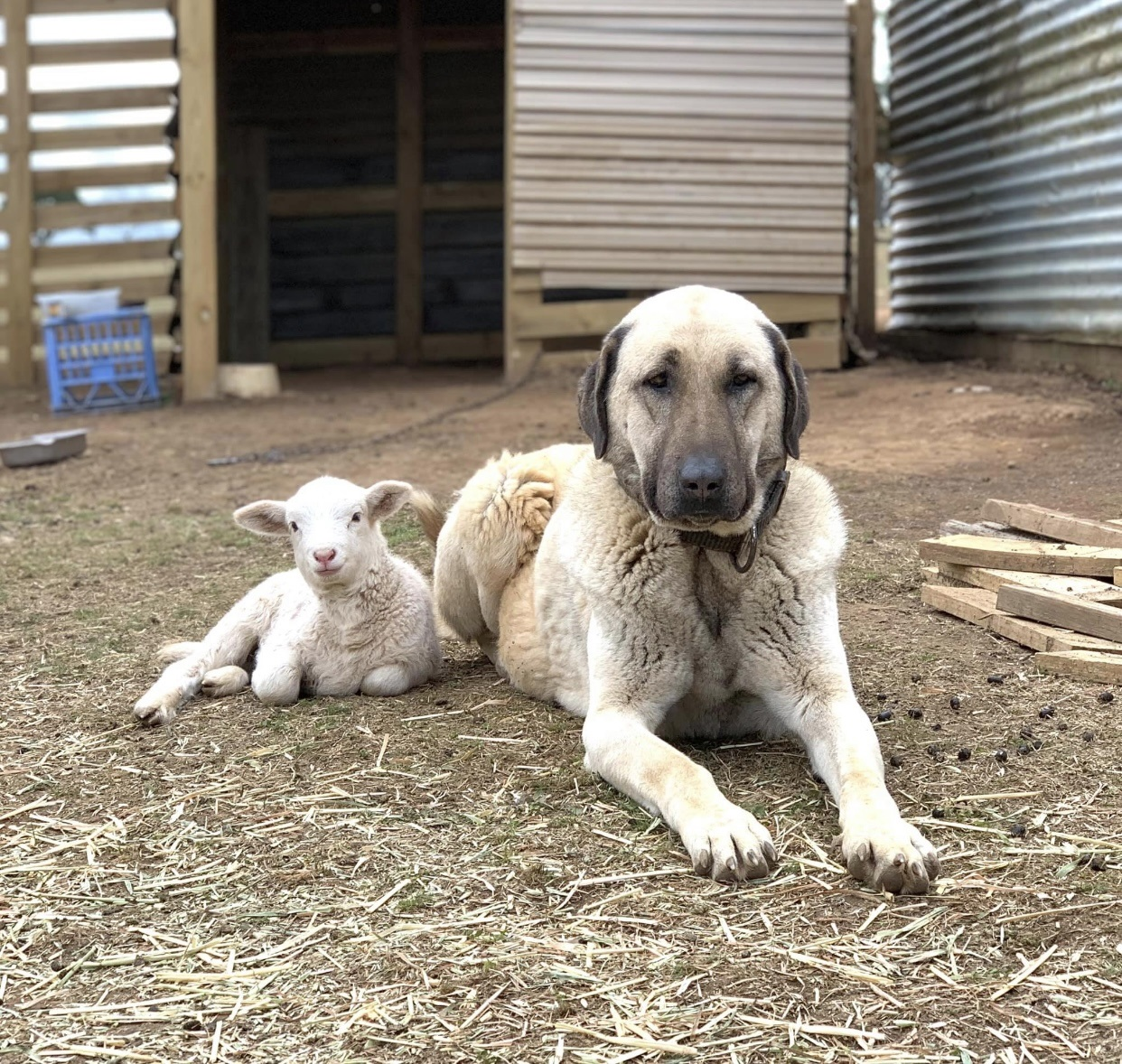
Flock guardian
