= Breed-specific legislation =

Legislation restricting certain breeds of dog

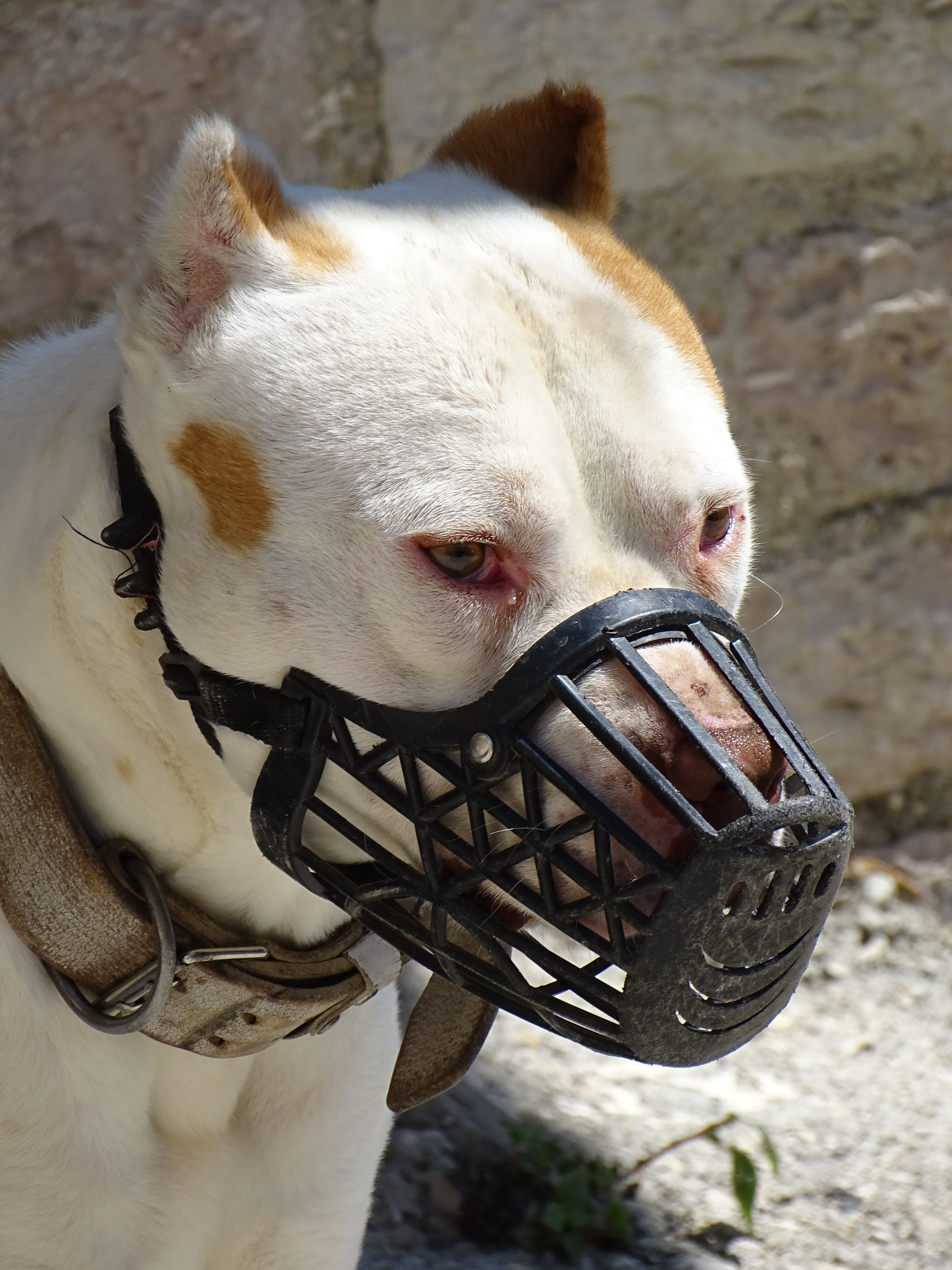
Pit bull–type dog wearing a muzzle

In law, breed-specific legislation (BSL) is a type of law that prohibits or restricts particular breeds or types of dog. Such laws range from outright bans on the possession of these dogs, to restrictions and conditions on ownership, and often establishes a legal presumption that such dogs are dangerous or vicious to prevent dog attacks. Some jurisdictions have enacted breed-specific legislation in response to a number of fatalities or maulings involving pit bull–type dogs or other dog breeds commonly used in dog fighting, and some government organizations such as the United States Army and Marine Corps have taken administrative action as well. Due to opposition to such laws in the United States, anti-BSL laws have been passed in 21 of the 50 state-level governments, prohibiting or restricting the ability of jurisdictions within those states to enact or enforce breed-specific legislation.

== Background ==
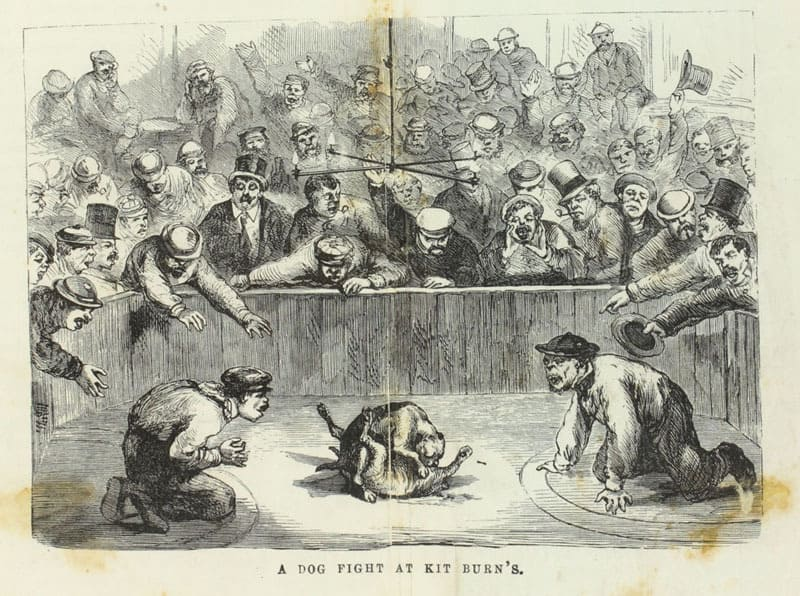
Pit bulls were often bred and trained to be aggressive for use in dog fighting

It is generally settled in case law that jurisdictions in the United States and Canada have the legal authority to enact breed-specific legislation. The effectiveness of such legislation in preventing dog bite fatalities and injuries remains controversial. Advocates such as the Animal Legal Defense Fund and the National Canine Research Council argue that breed-specific laws are ineffective and discriminatory, while some trauma surgeons and public health researchers contend that such laws may reduce the frequency and severity of serious attacks. One point of view is that certain dog breeds are a public safety issue that merits actions such as banning ownership, mandatory spaying/neutering for all dogs of these breeds, mandatory microchip implants and liability insurance, or prohibiting people convicted of a felony from owning them. Another point of view is that comprehensive "dog bite" legislation, coupled with better consumer education and legally mandating responsible pet keeping practices, is a better solution than breed-specific legislation to the problem of dangerous dogs.

A third point of view is that breed-specific legislation should not ban breeds entirely, but should strictly regulate the conditions under which specific breeds could be owned, e.g., forbidding certain classes of individuals from owning them, specifying public areas in which they would be prohibited, and establishing conditions, such as requiring a dog to wear a muzzle, for taking dogs from specific breeds into public places. Finally, some governments, such as that of Australia, have forbidden the import of specific breeds and require all existing dogs of these breeds to be spayed/neutered in an attempt to eliminate the population slowly through natural attrition.

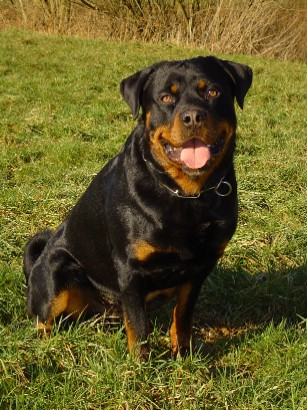
Originally bred as herding, guard, and working dogs, Rottweilers also became associated with dog fighting.

Approximately 550 jurisdictions in the United States have enacted breed-specific legislation in response to a number of well-publicized incidents involving pit bull–type dogs, and some government organizations such as the U.S. Army and Marine Corps have taken administrative action as well. These actions range from outright bans on the possession of pit bull–type dogs, to restrictions and conditions on pit bull ownership. They often establish a legal presumption that a pit bull–type dog is prima facie a legally "dangerous" or "vicious" dog. In response, 16 states in the U.S. prohibited or restricted the ability of municipal governments within those states to enact BSL, though these restrictions do not affect military installations located within the states.

=== Studies ===
A study by the US Centers for Disease Control and Prevention (CDC) in 2000 concluded that fatal attacks on humans appeared to be a breed-specific problem (pit bull–type dogs and Rottweilers accounted for half of all fatal dog attacks on humans between 1979 and 1998). However, they also concluded that fatal attacks represent a small proportion of dog bite injuries to humans and suggested that there may be better alternatives for prevention of dog bites than breed-specific ordinances. Given that many media sources reported that this study suggested that pit bull–type dogs and Rottweilers are disproportionately more dangerous than other dog breeds (Fatal dog attacks in USA & Canada 1982 – 2019), the American Veterinary Medical Association, whose journal published the original article, released a statement detailing that the study "cannot be used to infer any breed specific risk for dog bite fatalities" (for lack of sufficient data on total breed ownership).

A 2018 literature review determined that "injuries from Pitbull's and mixed breed dogs were both more frequent and more severe." In a 2019 study of patient records, among several breed categories, "pit bull terriers inflicted more complex wounds, were often unprovoked, and went off property to attack. Other top-biting breeds resulting in more unprovoked and complex wounds included German shepherds, Rottweilers, and huskies."

In a 2012 literature review, the American Veterinary Medical Association (AVMA) reported while some large breeds appear often in bite reports, certain breeds - notably large hounds and retrievers such as Labrador Retrievers and Golden Retrievers - are under-represented in bite statistics relative to their population size. The AVMA review emphasized that identifying the breed involved in a bite incident is often unreliable. It noted that visual breed identification can be inaccurate and that witnesses may be predisposed to assume that a dog involved in a severe attack is a pit bull-type dog. The term “pit bull” itself encompasses a range of pedigree breeds, mixed breeds, and informal classifications, further complicating breed-based comparisons. It further stated that if breed-focused prevention strategies were considered, a cluster of large breeds - including German Shepherds and shepherd crosses - would be implicated, with variation by geographic location.

In 2012, the American Bar Association passed a resolution urging the repeal of breed-specific legislation, stating that it is "ineffective at improving public safety". In 2008, the Dutch government repealed a 15 year ban on pit bulls, concluding the law was ineffective.

A 2017 survey in Ireland collected 140 responses from people who had experienced dog bites by large dogs. The study found that no significant difference existed between legislated and non-legislated dog breeds for the type of bite inflicted, and the medical treatment needed after the bite. The authors found that non-legislated dog breeds were less likely to be reported to the authorities both before and after the bite compared to legislated dog breeds. The authors argue that breed specific legislation may distort perception of harm, and suggest both owners and dogs targeted by the legislation may experience harmful treatment by the public.

== Legislation ==
Fifty-two countries have some form of breed-specific legislation, and 41 of those have BSL at the national level, as of December 2018.

=== North America ===
==== Bermuda ====
In Bermuda, since July 21, 2003, importing or breeding of any "breed of dog that may be perceived as dangerous" is prohibited. Prohibited breeds include: American Pit Bull Terrier, American Bulldog, American Staffordshire Terrier, Dogo Argentino, Boerboel, Fila Brasiliero, Cane Corso, Presa Canario, Neapolitan Mastiff, Tosa Inu, Wolf or Wolf hybrid, and crossbreeds thereof, as well as "any exotic or uncommon breed" at the government's discretion.

Another category, restricted breeds, may be imported/kept once the conditions for keeping these dogs have been fulfilled, new acquisitions require pre-approval, and they may be bred only with a Breeder's permit. Restricted breeds include: Akita, Australian Cattle Dog, Belgian Malinois, Bouvier Des Flandres, Bull Terrier, Bullmastiff, Chow Chow, Doberman Pinscher, Dogue De Bordeaux, German Shepherd, English Mastiff, Rhodesian Ridgeback, Rottweiler, Staffordshire Bull Terrier, and any cross of these.

==== Canada ====
The Canadian federal government does not regulate pit bull–type dogs, but two provincial governments and some municipal governments in Canada have enacted breed-specific legislation banning or restricting pit bull–type dogs. The following table discusses a sampling of the restrictions in force.

Province	Locality	Date	Type	Details
Manitoba	Winnipeg	July 17, 2013 (amended 2014)	Ban	Dogs having the appearance and physical characteristics predominantly conforming to the standards of the Canadian Kennel Club or the United Kennel Club of: 1. American Pit Bull Terrier; 2. Staffordshire Bull Terrier; 3. American Staffordshire Terrier
Ontario	All	August 29, 2005	Ban	No person shall own, breed, transfer, abandon or import a pit bull, nor allow one to stray, nor train a pit bull for fighting. "Pit bull" includes a pit bull terrier, a Staffordshire bull terrier, an American Staffordshire terrier, an American pit bull terrier, or a dog that has an appearance and physical characteristics that are substantially similar to those. Pit bulls were grandfathered (called "restricted pit bulls") if they were owned by an Ontario resident on August 29, 2005, or born in Ontario within 90 days afterwards. Such dogs are subject to restrictions: they must be muzzled and kept on a leash no more than 1.8 meters long when in public or not on enclosed property, and they must be spayed or neutered unless a veterinarian certifies the dog is physically unfit to be anesthetized. If it is alleged in a proceeding that a dog is a pit bull, the onus of proving that the dog is not a pit bull lies on the owner of the dog. In the absence of evidence to the contrary, a veterinarian's certificate attesting that a dog is a pit bull is evidence of that fact.

==== United States ====
As of 2018, there was some level of breed-specific legislation in 37 states and over 1,000 cities. Though the federal government of the United States has not enacted breed-specific legislation, four of the five branches of the United States Armed Forces have restricted certain breeds at almost 300 installations (mostly with respect to on-base housing and privatized housing). Over 20 American Indian reservations have also enacted BSL.

The following 17 states prohibit their municipalities from passing breed-specific laws: Colorado, Connecticut, Florida, Illinois, Maine, Massachusetts, Minnesota, Nevada, New Jersey, New York, Oklahoma, Pennsylvania, Rhode Island, South Dakota, Texas, Utah, and Virginia. California prohibits most breed-specific laws, but allows breed-specific spay/neuter.

As of 2021, there were only nine states that prohibited local governments from implementing or enforcing breed-specific legislation. They include: Arizona, Connecticut, Delaware, Illinois, Maine, Rhode Island, South Dakota, Utah, Washington DC

Below are summaries of some of the breed-specific legislation enacted in the United States. This is not an all-inclusive list of BSL throughout the USA.

State	Locality	Date	Type	Details
Colorado	Denver	July 31, 1989 suspended from April 21, 2004 to May 8, 2005	Restriction	Previous ban repealed in 2020 by popular vote. Pit bulls subject to "breed-restricted permit".
Florida	Miami-Dade County	1989	Restriction	Previous ban repealed by state legislation eliminating grandfather clause since 2023, contrary to popular vote. "It was illegal in Miami-Dade County to own any dog which substantially conforms to a Pit Bull breed dog, unless it was specially registered with Miami-Dade County prior to 1989. Acquisition or keeping of a Pit Bull dog: $500.00 fine and County Court action to force the removal of the animal from Miami-Dade County. The ban had previously been preserved after 63% of voters chose to uphold it in the 2012 election."
Iowa	Council Bluffs	2004	Ban	Pit bulls prohibited in city limits. "Any dog that is an American Pit Bull Terrier, American Staffordshire Terrier, Staffordshire Bull Terrier, or any dog displaying the majority of physical traits of any one or more of the above breeds (more so than any other breed), or any dog exhibiting those distinguishing characteristics which substantially conform to the standards established by the American Kennel Club or United Kennel Club for any of the above breeds." Owners may keep pit bulls they had when the ordinance was passed, but they must be muzzled or in a secure temporary enclosure when off property.
Kentucky	Union County	2008	Restriction	Pit bulls are considered vicious dogs and must be registered annually with the county for $50, listing identifying information, proof of rabies shots, proof of neutered status, and proof of $100,000 in liability insurance to cover injuries, death, or property damage caused by a pit bull.
Maryland	Prince George's County	1997	Restriction	Previous ban repealed by popular vote since 2025. Pit Bull Terriers were prohibited within the county. A Pit Bull Terrier may temporary be in the county for a contest or show, with permissions and assurances of protective measures to prevent escape or injuring the public, and must be transported in a secure temporary enclosure. Dogs employed by the county or licensed security services and trained to perform official police, correctional, security, fire and/or search and rescue service are permitted. Pit Bull Terrier means Staffordshire Bull Terrier, American Staffordshire Terrier, American Pit Bull Terrier, dogs having the appearance of being predominantly of the three breeds of dog, and dogs having been registered at any time as a Pit Bull Terrier. (Sec. 3-101(a)(62))
Michigan	Melvindale	1990	Ban	Bans possession of pit bulls (purebred or hybrid) which substantially conforms to the AKC breed standards for American Staffordshire Terriers or Staffordshire Bull Terriers or the UKC breed standards for American Pit Bull Terriers.
Missouri	Independence	2006	Restriction	Previous ban repealed by popular vote since 2023. Pit bulls were prohibited in the city except for those registered before the ordinance (2006). Owners of pit bulls in the city prior to the ordinance must license their dog(s) annually, show proof of neutering, rabies vaccination, and $300,000 liability insurance. The dog must be confined at all times and signage placed on the property. Dogs off property must be on a short leash handled by a competent adult and muzzled with a steel cage type muzzle, or in a secure temporary enclosure. Pit bulls may temporarily visit the city for competitions and exhibits with permissions and precautions. A pit bull is considered an American Pit Bull Terrier, American Staffordshire Terrier, Staffordshire Bull Terrier, or any dog displaying the majority of physical traits of the three breeds, or any dog exhibiting those distinguishing characteristics which substantially conform to those breeds standards of the AKC or UKC.
Missouri	Kearney	2007	Restriction	Previous ban repealed by popular vote since 2024. Pit bull ownership was prohibited in the city. Dogs already residing in the city prior to the ordinance date in 2007 may remain but are restricted: confined, leashed, muzzled, signage on property, owner to carry public liability insurance of $300,000, and any offspring must be removed from city. A pit bull is considered "any dog which has the appearance and characteristics of being predominantly of the breeds of bull terrier, Staffordshire bull terrier, American pit bull terrier, American Staffordshire terrier; any other breed commonly known as pit bulls, pit bull dogs or pit bull terriers or a combination of any of these breeds."
Missouri	Springfield	2006	Restriction	Previous ban repealed by popular vote since 2018. Restrictions: Register your pit bull or pit mix annually. Keep pit bull or pit mix safe at all times. Post a sign on your property. Keep the dog in a secured, six-sided enclosure while on your property. Keep your pit bull or pit mix leashed and muzzled while not on your property. Notify Animal Control within 5 days if the pit bull is lost, stolen, dies or has puppies.
Tennessee	Sparta	2005	Ban	Pit bulls prohibited in the city, meaning bull terrier, Staffordshire bull terrier, American pit bull terrier, American Staffordshire terrier, dogs of mixed breed which includes these breeds, any dog known as a pit bull, pit bull dog or pit bull terrier, any dog having the appearance and characteristics of being predominantly of those breeds, any dog registered within the city as a pit bull dog. Exceptions: Dogs owned prior to the ordinance (August 2005) must be registered, leashed and muzzled, confined, signage posted, public liability insurance of $50,000, identifying photos, reporting requirements, offspring removed from city.
Utah		1997	Ban	As of 2014, Utah law prohibits local governments (cities and counties) from enacting or enforcing breed-specific legislation (BSL). Under Utah Code, localities cannot pass ordinances targeting specific dog breeds, such as pit bulls, focusing instead on breed-neutral dangerous dog regulations.
Virginia		1993	Ban	Virginia adopted a state preemption law against local breed-specific legislation (BSL) in 1993, which prohibits local governments from enacting ordinances that declare a dog dangerous solely based on its breed. This means that while localities can have dangerous dog laws, they cannot specifically target breeds like pit bulls.
Washington	Enumclaw	1990	Restriction	Pit Bull Terrier dogs prohibited, meaning any Bull Terrier, American Pit Bull Terrier, Staffordshire Bull Terrier or American Staffordshire Terrier, or any mixed breed of dog which contains any of these breeds, or a dog identifiable as partially of these breeds. Exceptions: Dogs in town for a show or competition, with permission and safety precautions; a service or assistance animal that performs tasks for its handler; a dog that has passed the AKC Kennel Club Canine Good Citizen Test or a reasonable equivalent.
Washington	Royal City	January 12, 2007	Ban	Section 6.04.020: A "dangerous dog" also includes: 1. Any dog known by the owner to be a Pit Bull Terrier, which shall be defined as any American Pit Bull Terrier, Staffordshire Bull Terrier, American Bulldog or American Staffordshire Terrier breed of dog or any mixed breed of dog which contains as an element of its breeding the breed of American Pit Bull Terrier, Staffordshire Bull Terrier, American Bulldog or American Staffordshire Terrier as to be identifiable as partially of such breeds (hereafter a "pit bull dog").; 2. Any dog known by the owner to be a Rottweiler breed of dog or any mixed breed of dog which contains as an element of its breeding the breed of Rottweiler as to be identifiable as partially of such breeds (hereafter a "Rottweiler dog").; No one shall keep, possess or harbor a dangerous dog, as defined by Section 6.04.020 within the city.
West Virginia	Wheeling	2006	Restriction	Three types of dog are designated as vicious: American Bulldog or old country bulldog, canary dog or Perro de Presa Canario, and Pit Bull Terrier (Staffordshire bull terrier, American pit bull terrier, or American Staffordshire terrier). This includes mix breeds of any of these. Proof of pedigree excluding these breeds will exempt a dog. Vicious-designated dogs must be neutered, confined, leashed and muzzled off property, be permitted annually, and wear a tag. Owners must place signage and obtain liability insurance of $100,000.

=== Central and South America ===
Nation	Locality	Date	Type	Details
Brazil	State of Rio de Janeiro and nationwide.	April 9, 1999 and April 24, 2004	Banned for unauthorized commercialization, unauthorized breeding and unauthorized creation. In Rio de Janeiro, all breeding, importation and commercialization is also restricted.	Pit bulls in general and breeds derived from them in Rio de Janeiro. Brazilian Mastiff, Dogo Argentino, Pit Bull Terrier, Rottweiller, Staffordshire Terrier, Staffordshire Bull Terrier, Tosa Inu as well in federal law. In Rio de Janeiro: Article 1 – It is prohibited throughout the State of Rio de Janeiro the import, the marketing and the breeding of dogs of the pitt-bull [sic] breed as well as breeds resulting from the crossbreeding with the pitt-bull, in kennels or in isolation.; Article 2 – It is mandatory from 06 (six) months of age, the sterilization of all pitbull dogs, or derived therefrom, in the State of Rio de Janeiro.; Article 3 – It will only be allowed to keep animals of the pitt-bull breed, or derived therefrom, upon proof of sterilization and updated vaccination.
Ecuador		March 2009	Banned	Private ownership of pit bull–type dogs and Rottweilers is prohibited.
Trinidad and Tobago			Banned	
Venezuela		2014	Banned	It will be illegal to import, breed, adopt, raise, or sell pit bull–type dogs starting December 31, 2014.

=== Europe ===
==== Ireland ====
The Control of Dogs Regulations, 1998 place controls on 12 breeds of dogs: American Pit Bull Terrier, English Bull Terrier, Staffordshire Bull Terrier, Dogo Argentino, Bull Mastiff, Doberman Pinscher, German Shepherd (Alsatian), Rhodesian Ridgeback, Rottweiler, Japanese Akita, Japanese Tosa, and Bandog. These dogs, or strains and crosses thereof, must be kept on a strong, short lead (less than 2 metres / 6′ 7″) by a person over 16 years of age who is capable of controlling them. The dogs must be securely muzzled and wear a collar with the name and address of the owner.

==== United Kingdom ====
In the United Kingdom the main piece of breed-specific legislation is the Dangerous Dogs Act 1991, which makes it illegal to own any 'Specially Controlled Dogs' without specific exemption from a court. The dogs have to be muzzled and kept on a lead in public, they must be registered and insured, neutered, tattooed and receive microchip implants. The Act also bans the breeding, sale and exchange of these dogs, even if they are on the 'Index of Exempted Dogs'.

Two types of dogs are specifically identified by the Act:

- Pit Bull Terrier
- Japanese Tosa

In addition, the Dangerous Dogs (Designated Types) Order 1991, a statutory instrument made under this Act, designated two more types as "appearing to be bred for fighting or to have the characteristics of types bred for that purpose":

- Dogo Argentino
- Fila Brasileiro

The "Dangerous Dogs (Designated Types) (England and Wales) Order 2023” and "The Dangerous Dogs (Designated Types) Order (Northern Ireland) 2024", as well as "The Dangerous Dogs (Designated Types) (Scotland) Order 2024" designated one more type as "appearing to be bred for fighting or to have the characteristics of a type bred for that purpose":

- American Bully XL, also referred to as XL Bully

The Act also covers cross-breeds of the above five types of dog. Dangerous dogs are classified by "type", not by breed label. This means that whether a dog is prohibited under the Act will depend on a judgement about its physical characteristics, and whether they match the description of a prohibited "type". This assessment of the physical characteristics is made by a court.

The Act applies in England, Wales and Scotland, with the Dangerous Dogs (Northern Ireland) Orders of 1991 and 2024 having a similar effect in Northern Ireland.

==== Other European countries ====
Nation	Locality	Date	Type	Details
Austria	Vienna, Lower Austria, Upper Austria, Vorarlberg		Restricted	Four out of nine federal states have restrictions and requirements for certain dog types and breeds. Vienna: Bull Terrier; Staffordshire Bull Terrier; American Staffordshire Terrier; Mastino Napoletano (Neapolitan Mastiff); Mastin Espanol (Spanish Mastiff); Fila Brasileiro; Mastiff; Bullmastiff; Tosa Inu; Pit Bull Terrier; Rottweiler; Dogo Argentino (Argentinian Mastiff), crosses of those breeds and dog types; Lower Austria: Bull Terrier; American Staffordshire Terrier; Staffordshire Bull Terrier; Dogo Argentino; Pit Bull Terrier; Bandog; Rottweiler; Tosa Inu; crosses of those breeds and dog types; Upper Austria: American Pit Bull Terrier; American Staffordshire Terrier; Bull Terrier; Dogo Argentino; Staffordshire Bull Terrier; Tosa Inu; crosses of those breeds; All dogs heavier than 20 kg and greater than 40 cm height of withers; Vorarlberg: Bull Terrier; Staffordshire Bull Terrier; American Staffordshire Terrier; Neapolitan Mastiff (Mastino Napoletano); Spanish Mastiff (Mastin Espanol); Fila Brasileiro; Argentinian Mastiff; Mastiff; Bullmastiff; Tosa Inu; French Mastiff (Dogue de Bordeaux); Dogo Argentino; Ridgeback; crosses of Bandog and Pitbullterrier; crosses of those breeds and dog types
Cyprus			Banned	The entry of dogs of the following breeds is prohibited regardless of the country of origin: "Pit Bull Terriers" ("pitbulls" refers to a small group of closely related breeds, which include the American Pit Bull Terrier, Staffordshire Bull Terrier, American Staffordshire Terrier, and the English Bull Terrier; Tosa Inu or Japanese Tosa; Dogo Argentino or Argentinian Mastiff; Fila Brasileiro or Brazilian Mastiff
Denmark		July 1, 2010	Banned	As of July 1, 2010, breeding, selling and importing of the following breeds is banned: Japanese Tosa, Dogo Argentino, American Pit Bull Terrier, American Staffordshire Terrier, Fila Brasileiro, American Bulldog, Central Asian Shepherd Dog, Boerboel, Kangal, Caucasian Shepherd Dog, Tornjak, Šarplaninac, South Russian Shepherd Dog and crossbreeds thereof. Currently existing dogs must be muzzled and leashed at all times in public. Same restrictions against mutts if the owner cannot prove that their dog is not a crossbreed. A "positive list" is also mentioned, listing breeds that look similar to, and may be confused for the banned breeds: Polski Owczarek Podhalanski, Cão Fila de São Miguel, Dogue de Bordeaux, Bullmastiff, English Mastiff, Neapolitan Mastiff, Cane Corso, Staffordshire Bull Terrier, Dogo Canario, Anatolian Shepherd Dog, Iberian Dogge. Owners of these breeds must be able to provide documentation to prove that they do not own an illegal dog breed, but these breeds are not banned by law.
France		April 30, 1999	Restricted	Non-pure-breed animals resembling pit bulls are to be spay/neutered
Germany		February 2001	Restricted	Importation of the American Pit Bull Terrier, American Staffordshire Terrier, Staffordshire Bull Terrier, English Bull Terrier, Dogo Argentino, Tosa Inu and their crossbreeds, is prohibited. Eighteen (18) other dog breeds are regulated by individual federal states, including: Alano, American Bulldog, Bully Kutta (Pakistani Mastiff), Bullmastiff, Cane Corso (Italian Mastiff), Caucasian Shepherd Dog, Dobermann, Dogue de Bordeaux, Fila Brasiliero, Kangal Shepherd Dog (Karabash), Boerboel, Neapolitan Mastiff, Presa Canario (Canary Mastiff), Perro de Presa Mallorquin, Rottweiler, and Spanish Mastiff.
Iceland			Banned from importation	Some dangerous dog breeds and their crosses are prohibited from entering Iceland. They include: American Pit Bull Terrier, Staffordshire Bull Terrier, Tosa Inu, Dogo Argentino (Argentine Mastiff) and Fila Brasileiro (Brazilian Mastiff), and English Bull Terriers. Wolf mixes are not permitted. Other dogs which display aggressive or dangerous behavior may not be permitted entry.
Lithuania		October 3, 2012	Banned/Restricted	Under Lithuanian law only the American Pit Bull Terrier is considered a dog fighting breed which is banned. The same legislation also defines a list of dog breeds considered dangerous and restrictions on their import, ownership, breeding, sale, etc.: American Staffordshire Terrier; Staffordshire Bull Terrier; American Bulldog; Dogo Argentino; Fila Brasileiro; Kangal Shepherd Dog; Caucasian Shepherd; South Russian Shepherd
Norway		July 4, 1991, amended August 20, 2004	Banned	The following breeds are forbidden to give, sell, breed or import, including those in embryonic form, but dogs bred before the law came into effect are legal to possess: American Pit Bull Terrier; American Staffordshire Terrier; Dogo Argentino; Fila Brasileiro; Tosa Inu (incorrectly listed as "Toso"); Czechoslovakian Wolfdog and any wolf hybrid; Dogs of these breeds that are kept legal, also have to be microchipped.
Poland		1997	Restricted	Special act defines what is called "list of aggressive dog breeds", including: American Pit Bull Terrier; Perro de Presa Mallorquin; American Bulldog; Dogo Argentino; Perro de Presa Canario; Tosa Inu; Rottweiler; Akbash; Anatolian Karbash; Moscow Watchdog; Caucasian Shepherd Dog; Breeding or owning of these breeds requires a permit from local authorities. Permit is requested by breeder or owner. Permit can be withdrawn whenever the dog is kept in a way that it creates danger for people or other animals.
Portugal			Restricted Owners can have these breeds but they have to have them muzzled when outdoors, registered and sterilized. They also have to submit your own criminal record when they register the dog.	The restriction affects the American Pit Bull Terrier, American Staffordshire Terrier, Staffordshire Bull Terrier, Tosa Inu, Dogo Argentino, and Fila Brasileiro.
Romania		April 26, 2002	Restricted	The following restrictions apply: Owners of the following breeds of dogs must be adults (aged at least 18) with full legal capacity, and must not have been criminally convicted of an offence against the person, and must register the dogs under specific forms: category I dogs, which are also prohibited from being imported (although it is not illegal to own them), and must also be sterilized and consists of "fighting and attack dogs, assimilated by morphological characters to the type of dogs" Pit Bull, Boerbull, Bandog and their mixed breeds; category II dogs which consists of the breeds: American Staffordshire Terrier, Tosa, Rottweiller, Dogo Argentino, Neapolitan Mastiff, Fila Brasileiro, Mastiff, Caucasian Shepherd Dog, Cane Corso and their mixed breeds.; The law also sets other regulations and obligations for owners of dogs considered aggressive.
Spain		2002	Restricted	A royal decree restricts several breeds, including the American Pit Bull Terrier, American Staffordshire Terrier, Argentine Dogo, Bull Terrier, Staffordshire Bull Terrier, Tosa Inu, and Fila Brasileiro.
Switzerland		2012	Breed-specific legislation in Switzerland, May 2012. Red: Breed-specific legislation enacted, breeds on the list are banned. Yellow: BSL enacted, breeds on the list are subject to authorization. Red/yellow: BSL enacted, some of the breeds on the list are banned. Green: no BSL	Varies by canton; some cantons have adopted extensive BSL, others have no such legislation whatsoever. Several decisions of the Supreme Court have found that cantonal BSL is constitutional. There is no BSL on the federal level; federal bills that would have enacted it died in 2006 and 2010.
Ukraine			Restricted	There is "dangerous breed list" in Ukraine since 2002, which listed 88 breeds. On November 10, 2021, the Cabinet of Ministers of Ukraine updated the list of dangerous dog breeds, which included 52 breeds now. 23 January 2020 Lviv City Council has removed legislative reference to "dangerous breeds" that earlier listed over 80 breeds, including several varieties of Bull Terriers, Bulldogs, Livestock Guardian dogs, Boxer, Briard, Labrador Retriever, Welsh Terrier, German Shepherd and their mixes. Previous compliance requirements included mandatory insurance and micro chipping, walking on a short leash and muzzle in public places, other restrictions. In Ukraine capital, Kyiv, as per law adapted at 1998, the list of breeds forbidden for breeding and requiring mandatory sterilization, includes Dogo Argentino, Tosa Inu, American Pit Bull Terrier, Presa Canario, Kangal, Romanian Shepherd, Greek Shepherd, Alek Roshhin Doberman, Superdog and Superdog Mainkong mixes and 18 other recognized and unrecognized breeds. Besides mandatory spay, law requests muzzle, insurance, short leash, very high license fees and other measures. As per Ukrainian Kennel Club KSU, dangerous breeds list includes over 20 breeds, such as American Staffordshire Terrier, American Pit Bull Terrier, Dogo Argentino, Tosa Inu, Staffordshire Bull Terrier, Dogue De Bordeaux.

=== Asia ===
Nation	Locality	Date	Type	Details
Hong Kong		June 2000	Banned	The importation, breeding of fighting dogs, which are Pit Bull Terrier, Japanese Tosa, Dogo Argentino, Fila Brasiliero and any crossbreds involving fighting dogs mentioned before is prohibited. Keeping any fighting dogs that are not neutered are also prohibited.
India		March 13, 2024	Proposed	The Department of Animal Husbandry and Dairying, Government of India, recommended a ban on issuing licenses or permits for the sale and breeding of the following breeds: Pitbull Terrier, Tosa Inu, American Staffordshire Terrier, Fila Brasileiro, Dogo Argentino, American Bulldog, Boerboel, Kangal, Central Asian Shepherd Dog, Caucasian Shepherd Dog, South Russian Shepherd Dog, Tornjak, Sarplaninac, Japanese Tosa and Akita, Mastiffs, Rottweiler, Terriers, Rhodesian Ridgeback, Wolf Dogs, Canario, Akbash, Moscow Guard, Cane Corso. It was proposed in a response to the appeals to ban certain breeds due to attacks on humans and animal abuse relating to dog fighting and more.
Israel		2004	Banned for importation	Dogo Argentino, Pitbull Terriers, Bull Terriers, American Staffordshire Terriers, Staffordshire Bull Terriers, Rottweilers, Fila Brasileiro (Brazilian Mastiff) and Tosa Inu are banned for importation.
Malaysia		2002	Banned	The following breeds are banned in Malaysia: Akita, American Bulldog, American Pit Bull Terrier, Dogo Argentino, Fila Brasileiro, Japanese Tosa, Kai Ken, Ovcharka, Perro de Presa Mallorquin, Perro de Presa Canario, Russo-European Laika, or Tibetan Mastiff The following breeds are restricted in Malaysia: Alaskan Malamute, American Staffordshire Terrier, Belgian Shepherd, Dogue de Bordeaux, East-European Shepherd, Estrela Mountain Dog, German Shepherd, Miniature Bull Terrier, Neapolitan Mastiff, Rafeiro do Alentejo, Rottweiler, Staffordshire Bull Terrier
Singapore		June 4, 1991	Restricted	The following breeds of dogs and their crosses are not allowed to be imported into Singapore – Pit Bull (which includes the American Pit Bull Terrier also known as the American Pit Bull and Pit Bull Terrier, American Staffordshire Terrier, Staffordshire Bull Terrier, the American Bulldog, and crosses between them and with other breeds); Neapolitan Mastiff, Tosa, Akita, Dogo Argentino, Boerboel, Fila Brasileiro and their crosses. Owners of these breeds of dogs already in Singapore must comply with the following requirements: the dog shall be implanted with a microchip; the dog, if over 6 months of age, shall be sterilised; the licensee shall have in force a policy of insurance approved by the Director-General for an amount of not less than $100,000 to cover any injury to persons or animals or damage to property that might be caused by the dog; and; the licensee shall furnish to the Director-General security in the form of a banker's guarantee for $5,000, which shall be forfeited if —; the owner allows the dog to be in a public place otherwise than on a leash and securely fitted with a muzzle sufficient to prevent it from biting a person; or; the dog is reported lost.; The following dog breeds must be leashed and muzzled at all times when in public – Bull Terrier, Bull Mastiff, Doberman Pinscher, German Shepherd or any Shepherd related dog breeds, Rottweiler and Perro de Presa Canario.
Taiwan			Restrictions and import bans	The Council of Agriculture lists six types of dogs as aggressive breeds: pit bull terriers (includes American Pit Bull Terrier, Staffordshire Bull Terrier, American Staffordshire Terrier, and their mixes), Japanese Tosas, Neapolitan Mastiffs, Dogo Argentinos, Fila Brasileiro, and mastiffs. Such dogs must be registered, and when in public must be accompanied by an adult, muzzled, and kept on a short leash. In 2021, the Bureau of Foreign Trade added American Pit Bull Terriers and American Staffordshire Terriers to the list of animals prohibited from importation.
Turkey		2021	Banned	The breeding, owning, sheltering, feeding, exchanging, displaying, gifting, importing, selling and advertising of American Bully, American Pit Bull Terrier, American Staffordshire Terrier, Dogo Argentino, Fila Brasileiro, and Japanese Tosa dogs is banned. Owners must register and sterilize their dogs.
United Arab Emirates			Banned	The following breeds are banned from importation into the country: American Bully, American Pit Bull Terrier, American Staffordshire Terrier, Dogo Argentino, Doberman Pinscher, Fila Brasileiro, Rottweiler, Presa Canario, Staffordshire Bull Terrier, Tosa Inu and Wolfdogs of any breed. https://www.petraveller.com.au/blog/banned-dog-breeds-in-the-united-arab-emirates

=== Oceania ===
Nation	Locality	Date	Type	Details
Australia		2010-09-02	Banned for importation, breeding, sale, transfer of ownership.	Dogo Argentino; Fila Brasileiro; Japanese Tosa; American Pit Bull Terrier or Pit Bull Terrier; Perro de Presa Canario or Presa Canario; and advertising matter for these breeds. Breeding is restricted by State Laws. In New South Wales, Queensland and Victoria, restricted dogs must not be bred, sold or ownership transferred. they must also be desexed, wear a distinctive collar, reside in a certified enclosure and must be leashed and muzzled at all times when outside of its registered enclosure. Public signage declaring the dog resides on the property must be located at each entrance. Wolfdogs and associated breeds such as the Czechoslovakian Wolfdog and Saarloos Wolfdog, alongside wild x domestic cat breeds such as the Savannah and the Bengal (if below the G5 rank) are also banned from importation.
Australia	New South Wales	January 28, 2006	Restriction	The following dogs are restricted dogs...: (a) American pit bull terrier or pit bull terrier, (b) Japanese tosa, (c) dogo Argentino, (d) fila Brasileiro, (d1) any other dog of a breed, kind or description whose importation into Australia is prohibited by or under the Customs Act 1901 of the Commonwealth, (e) any dog declared by an authorised officer of a council...to be a restricted dog, (f) any other dog of a breed, kind or description prescribed by the regulations for the purposes of this section. Restricted dogs may not be sold, given away, or acquired, and must be spay/neutered. They must be muzzled when in public, wear a special red-and-yellow collar, and may only be handled by a competent adult over the age of 18. The dog must live in a secure enclosure when at home, and the owner must post "Warning: Dangerous Dog" signs on their property. The owner must also register the dog with the local government and notify the government if the dog attacks a person or animal, cannot be found, dies, has moved out of the area, or is now living at a different location within the local government's jurisdiction.
Australia	Queensland	July 1, 2009	Restriction	A dog of a breed prohibited from importation into Australia under the Customs Act 1901 (Cth) is considered "restricted". Breeds currently prohibited under Commonwealth legislation are the dogo Argentino; fila Brasileiro; Japanese tosa; American pit bull terrier (or pit bull terrier); and Perro de Presa Canario (or Presa Canario). A person who owns a "restricted" dog must: keep the dog within a child-proof enclosure; display warning signs at the entrance to the property where the dog is located; muzzle the dog in public and have it under effective control at all times; ensure the dog is spay/neutered, wearing a collar and a prescribed tag, and is microchipped.|-
Australia	South Australia	July 1, 2004	Restriction	The dogo Argentino; fila Brasileiro; Japanese tosa; American pit bull terrier (or pit bull terrier); and Perro de Presa Canario (or Presa Canario) are considered "prescribed breeds". Owners of prescribed breeds: must muzzle their dogs and ensure they are under effective control by means of physical restraint; must spay/neuter their dogs; may not sell or give away their dog, or advertise to sell or give away their dog
Australia	Victoria	November 2, 2005	Restriction	"Restricted breed" dogs are defined as those dogs prohibited from being imported by the Commonwealth Customs (Prohibited Imports) Regulations 1956, including the Dogo Argentino, the Japanese Tosa, the Fila Brasileiro, the Perro de Presa Canario (or Presa Canario) and the American Pit Bull Terrier (or Pit Bull Terrier). Of these, the Pit Bull Terrier and the Perro de Presa Canario are the only breeds currently known to exist in Australia. Restrictions on these breeds include: a permit is required for a person to have more than two of a restricted breed; escape-proof and child-proof enclosures; permanent identification using microchip technology; owners must notify their council if the dog escapes, dies or there is a change of ownership; in the case of a change of ownership, owners must advise prospective owners that the dog is a restricted breed; dogs must be leashed and muzzled when in public places; conspicuous "Beware: Restricted Dog" signs must be displayed on property access points; and; minors are not to own a restricted breed or be in charge of a restricted breed in public places.
Australia	Western Australia	March 2006	Restriction	The following dog breeds are restricted: Dogo Argentino (Argentinean mastiff); Fila Brasileiro (Brazilian mastiff); Japanese Tosa; American Pit Bull Terrier and Pit Bull Terrier breeds; Perro de Presa Canario or Presa Canario; and any dog of a mixed breed that visibly contains any of these breeds.; All restricted breed dogs must be muzzled, leashed and controlled by an adult who is physically capable of handling the dog, in any environment except prescribed enclosures. Restricted breed dogs are also required to be sterilised unless there are extenuating circumstances relating to the animal's physical condition or medical treatment. Owners of these breeds are required to display warning signs where these dogs are kept, meet stringent fencing requirements, notify the local government of changes in the dogs status (moved, died, etc..), and ensure their dogs wear dangerous dog collars.
Fiji			Banned	The following dog breeds are banned in Fiji: Dogo Argentino, Fila Brasileiro, Japanese Tosa and American Pit Bull Terrier. This includes crossbreeds. Furthermore, all serval cats, including crossbreeds and any cats within five generations of several parentage are also prohibited.
New Zealand		November 17, 2003	Restricted	The following restrictions apply to dogs of these breeds: American Pit Bull Terrier, Dogo Argentino, Fila Brasileiro, or Japanese Tosa: It is illegal to import them alive or as semen, ova, or embryos; They are automatically considered "menacing dogs", which must be muzzled and on leash in public; Regional councils may order them spay/neutered; They must be microchipped

== Opposition ==
=== Legal challenges, Ontario 2007-2009 ===
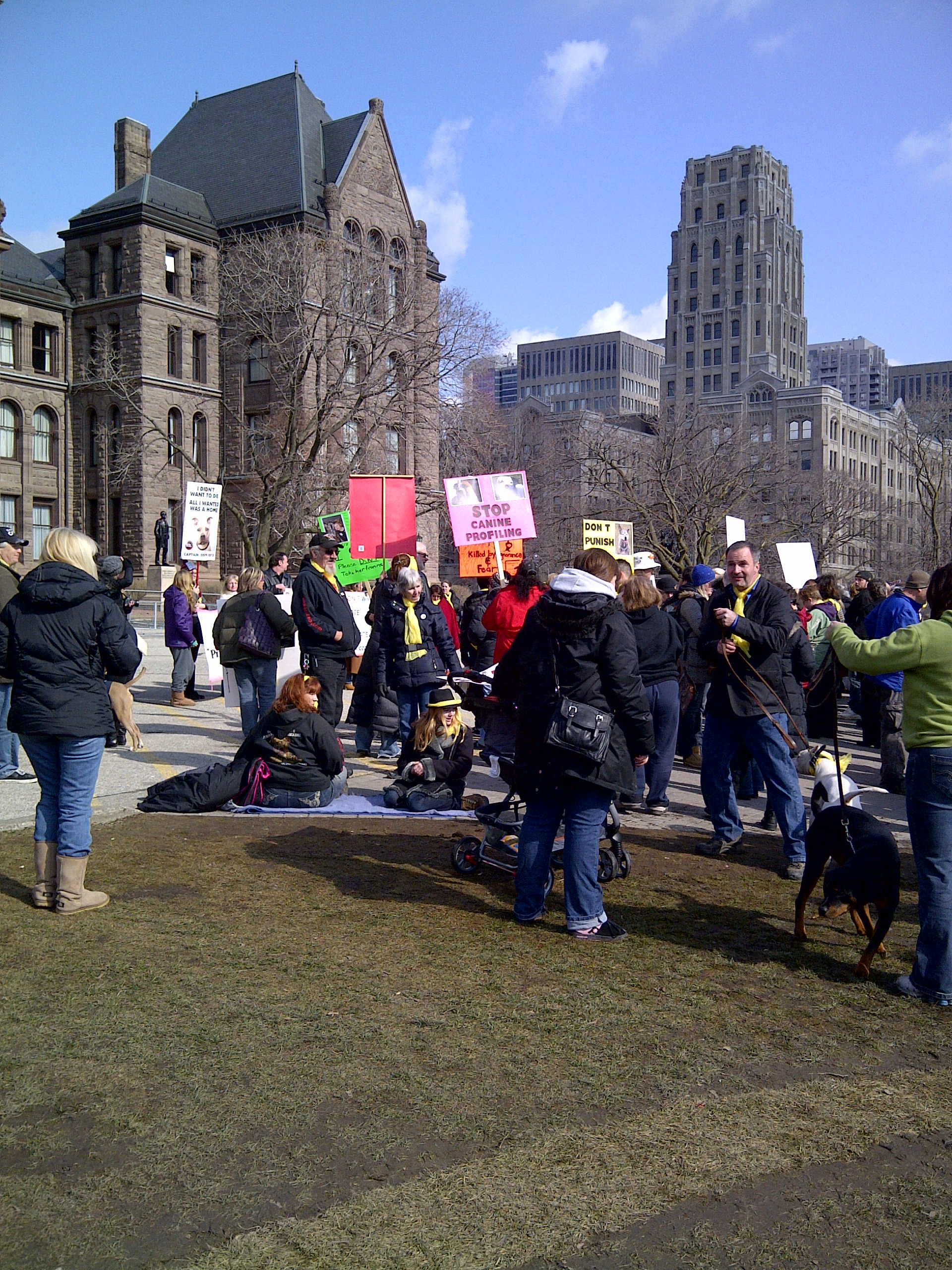
Rally in front of the Ontario Legislative Building in Toronto supporting repeal of breed-specific legislation in Ontario

In Cochrane v. Ontario (Attorney General), 2007 CanLII 9231 (ON S.C.), Ms. Catherine Cochrane sued the Province of Ontario to prevent it from enforcing the Dog Owner's Liability Act (DOLA) ban on pit bull–type dogs, arguing that the law was unconstitutionally broad because the ban was grossly disproportionate to the risk pit bulls pose to public safety, and that the law was unconstitutionally vague because it failed to provide an intelligible definition of pit bulls. She also argued that a provision allowing the Crown to introduce as evidence a veterinarian's certificate certifying that the dog is a pit bull violates the right to a fair trial and the presumption of innocence.

The presiding judge ruled that the DOLA was not overbroad because,

"The evidence with respect to the dangerousness of pit bulls, although conflicting and inconclusive, is sufficient, in my opinion, to constitute a 'reasoned apprehension of harm'. In the face of conflicting evidence as to the feasibility of less restrictive means to protect the public, it was open to the legislature to decide to restrict the ownership of all pit bulls."

The presiding judge found the term "a pit bull terrier" was unconstitutionally vague since it could include an undefined number of dogs similar to the American Pit Bull Terrier, American Staffordshire Terrier, and Staffordshire Bull Terrier. The judge also ruled that the government's ability to introduce a veterinarian's certificate certifying that the dog is a pit bull created a mandatory presumption that the dog was a pit bull, and that this placed an unconstitutional burden of proof upon the defendant.

In 2008, both Ms. Cochrane and the Attorney General of Ontario appealed different aspects of the decision to the Court of Appeal for Ontario. In Cochrane v. Ontario (2008 ONCA 718), the Court of Appeal reversed the lower court's ruling:

- It agreed with the lower court judge in finding that the "overbreadth" claim failed because the legislature had acted on a "reasonable apprehension of harm".
- It disagreed that the definition of pit bull in the Act was insufficiently precise and restored the original wording of "pit bull terrier" on the basis that, when read in the context of "a more comprehensive definition", the phrasing "a pit bull terrier" was sufficiently precise.
- It reversed the trial court and found that the government's ability to introduce a veterinarian's certificate certifying a dog was a pit bull would constitute proof only if the defendant failed to answer the claim: it was therefore a tactical burden, rather an evidentiary burden.

On June 11, 2009 the Supreme Court of Canada declined to hear further appeal of the case, thereby upholding the Ontario ban on pit bulls.

=== Legal challenges, USA ===
Court challenges to breed-specific legislation on constitutional grounds have been largely unsuccessful. Dana M. Campbell summarized the legal challenges and the general court findings as of July 2009:

Court cases challenging BSL have focused on constitutional concerns such as substantive due process, equal protection, and vagueness. Most BSL will survive the minimum scrutiny analysis allowed by the due process clauses of the Constitution's Fifth and Fourteenth Amendments because there is no fundamental right at issue. This analysis requires that the law being challenged must be rationally related to a legitimate government goal or purpose. Because state and local jurisdictions enjoy broad police powers, including protecting the public's safety and welfare, courts have not had trouble finding that BSL is rationally related to the goal of protecting the public from allegedly dangerous breeds.

This has caused big problems for many who use them as police, guide or other service dogs, as they are not always excluded, and in some cases are confiscated and put down.

Challenges based on equal protection arguments are similarly difficult to sustain. Here courts are looking at whether there is a rational purpose for treating pit bull breeds differently from other dog breeds. Dog owners have attacked the rational purpose requirement by arguing either that BSL is over-inclusive, because it bans all dogs of a breed when only certain individuals within the breed have proven to be vicious, or under-inclusive, because many types of dogs have injured people and the BSL fails to include those other breeds. However, again under minimum scrutiny review, BSL will survive as long as the government can establish that the BSL is rationally related to its purpose, even if the law is found to be over-inclusive or under-inclusive.

Claims that BSL is unconstitutionally vague have brought dog owners mixed success. Procedural due process requires that laws provide the public with sufficient notice of the activity or conduct being regulated or banned. Here owners of pit bulls or other banned breeds argue that the breed ban laws do not adequately define just what is a "pit bull" (or other banned breed) for purposes of the ban. Another argument is that the laws are too vague to help the dog-owning public or the BSL enforcement agency—such as animal control or police—to be able to identify whether a dog falls under the BSL if the dog was adopted with an unknown origin or is a mixed breed.

==== Federal courts ====
===== Sentell v. New Orleans and Carrollton Railroad Company =====
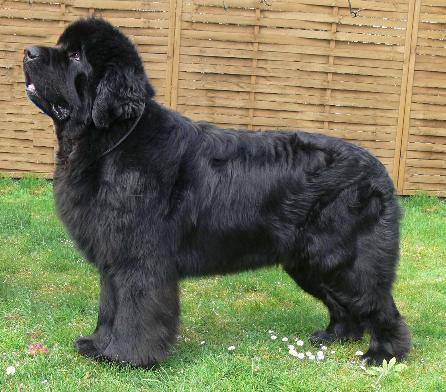
An adult Newfoundland dog

In Sentell v. New Orleans and Carrollton Railroad Company, 166 U.S. 698 (1897), Mr. Sentell sued the New Orleans and Carrollton Railroad Company to recover the value of his female Newfoundland dog that he alleged to have been negligently killed by the railroad company. The company claimed that Louisiana law held that only people who licensed their dogs were entitled to sue for compensation if the dog were killed, and that Mr. Sentell was not entitled to damages since he had not licensed his dog. The trial court in Orleans Parish found for Mr. Sentell and awarded him $250 US, so the railroad company appealed to the Louisiana Court of Appeal, which reversed the decision of the trial court. The Louisiana Supreme Court declined to hear the case, so Mr. Sentell then appealed to the Supreme Court of the United States, which agreed to hear the case.

The Supreme Court ruled against Mr. Sentell and established the precedent in U.S. jurisprudence that the regulation of dogs was within the police power of the state, and that the dogs were not as valuable as horses, cattle, sheep, or other domesticated animals:

It is true that under the Fourteenth Amendment, no state can deprive a person of his life, liberty, or property without due process of law, but in determining what is due process of law, we are bound to consider the nature of the property, the necessity for its sacrifice, and the extent to which it has heretofore been regarded as within the police power. So far as property is inoffensive or harmless, it can only be condemned or destroyed by legal proceedings, with due notice to the owner; but, so far as it is dangerous to the safety or health of the community, due process of law may authorize its summary destruction.... Although dogs are ordinarily harmless, they preserve some of their hereditary wolfish instincts, which occasionally break forth in the destruction of sheep and other helpless animals. Others, too small to attack these animals, are simply vicious, noisy, and pestilent. As their depredations are often committed at night, it is usually impossible to identify the dog or to fix the liability upon the owner, who, moreover, is likely to be pecuniarily irresponsible [not responsible for financial compensation]. In short, the damages are usually such as are beyond the reach of judicial process, and legislation of a drastic nature is necessary to protect persons and property from destruction and annoyance. Such legislation is clearly within the police power of the state. It ordinarily takes the form of a license tax, and the identification of the dog by a collar and tag, upon which the name of the owner is sometimes required to be engraved, but other remedies are not uncommon.

===== Vanater v. Village of South Point =====
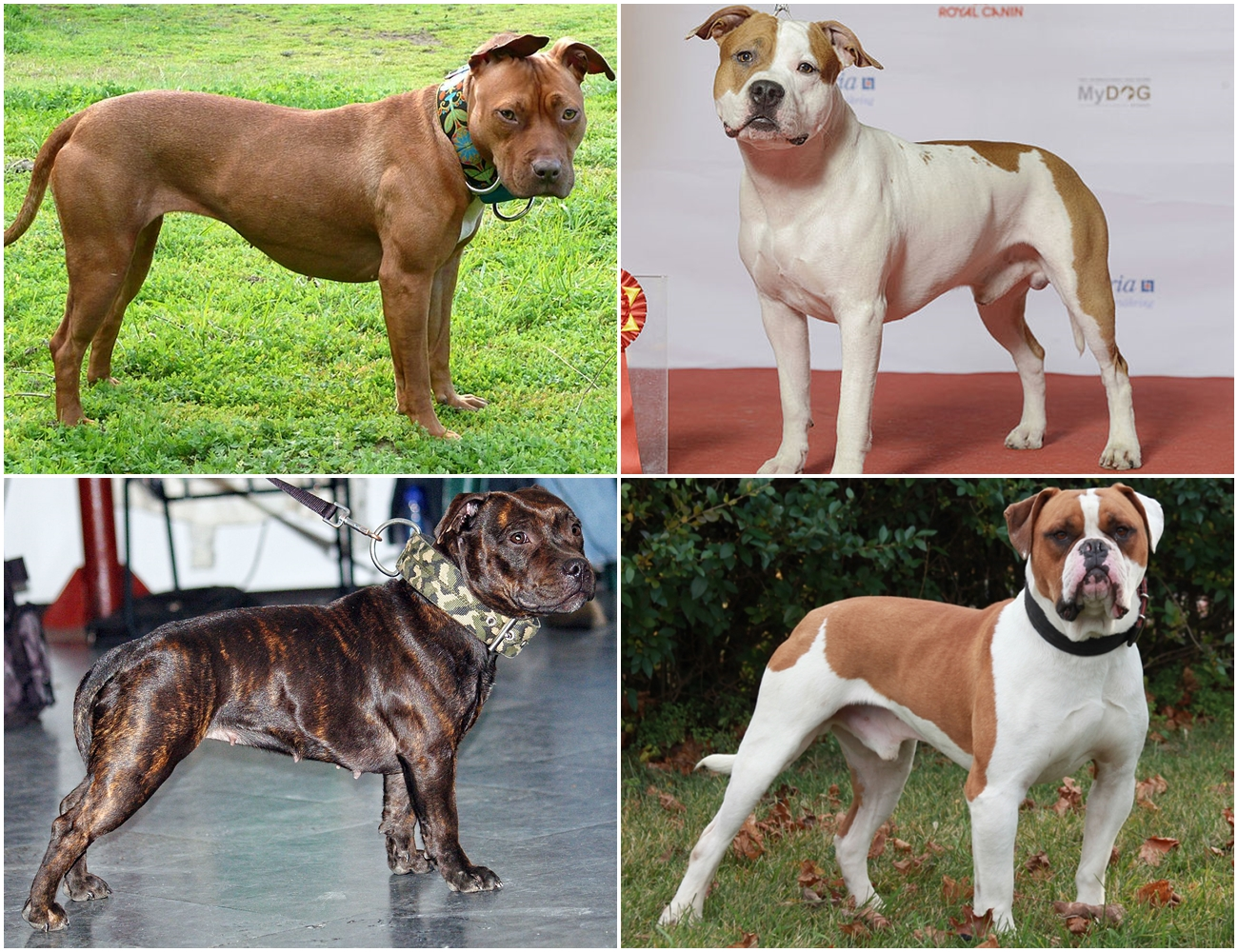
A selection of "pit bull-type" dogs, American Pit Bull Terrier, American Staffordshire Terrier, Staffordshire Bull Terrier, and American Bulldog.

In Vanater v. Village of South Point, 717 F. Supp. 1236 (D. Ohio 1989), the Ohio federal district court held that the criminal ordinance of South Point, Ohio, prohibiting the owning or harboring of pit bull terriers within the village limits was not overly broad, concluding:

The Court concludes that the definitions of a Pit Bull Terrier in this Ordinance are not unconstitutionally vague. An ordinary person could easily refer to a dictionary, a dog buyer's guide or any dog book for guidance and instruction; also, the American Kennel Club and United Kennel Club have set forth standards for Staffordshire Bull Terriers and American Staffordshire Terriers to help determine whether a dog is described by any one of them. While it may be true that some definitions contain descriptions which lack "mathematical certainty", such precision and definiteness is not essential to constitutionality.

The court made the following findings of fact when it determined the village showed that pit bull terriers are uniquely dangerous and therefore, are proper subjects of the village's police power for the protection of the public's health and welfare:

- Pit Bulls ... possess the quality of gameness, which is not a totally clear concept, but which can be described as the propensity to catch and maul an attacked victim unrelentingly until death occurs, or as the continuing tenacity and tendency to attack repeatedly for the purpose of killing. It is clear that the unquantifiable, unpredictable aggressiveness and gameness of Pit Bulls make them uniquely dangerous.
- Pit Bulls have the following distinctive behavioral characteristics: a) grasping strength, b) climbing and hanging ability, c) weight pulling ability, d) a history of frenzy, which is the trait of unusual relentless ferocity or the extreme concentration on fighting and attacking, e) a history of catching, fighting, and killing instinct, f) the ability to be extremely destructive and aggressive, g) highly tolerant of pain, h) great biting strength, i) undying tenacity and courage and they are highly unpredictable.
- While these traits, tendencies or abilities are not unique to Pit Bulls exclusively, Pit Bulls will have these instincts and phenotypical characteristics; most significantly, such characteristics can be latent and may appear without warning or provocation.
- The breeding history of Pit Bulls makes it impossible to rule out a violent propensity for any one dog as gameness and aggressiveness can be hidden for years. Given the Pit Bull's genetical physical strengths and abilities, a Pit Bull always poses the possibility of danger; given the Pit Bull's breeding history as a fighting dog and the latency of its aggressiveness and gameness, the Pit Bull poses a danger distinct from other breeds of dogs which do not so uniformly share those traits.
- While Pit Bulls are not the only breed of dog which can be dangerous or vicious, it is reasonable to single out the breed to anticipate and avoid the dangerous aggressiveness which may be undetectable in a Pit Bull.

===== American Dog Owners Ass'n, Inc. v. Dade County, Fla. =====
In American Dog Owners Ass'n, Inc. v. Dade County, Fla., 728 F.Supp. 1533 (S.D.Fla.,1989), dog owners sued in the federal district court of Florida to prevent Dade County from enforcing a pit bull ban, claiming that there is no such thing as a pit bull dog but rather three separate breeds; however, their own expert witnesses repeatedly identified dogs from the three separate breeds as "pit bull dogs" during the trial. The court upheld the Dade County ordinance, concluding:

Based upon the substantial evidence presented at trial, this court finds that Dade County Ordinance No. 89-022 provides sufficient guidance to dog owners, both in its explicit reference to pit bull dogs, and in its definitional section, to enable pit bull owners to determine whether their dogs fall within the proscriptions of the ordinance....Certainly there are some applications of the ordinance which pass constitutional muster. As long as the enactment is not impermissibly vague in all its applications, this court must uphold its constitutionality. Upon consideration of the evidence presented at trial, the pleadings, memoranda, exhibits and arguments of counsel and upon application of the controlling authority, this court finds that plaintiffs have failed to meet their burden of proof and that the Court is required to uphold the constitutionality of Dade County Ordinance No. 089-22.

===== American Canine Federation, v. City of Aurora, CO =====
In American Canine Federation and Florence Vianzon v. City of Aurora, Colorado, 618 F.Supp.2d 1271 (2009), the plaintiffs sued in the United States District Court for the District of Colorado to prevent Aurora, Colorado, from enforcing a pit bull ban on the grounds that the law was unconstitutionally vague, that the law was an abuse of the city's police power, and that the ban represented an unconstitutional taking of property. The court rejected each of these claims based on existing legal precedents and upheld the city's ordinance.

==== State courts ====
===== Arkansas =====
In Holt v. City of Maumelle, 817 S.W.2d 208 (AR., 1991), Mr. Steele Holt sued the city of Maumelle, Arkansas, in 1988 in an attempt to have its prohibition against pit bulls overturned on the grounds that the ordinance was impermissibly vague, that it was unreasonable to ban pit bull–type dogs, and that the city's Board of Directors committed a breach of contract by passing a pit bull ordinance that it had previously agreed to forego; Mr. Holt also asked that the city pay compensatory damages, punitive damages, and his attorney's fees. The Pulaski County circuit court made a summary judgment dismissing the suit, and Mr. Holt appealed. In 1991, the Arkansas Supreme Court affirmed the circuit court's decision, finding that the pit bull ordinance was not impermissibly vague, that the restrictions were reasonable, and that any agreement made by the city to limit its own legislative powers was null and void since the city's first duty was to protect the public interest.

===== Colorado =====
In Colorado Dog Fanciers, Inc. v. City and County of Denver, 820 P.2d 644, Colo., 1991, the Colorado Supreme Court upheld a Denver city ordinance that dog owners had complained was unconstitutional, along the following lines:

- the dog owners claimed the ordinance was fundamentally unfair and therefore violated their right to procedural due process by forcing them to meet the burden of proving their dog was not a pit bull; however, the higher court found the ordinance was not fundamentally unfair provided the city was required to prove that dogs were pit bulls by the civil standard of "preponderance of evidence" rather than the criminal standard of "beyond a reasonable doubt".
- the dog owners claimed the ordinance violated substantive due process by creating a legislative presumption that a pit bull owner knowingly and voluntarily possesses a pit bull, and because it allowed the use of non-scientific evidence (e.g., expert opinion) to prove a dog is a pit bull; however, the higher court determined the ordinance preserves substantive due process by providing dog owners with a constitutionally adequate post-impoundment hearing, and reversed the trial court's imposition of a pre-impoundment hearing; in addition, the city was not required to prove a dog was a pit bull with mathematical certainty, and could use expert opinion and non-scientific evidence to prove its case in court.
- the dog owners felt the city ordinance treated all pit bulls and substantially similar dogs as inherently dangerous and was, therefore, unconstitutionally overbroad; however, the higher court ruled that outside the limited area of fundamental constitutional rights such as, for example, first amendment rights of speech or association, a statute may not be attacked as overbroad.
- the dog owners felt the term "pit bull" was imprecise and, thus, unconstitutionally vague because the average dog owner is not afforded fair warning of the act prohibited by the ordinance; however, the higher court found the standards for determining whether a dog is a pit bull are readily accessible to dog owners, and because most dog owners are capable of determining the breed or phenotype of their dog, the trial court properly determined that the ordinance provides adequate notice to dog owners and is not unconstitutionally vague.
- the dog owners argued that the ordinance violated the Equal Protection Clause by creating an irrational distinction between one who owns a dog with the physical characteristics of a pit bull and one who owns a dog lacking those characteristics; however, the higher court ruled that there was ample evidence to establish a rational relationship between the city's classification of certain dogs as pit bulls and the legitimate governmental purpose of protecting the health and safety of the city's residents and dogs, and thus the ordinance did not violate the dog owners' right to equal protection of the laws.
- the ordinance is an abuse of the city's police power and constitutes an unconstitutional taking of private property; however, the higher court noted that, in Colorado, dogs are accorded qualified property status and are, thus, subject to the proper exercise of police power for the protection of the public's health, safety, and welfare.

In City & County of Denver v. State of Colorado, 04CV3756, Denver challenged a 2004 law passed by the Colorado General Assembly that prohibited breed specific laws on the grounds that the state law violated the city's home rule authority in regard to animal control legislation. The Denver District Court Judge ruled in favor of Denver, finding that:

- the State failed to provide any new evidence to undermine the original 1990 trial court's decision regarding the differences between pit bulls and other dogs.
- the City had provided new evidence to provide additional support for the original 1990 trial court's decision.
- the 2000 CDC study on fatal dog bite attacks was irrelevant to the narrow issues identified in the 1990 trial court's decision
- the State of Colorado had failed to meet its burden of proof to establish beyond a reasonable doubt that no rational basis for Denver's pit bull ban existed

===== Florida =====
In State of Florida v. Peters, 534 So.2d 760 (Fla.App. 3 Dist. 1988), the Florida Third District Court of Appeal reviewed the city of North Miami ordinance regulating the ownership of pit bull dogs within the city limits, and held: (1) the ordinance did not violate the equal protection clause of the United States Constitution since the city's action in light of the evidence was neither arbitrary or irrational; (2) the ordinance's requirement to obtain liability insurance did not violate due process since the city had the right to regulate dogs under its police powers; (3) the definition of "pit bull" was not unconstitutionally vague, citing substantial precedent that laws requiring "substantial conformance" with a standard are not considered vague; and that mathematical certainty of a dog's identity as a pit bull was not required for a legal determination that a dog was in fact a pit bull.

===== Kansas =====
In Hearn v. City of Overland Park, 772 P.2d 758 (Kan. 1989), the Supreme Court of Kansas reviewed the ruling of a county court that overturned an ordinance of the city of Overland Park regulating the ownership of pit bull dogs within the city limits, and held: (1) The ordinance is not unconstitutionally vague or overbroad; (2) the ordinance does not violate the due process rights of plaintiffs under the United States and Kansas Constitutions; (3) the ordinance does not violate the equal protection clauses of the United States and Kansas Constitutions; and (4) the district court did not err in dismissing the plaintiffs' claim for damages pursuant to 42 U.S.C. § 1983 (1982).

===== Kentucky =====
In Bess v. Bracken County Fiscal Court, 210 S.W.3d 177 (Ky.App., 2006), the Kentucky Court of Appeals reviewed a Bracken County ordinance that banned pit bull terriers. The appellants (Mr. Bess and Mr. Poe) had sought a temporary injunction against the ordinance in the Bracken County Circuit Court. The court dismissed the motion on the grounds that the police power of the Fiscal Court allowed it to ban pit bull terriers and seize them without compensation. The appellants appealed on the grounds that:

1. that the ordinance is inconsistent with KRS (Kentucky Revised Statutes) Chapter 258 and specifically with the definition of "vicious dog" contained in KRS 258.095;
2. that it impermissibly allows the forfeiture of property without compensation;
3. that it denies dog owners procedural due process; and
4. that it impedes the right of nonresident owners of pit bull terriers to travel through Bracken County.

The Appeals court upheld the Bracken County ordinance, finding that:

1. the breed-specific ordinance supplemented, rather than replaced or superseded, the definition of a "vicious dog" in the state statute;
2. the banning of pit bull terriers was permissible under the police power, and that property seized under the police power was not subject to compensation;
3. dog owners had the right of appeal to the Circuit Court under the ordinance, so the right of due process was preserved; and
4. the ordinance did not discriminate against non-resident pit bull owners, and that the appellants had not provided any evidence that traveling with a pet "occupies a position fundamental to the concept of a federal union."

===== Massachusetts =====
In American Dog Owners Ass'n, Inc. v. City of Lynn, 404 Mass. 73, 533 N.E.2d 642 (Mass.,1989), the Massachusetts Supreme Judicial Court reviewed a series of ordinances enacted by Lynn, Massachusetts, targeting dogs variously referred to as "American Staffordshire Terrier[s], a/k/a American Pit Bull Terrier[s] or Bull Terrier[s]" (July 1985); "American Staffordshire, Staffordshire Pit Bull Terrier or Bull Terrier, hereinafter referred to as 'Pit Bulls'" (June 1986); and ""American Staffordshire, Staffordshire Pit Bull Terrier, Bull Terrier or any mixture thereof" (September 1986).

The Supreme Judicial Court determined that the issue was technically moot since each of the ordinances in question had been repealed by passage of a subsequent "pit bull" ordinance in June 1987; however, the court specifically observed (but did not rule) that the 1987 ordinance relied on the "common understanding and usage" of the names of the breeds in question, and warned that

the Lynn Pit Bull ban ordinance depends for enforcement on the subjective understanding of dog officers of the appearance of an ill-defined "breed", leaves dog owners to guess at what conduct or dog "look" is prohibited, and requires "proof" of a dog's "type" which, unless the dog is registered, may be impossible to furnish. Such a law gives unleashed discretion to the dog officers charged with its enforcement, and clearly relies on their subjective speculation whether a dog's physical characteristics make it what is "commonly understood" to be a "Pit Bull".

As a result of this case, breed-specific legislation in the United States often relies on the published standards of the American Kennel Club and United Kennel Club to clearly identify the characteristics of dogs subject to regulation as "pit bulls".

===== New Mexico =====
In Garcia v. Village of Tijeras, 767 P.2d 355 (1988), the New Mexico Court of Appeals reviewed an ordinance of the Village of Tijeras that banned the ownership or possession of a breed of dog "known as American Pit Bull Terrier"; any dog found in violation of the ordinance after a court hearing would be euthanized. The court held against each of the defendants' claims and upheld the ordinance on the following grounds:

1. The defendants claimed the ordinance violated their due process rights because it was vague in how it defined "pit bull"; however, the ordinance was not vague because vagueness applies in the sense of "to whom does the law apply." The law was therefore not vague since the defendants knew the ordinance applied to them.
2. The defendants claimed the ordinance was not rationally related to the purpose of preventing pit bull attacks because environment and training are more important than genetics in determining how a dog acts; however, the court held there was substantial, credible evidence of breed-specific issues that the Village's actions were warranted.
3. The defendants claimed that the ordinance violated equal protection rights because it singled out the owners of pit bulls; however, the court ruled that there was substantial, credible evidence that pit bulls posed a special threat to the people of Tijeras and that there were no grounds to overturn the ordinance.
4. The defendants claimed the ordinance denied them procedural due process against the loss of property; however, the court ruled that the court hearings specified by the ordinance were sufficient due process to ensure the owners had "the opportunity to be heard and present evidence would occur at a meaningful time, that is, prior to the destruction of the dog."
5. The defendants claimed the ordinance would deprive them of property without compensation; however, the court ruled that well-established precedent did not require compensation for property seized under a city's police powers.

===== New York =====
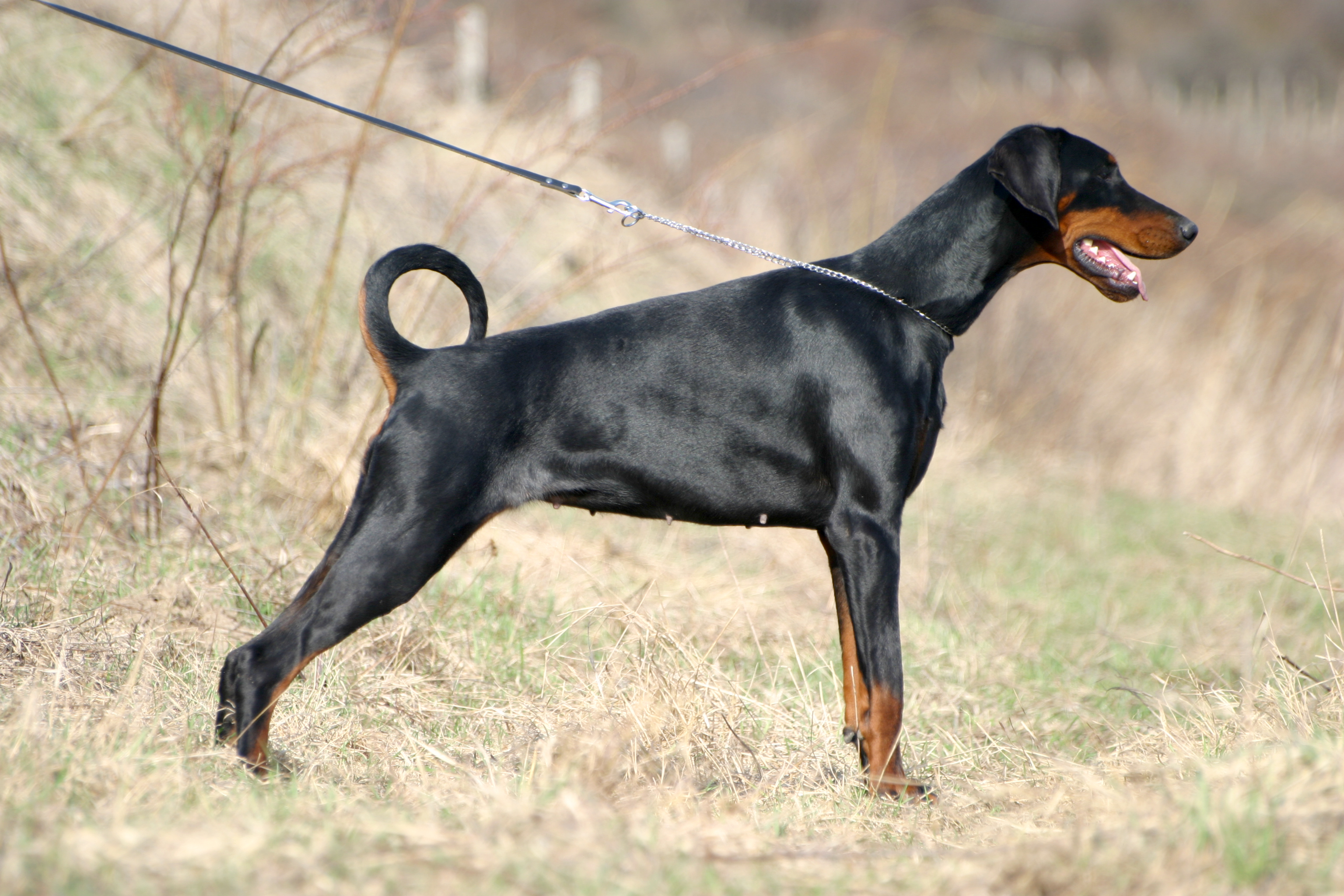
A Doberman Pinscher

The New York City Housing Authority updated their pet policy in 2010 to exclude dogs over 25 pounds and specifically prohibit Doberman Pinschers, Pit bulls, Rottweilers, and any mixes thereof.

===== Ohio =====
In Toledo v. Tellings – Reversed – 871 N.E.2d 1152 (Ohio, 2007), the Ohio Sixth District Court of Appeal struck down a portion of the Toledo, Ohio, municipal code that limited people to owning only one pit bull. The law relied on a state definition of a vicious dog as one that has bitten or killed a human, has killed another dog, or "belongs to a breed that is commonly known as a Pit Bull dog." The court held that the legislation was void for violation of a Pit Bull owner's right to due process since the owner could not appeal a designation of his pet as a vicious dog. The court held that,

"Since we conclude that there is no evidence that pit bulls are inherently dangerous or vicious, then the city ordinance limitation on ownership is also arbitrary, unreasonable and discriminatory."

The Supreme Court of Ohio reversed the Court of Appeal (Toledo v. Tellings, 114 Ohio St.3d 278, 2007-Ohio-3724), and reinstated the Toledo ordinance for the following reasons:

- {¶ 30} The court of appeals found R.C. 955.11 and 955.22 and Toledo Municipal Code 505.14 unconstitutional with respect to procedural due process, substantive due process, and equal protection, and under the void-for-vagueness doctrine. We disagree.
- {¶ 31} First, the court of appeals declared that the laws violated procedural due process pursuant to State v. Cowan, 103 Ohio St.3d 144, 2004-Ohio-4777, 814 N.E.2d 846. In Cowan, a Portage County deputy dog warden determined two dogs to be vicious following a complaint that the dogs had attacked a woman. Id. at ¶ 1. The dogs were determined to be vicious because of the alleged attack, not because they were pit bulls. We held that when a dog is determined to be "vicious" under R.C. 955.11(A)(4)(a), procedural due process requires that the owner have notice and an opportunity to be heard before the owner is charged with a crime. Id. at ¶ 13.
- {¶ 32} In Cowan, the dogs were determined to be vicious under the first two subsections of R.C. 955.11(A)(4)(a) because they had caused injury to a person. Thus, the case concerned the dog warden's unilateral classification of the dogs as vicious. However, in this case, the "vicious dogs" at issue are those classified as pit bulls under the third subsection of R.C. 955.11(A)(4)(a). Unlike the situation in Cowan, the General Assembly has classified pit bulls generally as vicious; there is no concern about unilateral administrative decision-making on a case-by-case basis. The clear statutory language alerts all owners of pit bulls that failure to abide by the laws related to vicious dogs and pit bulls is a crime. Therefore, the laws do not violate the rights of pit bull owners to procedural due process.
- {¶ 33} Second, R.C. 955.11 and 955.22 and Toledo Municipal Code 505.14 are not unconstitutional for violating substantive due process or equal protection rights. Laws limiting rights, other than fundamental rights, are constitutional with respect to substantive due process and equal protection if the laws are rationally related to a legitimate goal of government. See State v. Thompkins (1996), 75 Ohio St.3d 558, 560–561, 664 N.E.2d 926. As we discussed previously when evaluating whether the statutes and ordinance in question are valid exercises of state and city police power, R.C. 955.11 and 955.22 January Term, 2007 and Toledo Municipal Code 505.14 are rationally related to a legitimate government interest.
- {¶ 34} Finally, the court of appeals erred in holding that R.C. 955.11 and 955.22 and Toledo Municipal Code 505.14 are void for vagueness. This court has previously held that the term "pit bull" is not unconstitutionally void for vagueness. In State v. Anderson, we stated: "In sum, we believe that the physical and behavioral traits of pit bulls together with the commonly available knowledge of dog breeds typically acquired by potential dog owners or otherwise possessed by veterinarians or breeders are sufficient to inform a dog owner as to whether he owns a dog commonly known as a pit bull dog." 57 Ohio St.3d 168, 173, 566 N.E.2d 1224.
- {¶ 35} In conclusion, the state and the city of Toledo possess the constitutional authority to exercise police powers that are rationally related to a legitimate interest in public health, safety, morals, or general welfare. Here, evidence proves that pit bulls cause more damage than other dogs when they attack, cause more fatalities in Ohio than other dogs, and cause Toledo police officers to fire their weapons more often than people or other breeds of dogs cause them to fire their weapons. We hold that the state of Ohio and the city of Toledo have a legitimate interest in protecting citizens from the dangers associated with pit bulls, and that R.C. 955.11(A)(4)(a)(iii) and 955.22 and Toledo Municipal Code 505.14 are rationally related to that interest and are constitutional.

Mr. Tellings appealed the case to the Supreme Court of the United States, which declined to hear the case.

===== Texas =====
In City of Richardson v. Responsible Dog Owners of Texas, 794 S.W.2d 17 (Tex. 1990), several people ("Responsible Dog Owners") sued the city of Richardson, Texas, to prevent it from enforcing restrictions on pit bulls within its city limits on the grounds that the Texas state legislature had passed legislation preempting the a city's power to adopt an ordinance regulating the keeping of dogs. The trial court granted summary judgment in favor of the city, but the Texas Court of Appeals reversed the trial court's decision (781 S.W.2d 667). The Supreme Court of Texas reversed the Court of Appeals and upheld the original decision on the grounds that

Under article XI, section 5 of the Texas Constitution, home-rule cities have broad discretionary powers provided that no ordinance "shall contain any provision inconsistent with the Constitution of the State, or of the general laws enacted by the Legislature of this State...." Thus, the mere fact that the legislature has enacted a law addressing a subject does not mean that the subject matter is completely preempted....Although there is a small area of overlap in the provisions of the narrow statute and the broader ordinance, we hold that it is not fatal.

===== Texas Health and Safety Code =====
In the state of Texas, the State Health and Safety Code prohibits breed-specific legislation as stated

Sec. 822.047. LOCAL REGULATION OF DANGEROUS DOGS. A county or municipality may place additional requirements or restrictions on dangerous dogs if the requirements or restrictions:

(1) are not specific to one breed or several breeds of dogs; and
(2) are more stringent than restrictions provided by this subchapter.

Added by Acts 1991, 72nd Leg., ch. 916, Sec. 1, eff. September 1, 1991.

===== Washington =====
In McQueen v. Kittitas County, 115 Wash. 672, 677 (1921), the Washington Supreme Court established the broadly accepted precedent that cities have the power to regulate dogs, even to the point of banning specific breeds.

[D]ogs do not stand on the same plane as horses, cattle, sheep, and other domesticated animals...On the general question, it is the almost universal current of authority that dogs are a subject of the police power of the state, and their keeping subject to any kind of license or regulation, even to absolute prohibition...since dogs are a subject of the police power, we see no reason why the legislature may not make distinctions between breeds, sizes and the localities in which they may be kept. The object of the statute is protection. The purpose is to prevent injuries to persons and property by dogs. Any distinction founded upon reasons at least, is therefore valid..."

In American Dog Owners Ass'n v. City of Yakima, 777 P.2d 1046 (Wash.1989, en banc), the Washington Supreme Court reviewed a pit bull ban in the city of Yakima. The dog owners asked a state court to prevent Yakima from enforcing its ban on pit bull dogs. The trial court issued a temporary injunction against the city and accepted motions for summary judgment from both the dog owners and the city. The court decided in favor of the city and lifted the injunction, whereupon the dog owners appealed to the Washington Supreme Court on the grounds that the ordinance was vague because a person of ordinary intelligence could not tell what was prohibited, and that the trial court had improperly decided the summary judgment in favor of the city.

The Washington Supreme Court ruled that the ordinance was not unconstitutionally vague because it specified the dog breeds that together fit the definition of "pit bull", whereas an earlier case in Massachusetts, American Dog Owners Ass'n, Inc. v. Lynn, 404 Mass. 73, 533 N.E.2d 642 (1989), had resulted in the pit bull ban being annulled because the ordinance did not specify in sufficient detail what a "pit bull" was; in addition, the higher court ruled that the summary judgment had been properly awarded, thus upholding the Yakima pit bull ban.

===== Wisconsin =====
In Dog Federation of Wisconsin, Inc. v. City of South Milwaukee, 178 Wis.2d 353, 504 N.W.2d 375 (Wis.App.,1993), the Wisconsin Court of Appeals reviewed the appeal of a trial court decision upholding a pit bull ban in South Milwaukee, Wisconsin. The Court of Appeals upheld the trial court on the following grounds:

- The dog owners claimed that the definition of "pit bull" in the ordinance was too vague in its description of a "pit bull"; however, the Court of Appeals found that the ordinance's reference to the breed descriptions of the American Kennel Club and United Kennel Club were enough to allow someone to know whether they owned a "pit bull" or not
- The dog owners claimed the pit bull ban ordinance was overbroad because it treated "all pit bulls as if they are inherently dangerous, and more prone to cause harm than other dogs as a matter of law"; however, the higher court found that the prohibition against "overbroad" ordinances protected only fundamental rights such as the freedom of speech, and that there was no fundamental right to own a particular breed of dog.
- The dog owners claimed the pit bull ban violated their right to equal protection since pit bulls were singled out for prohibition, for which there was "no scientific or empirical basis" and that dangerousness is a function of "environment, training, and upbringing." The Court of Appeals found that the evidence of the unique danger posed by pit bull–type dogs was sufficient that the dog owners could not prove beyond a reasonable doubt that the discrimination was unfounded, as required by previous court precedent.

== See also ==
- List of dog fighting breeds
