= Moscow Water Dog =

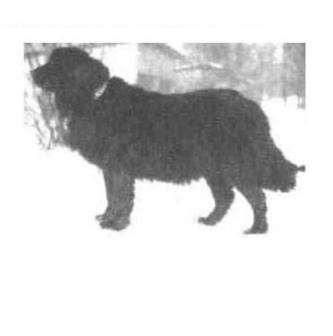
- Other names: Moscow Diver; Moscow Retriever; Moskovsky Vodolaz (Московский Водолаз)
- Origin: Russia
- Breed status: Extinct. Not recognized as a breed by any major kennel club.

The Moscow Water Dog, also known as the Moscow Diver, Moscow Retriever or Moskovsky Vodolaz, was a little-known dog breed derived from the Newfoundland, Caucasian Shepherd Dog and East European Shepherd. It is now extinct, but was used in the development of the Black Russian Terrier. The Moscow Water Dog was produced only by the Red Star Kennels, the state-operated organization chartered to provide working dogs for the armed services of the Soviet Union. The breeding program was discontinued as the dogs would attack drowning victims instead of saving them.

After World War II, there were very few working dogs in the Soviet Union, as many had been killed during the war. Some were imported but there were not enough to establish a dedicated breeding programme for a specific breed. The Central Military School of Working Dogs (the Red Star Kennels), under the command of Colonel G. P. Medvedev began working on developing a number of its own specialised breeds by crossing the available stock. A few breeds were established, including the Moscow Newfoundland, a cross of the German Shepherd Dog and the Newfoundland; the Moscow Great Dane, using the German Shepherd Dog and the Great Dane; the Brudasty Hound, which was an Airedale Terrier and Russian Hound cross; the Moscow Watchdog, a combination of the St. Bernard and the Caucasian Shepherd Dog; and the Moscow Water Dog. The most successful breed to come out of the programme was the Black Russian Terrier, which gained international recognition in 1984; it derived from a combination of 14 different breeds, including the Moscow Water Dog in the later stages of its development.
