= Black Russian Terrier =

Russian breed of dog

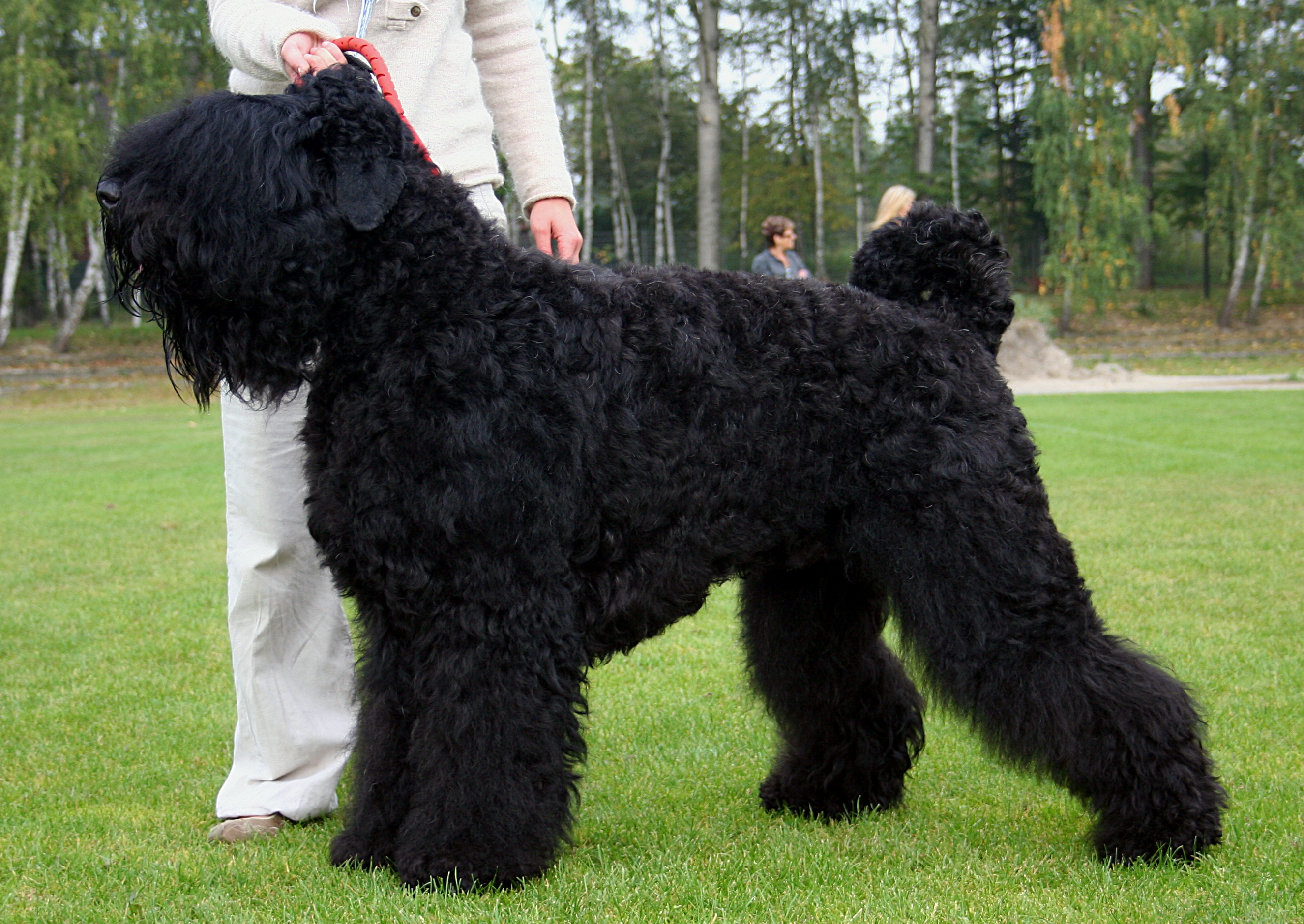
- Black Russian Terrier at a dog show in Poland
- Other names: Russian Terrier, Tchornyi Terrier, BRT, RBT
- Origin: USSR
Traits
Height	Males	72–76 centimetres (28–30 in)
	Females	68–72 centimetres (27–28 in)
Weight	Males	50–60 kilograms (110–130 lb)
	Females	45–50 kilograms (99–110 lb)
- Coat: Rough and thick, slightly waved
- Color: Black
Kennel club standards
- Fédération Cynologique Internationale: standard

The Black Russian Terrier (Russian: Русский чёрный терьер), also known as the Chornyi Terrier (chornyi being Russian for black), is a breed of dog from the USSR. It was originally bred in the Red Star (Krasnaya Zvezda) Kennel during the late 1940s and the early 1950s for use as a military/working dog. The Black Russian Terrier is a breed recognized by the FCI (September 1983), AKC (July 2004), CKC, KC, ANKC, NZKC and other cynological organizations. The contemporary Black Russian Terrier is a working dog, guarding dog, sporting and companion dog.

Despite its name, the Black Russian Terrier is not a true terrier: it is believed that about seventeen breeds were used in its development, including the Airedale Terrier, the Giant Schnauzer, the Rottweiler, the Newfoundland, the Caucasian Shepherd Dog, the South Russian Shepherd Dog and other breeds.

== History ==
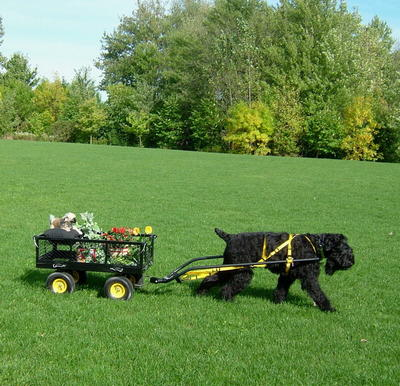
Black Russian Terriers have traditionally been used for a wide variety of tasks, such as carting

The Black Russian Terrier was developed in the former USSR in Red Star (Krasnaya Zvezda) Kennel by the state for use as a military/working dogs. The breeding stock was largely imported from countries where the Red Army was active during the Second World War, especially East Germany. Breeds used in the development include the Giant Schnauzer, Airedale Terrier, Rottweiler, Newfoundland, Caucasian Shepherd Dog, South Russian Shepherd Dog and other breeds. The Black Russian Terrier was bred for working ability, rather than appearance, and early examples only resembled today's Black Russian Terrier in their build and coat type. They were bred solely by the state owned Red Star Kennel in Moscow until 1957, when some puppies were sold to civilian breeders. These breeders began to breed for looks (as the original was rather plain) while retaining working ability. In time, the breed spread to the other parts of USSR like Saint Petersburg, Siberia, Ukraine and later to the first European country Finland and next to the other European countries: Hungary, Czechoslovakia, Poland, Germany and finally to the United States, Canada, Australia and others.

In 1955 the first working examples of the breed were put on show at an exhibition in Moscow and the first Breed Standard was published in 1958, which was then adopted by the Fédération Cynologique Internationale in 1984. In 1996 The Russian Federation Working Dog-breeders & Russian Kynological Federation (RKF) adopted a second Standard for the breed more in line to the modern day Russian Black Terrier. And it was also in 1996 that the breed was first introduced into the UK. In 1998 The Kennel Club added the Russian Black Terrier to the Import Register.

== Description ==
=== Coat ===
The coat is a double coat with a coarse outer guard hair over a softer undercoat. The coat is hard and dense, never soft, woolly, silky or frizzy. It should be trimmed to between 5 and 15 cm (2.0 and 5.9 in) in length. It should form a beard and eyebrows on the face, and a slight mane around the withers and neck that is more pronounced in males. The coat is low-shedding and the colour is black or black with some scattered gray hairs.

=== Size ===
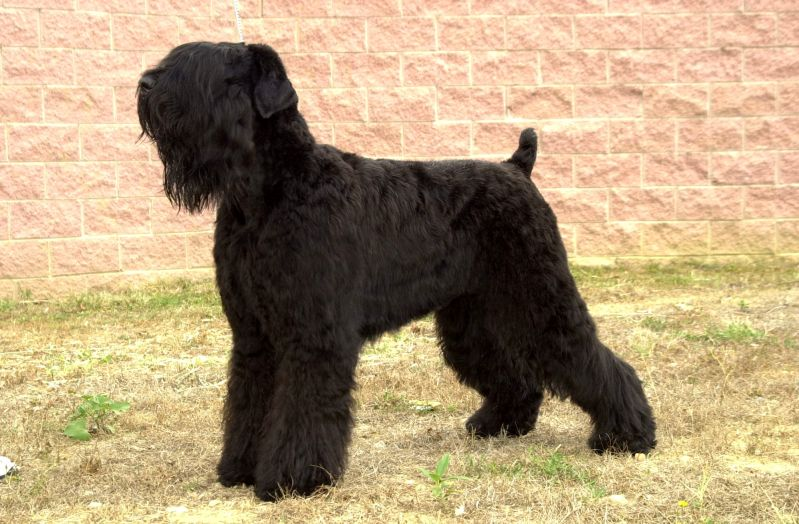
Black Russian Terrier with a docked tail

According to the FCI standard the male stands 72 to 76 cm and not more than 78 cm at the withers compared to the female's 68–72 cm and not more than 74 cm. The male weighs between 50 and 60 kg (110 and 130 lb), and the females weigh between 45 and 50 kg (99 and 110 lb). Nowadays, even larger individuals are tolerated if the dog is well proportioned and retains correct movements. Dogs exhibited by the kennel club are slightly taller by about half an inch.

At maturity (over 18 months of age), the AKC standard recommends 27-30 inches for males with the desired height between 27 and 29 inches and 26 and 29 inches for females with the desired height between 26 and 28 inches. A mature male less than 27 inches or more than 30 inches at the withers is considered a serious fault. A mature female less than 26 inches or more than 29 inches at the withers is considered a serious fault. Although the standard also states "Height consideration should not outweigh that of type, proportion, movement and other functional attributes." In proportions, a Black Russian Terrier should be slightly longer than tall, a ratio of 9 ½ to 10 being ideal.

== Care ==
The Black Russian Terrier, because of its breeding as a working dog, has a very strong "work ethic", and needs a job to do in order to be happy. Early training is a must and they are very responsive to firm, consistent training, excelling at obedience competitions. They also perform well in other dog sports, such as agility, and Schutzhund training. They have a low-shedding coat, and need grooming several times a week. Dogs who compete in conformation need to be groomed a minimum of every three weeks to keep the coat in show condition. This breed forms a strong bond with a single person and will not thrive if sent to boarding facilities. The young Black Russian Terrier should not be forced to exercise as a pup and tend to sleep the majority of the day because they grow so quickly [around 1 kg per week], they may become hyperactive and destructive when older if not provided an outlet for its energy. Once the dog has reached maturity their energy level decreases dramatically and they are most content lying near their owner.

== Health ==
A 2024 UK study found a life expectancy of 10.9 years for the breed compared to an average of 12.7 for purebreeds and 12 for crossbreeds.

The Black Russian Terrier is prone to certain hereditary diseases:

Major concerns:

- Hip dysplasia
- Elbow dysplasia
- Hyperuricosuria
- Juvenile laryngeal paralysis and polyneuropathy

Minor concerns

- Hypertrophic osteodystrophy (HOD): a nutritionally based developmental disease especially in young, heavy, fast-growing puppies
- Panosteitis (pano or wandering lameness): a nutritionally based developmental disease especially in young, heavy, fast-growing puppies
- Heart disease: the most common heart problems are aortic stenosis, mitral valve dysplasia, cardiomyopathy
- Eyes disease: the most common eyes problems are ectropion, entropion, conjunctivitis
- Allergies are a common ailment in dogs, and the Black Russian Terrier is no exception. There are three main types of allergies: food allergies, contact allergies and inhalant allergies

Other problems

- Hot spot
- Fungal infection—especially in ears and beard area

== See also ==
- List of dog breeds
