= Ovcharka =

Ovcharka (Russian: овчарка, lit. 'sheep dog') may refer to:

- Armenian Gampr, a landrace dog
- Caucasian Shepherd Dog, a breed of dog also known as the Caucasian Ovcharka
- Central Asian Shepherd Dog, a breed of dog also known as the Central Asian Ovcharka
- South Russian Ovcharka, a large, long-haired white sheepdog
- East European Shepherd, a breed of dog also known as the Belarusian Ovcharka
