= Tosa (dog breed) =

Dog breed

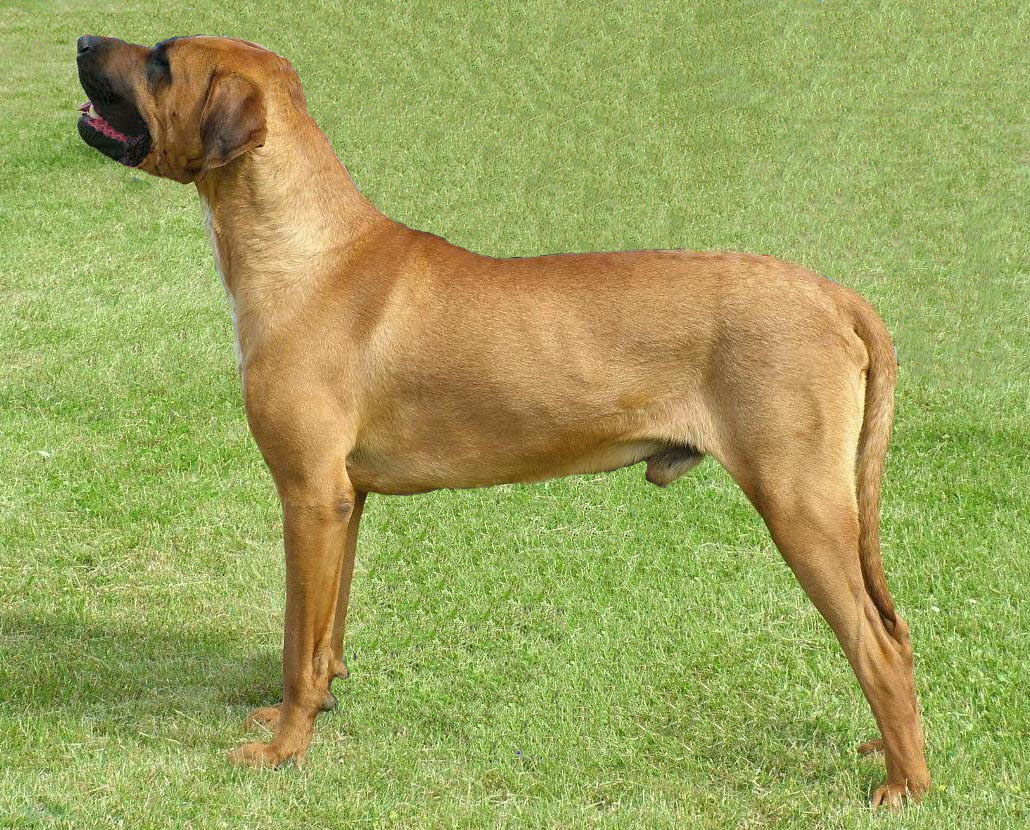
- Other names: Japanese Tosa; Tosa Tōken (土佐闘犬); Japanese Fighting Dog; Tosa Fighting Dog
- Origin: Japan
Kennel club standards
- Japan Kennel Club: standard
- Fédération Cynologique Internationale: standard

The Tosa (Note: Tosa Inu, Tosa-ken (土佐犬; [to.sa i.nɯ, -sa.keɴ])), also known as the Japanese Mastiff, is a dog breed of Japanese origin that is considered rare. It was originally bred in Tosa, Shikoku (present-day Kōchi), as a fighting dog and the only dog legally allowed in Japanese dog fighting. Ownership is restricted in some countries as a dangerous breed.

== Appearance ==
The Tosa vary considerably in size, with the Japanese-bred dogs tending to be about half the size of those bred outside the country. The Japanese breed generally weighs between 36 and 61 kilograms (80 and 135 lb), while non-Japanese breeders have focused on dogs that weigh from 60 to 90 kg (130 to 200 lb) and stand 62 to 82 cm (24 to 32 in) at the withers. The coat is characterized by its short and smooth appearance and is often red, brindle, or fawn, but occasionally it can be a dull black. Maintenance of the coat is usually minimal. Dogs can occasionally tip the scale at 91 kilograms (200 lb). In Japan, they are considered the equivalent of sumo wrestlers and are even depicted in wrestling accoutrements.

== History ==
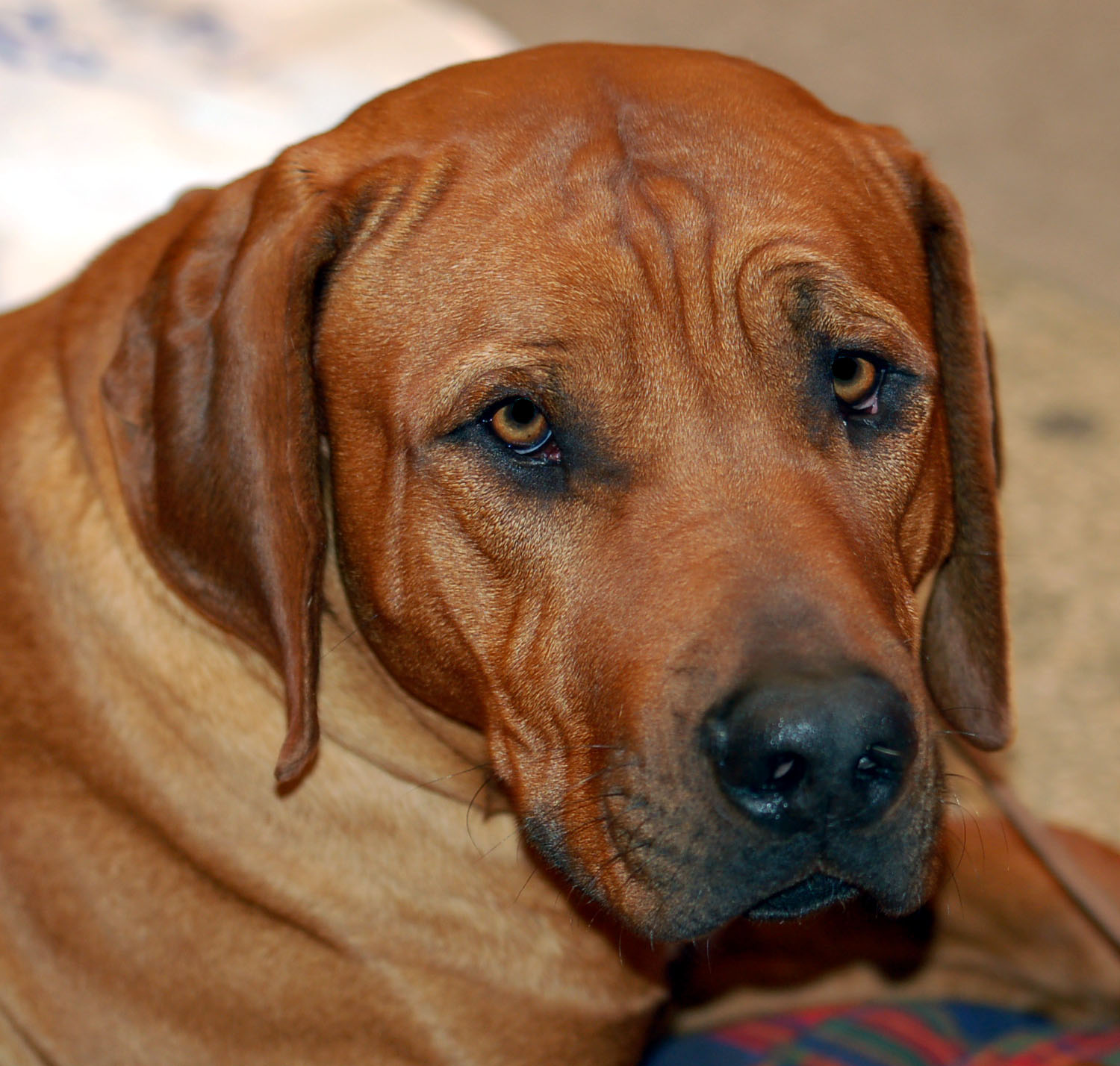
The head of a Tosa

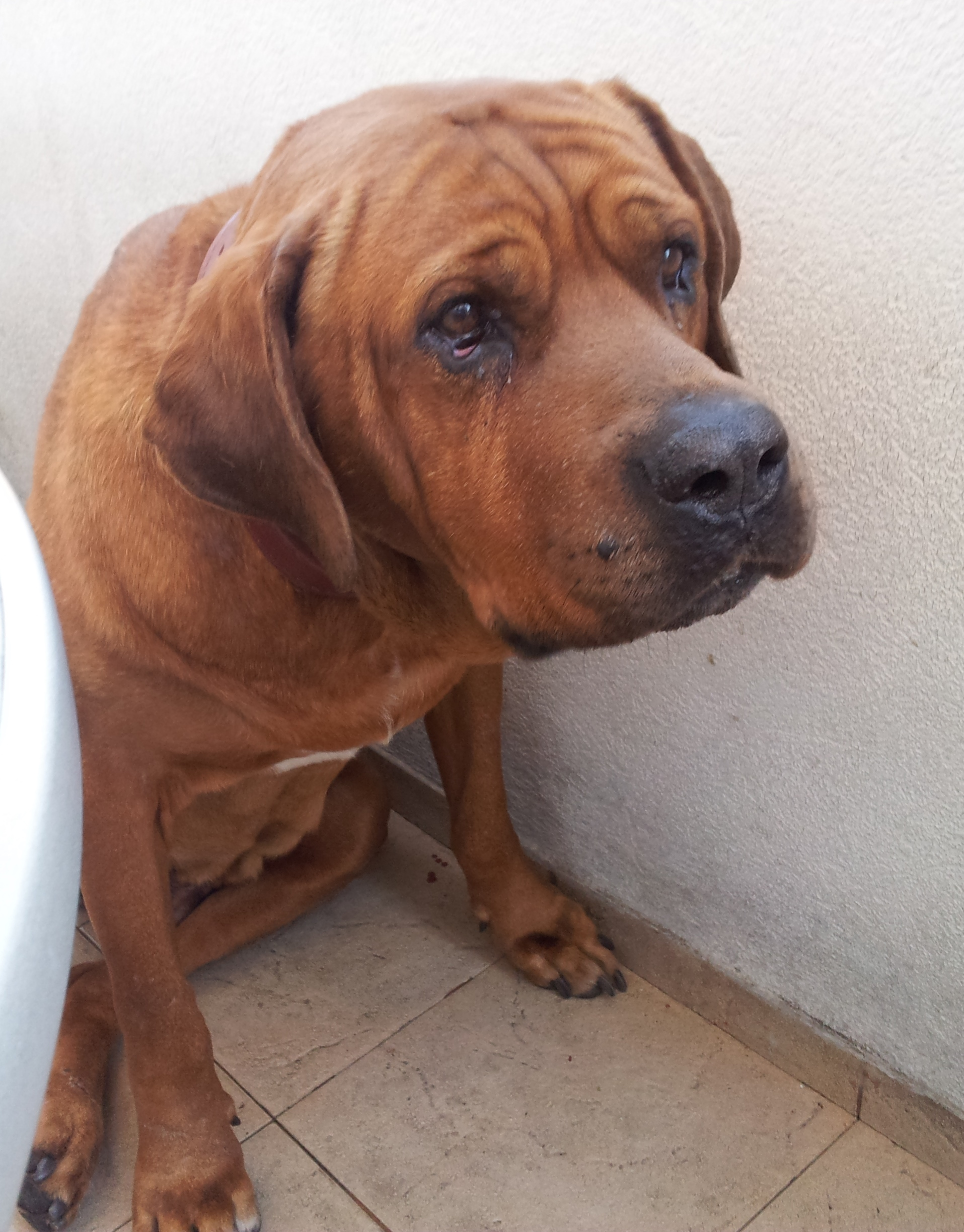
Tosa Inu

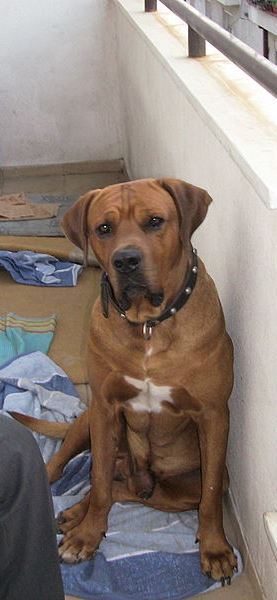
The head of a Tosa

This breed originated in the second half of the 19th century. The breed started with the native Shikoku-Inu (an indigenous dog weighing about 25 kilograms (55 pounds) and standing about 55 centimetres high). These dogs were crossed with European dog breeds, such as the Old English Bulldog in 1872, the English Mastiff in 1874, the Saint Bernard and German Pointer in 1876, the Great Dane in 1924, and the Bull Terrier. The aim was to breed a larger, more powerful dog specifically for dog fighting competitions in Japan. The heyday of Tosa breeding was between 1924 and 1933, when it was said that there were more than 5,000 Tosa breeders in Japan.

== Use ==
In South Korea, it is one of the main dog meat breeds, along with Nureongi dogs.

== Regional variants ==
=== South Korea ===
The Tosa Inu was introduced to South Korea from Japan in 1955, quickly becoming the dominant breed used in dog fighting—a practice locally known as Tugyeon (투견). Local breeding of the Tosa expanded to the point where Korean-bred dogs were exported to Taiwan.

== Legal matters ==
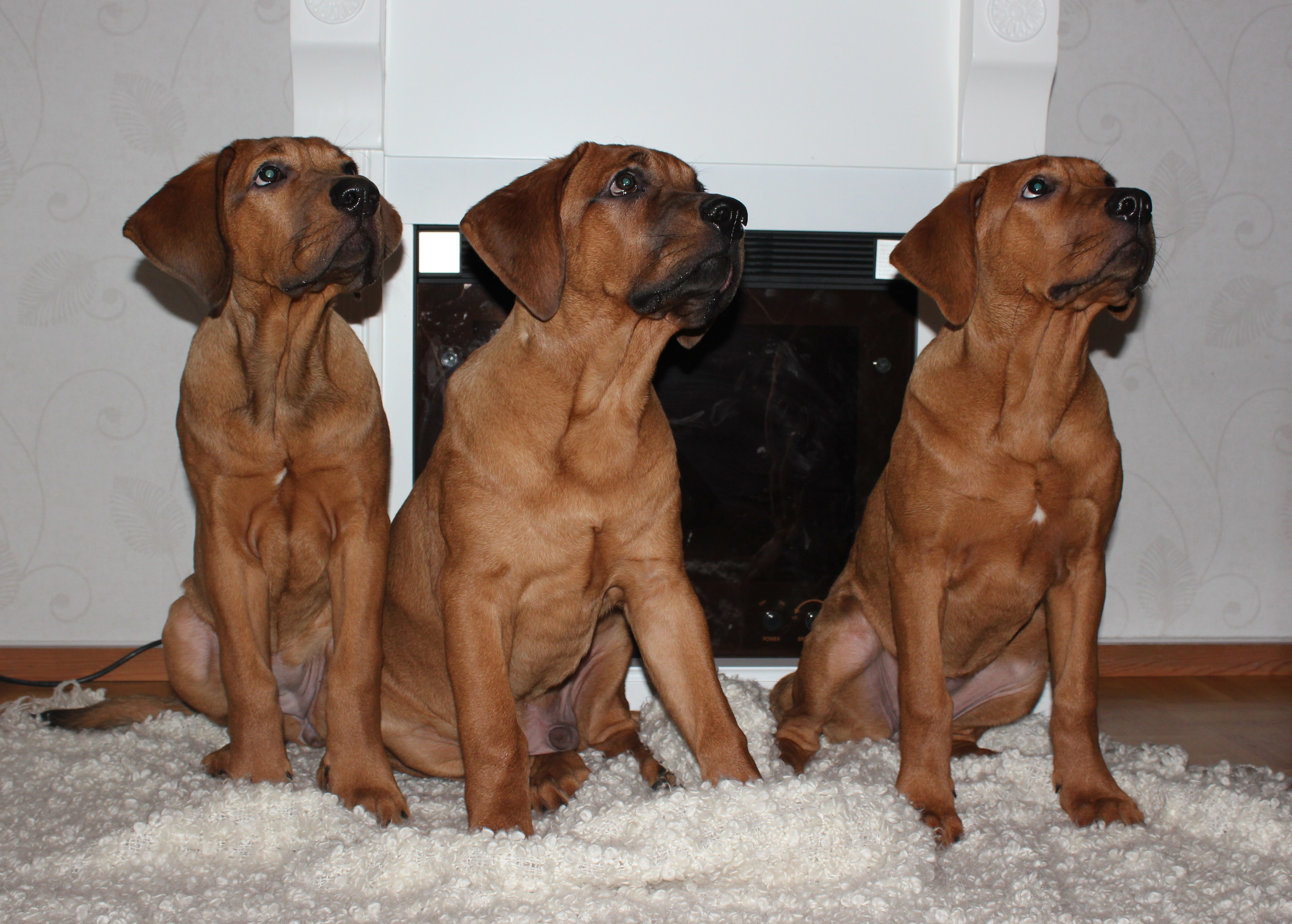
Tosa Inu puppies 4 months

Ownership of Tosas is legally restricted in certain jurisdictions. In the United Kingdom, ownership is regulated under the Dangerous Dogs Act 1991, and in Trinidad and Tobago under the Dog Control Act 2014. A specific exemption from a British court is required to own and import Tosas legally in the UK.

The breed is banned or legally restricted in:

- Australia
- Austria
- Cyprus
- Denmark
- Fiji
- France
- Hong Kong
- Iceland
- Ireland
- Israel
- Malaysia
- Malta
- New Zealand
- Norway
- Romania
- Singapore
- Tunisia
- Turkey
- United Arab Emirates
- United Kingdom

== See also ==
- List of dog breeds
- List of dog fighting breeds
- Breed-specific legislation
