= Boerboel =

South African breed of dog

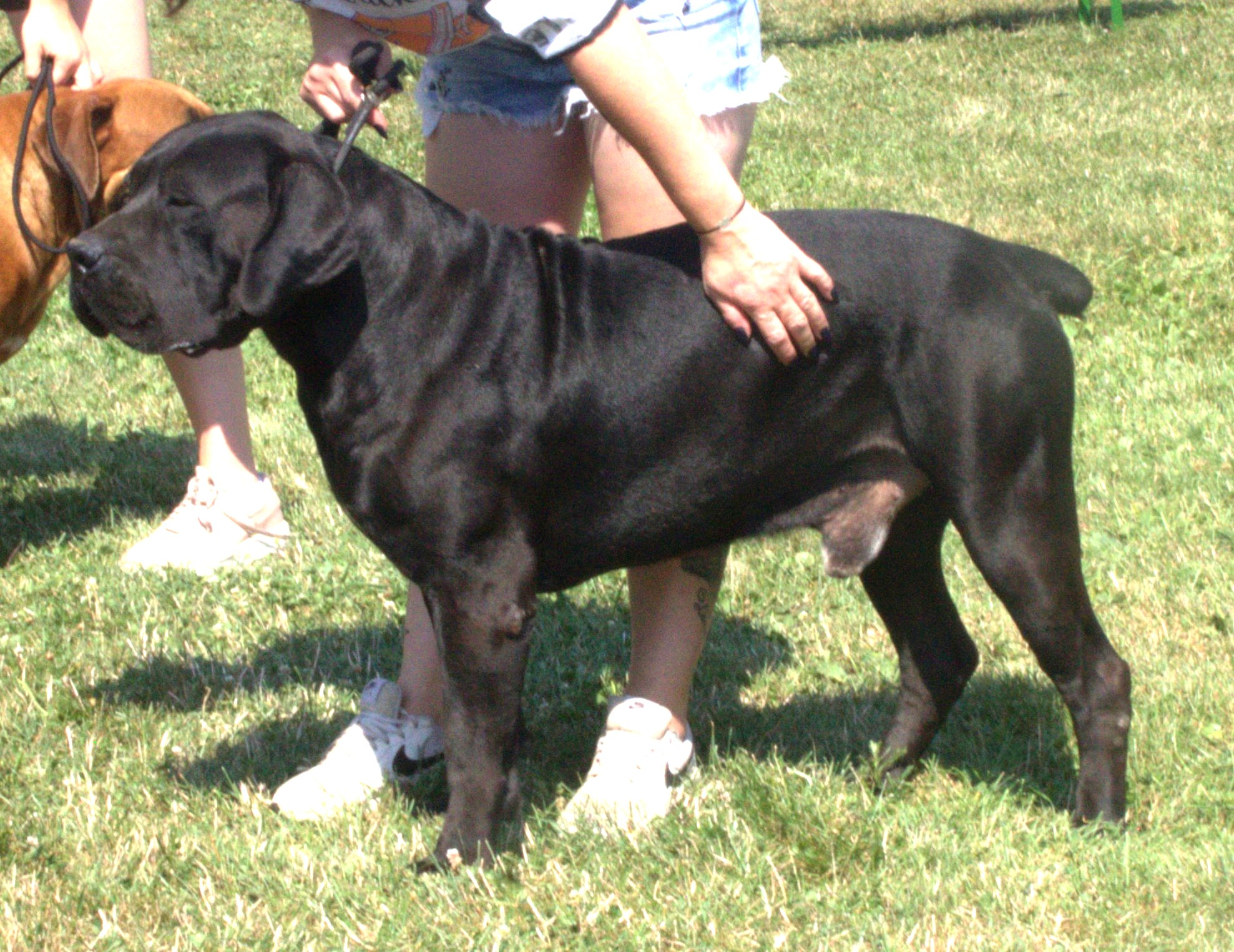
- Other names: South African Mastiff
- Origin: South Africa
- Foundation stock: mastiffs, bulldogs, Boer Dog
Traits
Height	Males	ideal 66 cm (26 in); minimum 60 cm (24 in)
	Females	ideal 61 cm (24 in); minimum 55 cm (22 in)
- Coat: short, smooth
- Colour: red, brown or yellow, either solid or brindled; black (SABBS only)
Kennel club standards
- Kennel Union of Southern Africa: standard
- South African Boerboel Breeders' Society: standard
- Notes: not recognised by the Fédération Cynologique Internationale

The Boerboel (pronounced [ˈbuːrbul]) is a South African breed of large dog of mastiff type, used as a family guard dog. It is large, with a short coat, strong bone structure and well-developed muscles.

It is recognised by the Kennel Union of Southern Africa, but not by the Fédération Cynologique Internationale.

== Legislation ==
In South Africa, the Animal Improvement Act (62 of 1998) defines a breed of animal indigenous to or developed in the republic to be a landrace, therefore the Boerboel is regarded as a landrace in the republic. The Act grants powers to a registered "animal breeders society", and the South African Boerboel Breeders' Society (SABBS) is a registered animal breeders society. The SABBS is the only organisation authorised under the Act to officially register Boerboels. As legally registered custodian of the Boerboel dog breed, SABBS is responsible for the standards that govern identification, recording, evaluation and improvement of the breed. The Kennel Union of Southern Africa recognises that Boerboels were registered on its books.

== History ==
The name Boerboel derives from the Afrikaans words boer, meaning farmer, and boel, a shortening of boelhond, meaning bulldog.

The Boerboel descends from an old colonial cross-breed of mastiffs and bulldogs used both as a guard dog on remote farms and estates and for big game hunting, and known as the Boer Dog or Boer Hunting Dog. An account from 1909 describes this cross-breed as the best dog for hunting leopards and baboons in packs; a leopard with a leg caught in a trap can be killed by a pack of them. The Standard Encyclopaedia of Southern Africa describes the Boer Mastiff as an excellent fighter; one killed leopards in four single combats over a number of years, but was killed by a fifth.

Breeding of the Boerboel began in the 1950s. A breed association, the Suid-Afrikaanse Boerboel Telersvereniging or South African Boerboel Breeders Association, was established in 1983. A new association, the South African Boerboel Breeders' Society, was formed in 2012 and registered with the Department of Agriculture, Forestry and Fisheries in 2014.

== Characteristics ==
The Boerboel is a large dog, with a strong bone structure and well-developed muscles. The head is large and the muzzle is short.

The coat is short and sleek with dense hair coverage. The recognised colours are brindle, fawn, and brown; it may or may not have a black mask. There is one minor divergence between breed standards; the Kennel Union of South Africa does not accept black but SABBS does.

The dogs show courage when threatened; they may display aggression toward other dogs or strangers.

== Health ==
The Boerboel may develop hip or elbow dysplasia, vaginal hyperplasia, ectropion and entropion. Juvenile epilepsy (with attacks brought on by metabolic changes or stress) has been observed.

== Restrictions ==
Ownership of the dog is restricted or banned in many countries, among them Bermuda, Denmark, the Faroe Islands, France, Mauritius, Qatar, Tunisia and the Turks and Caicos islands.
