= Moscow Watchdog =

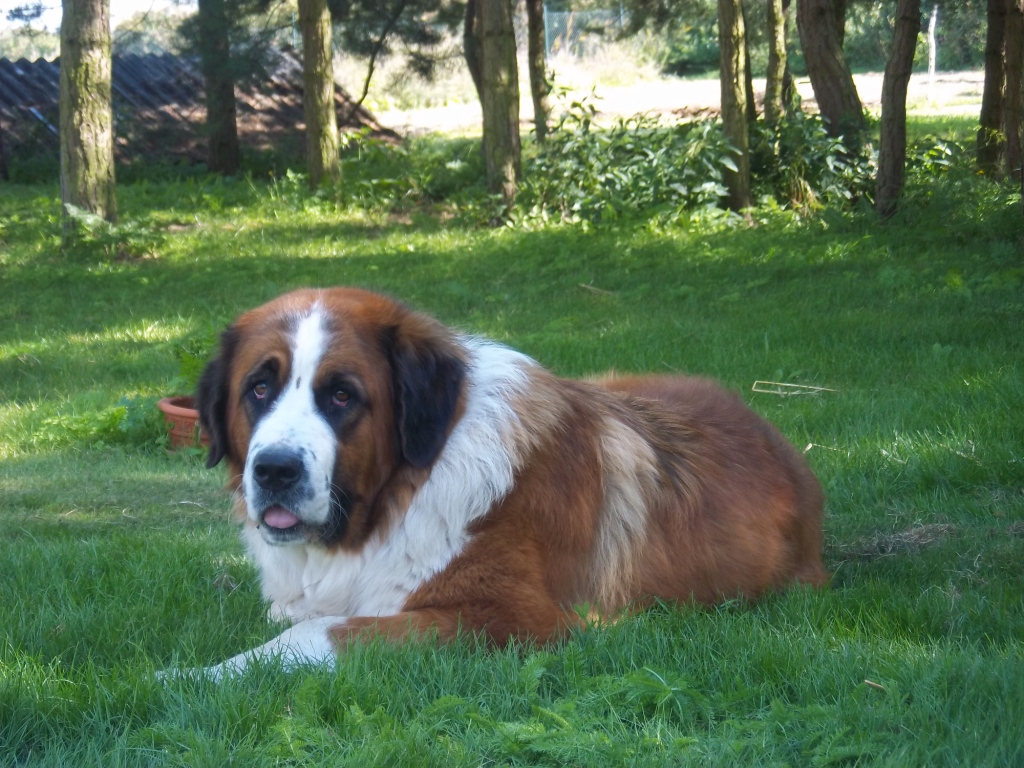
- Moscow Watchdog
- Other names: Moskovskaya Storozhevaya Sobaka
- Origin: Soviet Union
Traits
| Height | Males | 77-78 cm |
| | Females | 72-73cm |
| Weight | Males | 55 kg+ |
| | Females | 45 kg+ |
- Color: Red-piebald, spotted: white with red spots, red-black, black-red, sable

The Moscow Watchdog (Russian: московская сторожевая, tr. moskovskaya storozhevaya) is a guard dog developed in the former Soviet Union, now Russia. It descends from crosses between the St. Bernard, the Caucasian Shepherd Dog and the Russian Pinto Hound. It contains the physical size, attractiveness and intelligence of a St. Bernard and the awareness and assertive traits of a Caucasian Shepherd Dog.

== Appearance ==
The Moscow Watchdog is known to be a large powerful breed with a gentle and obedient temperament.

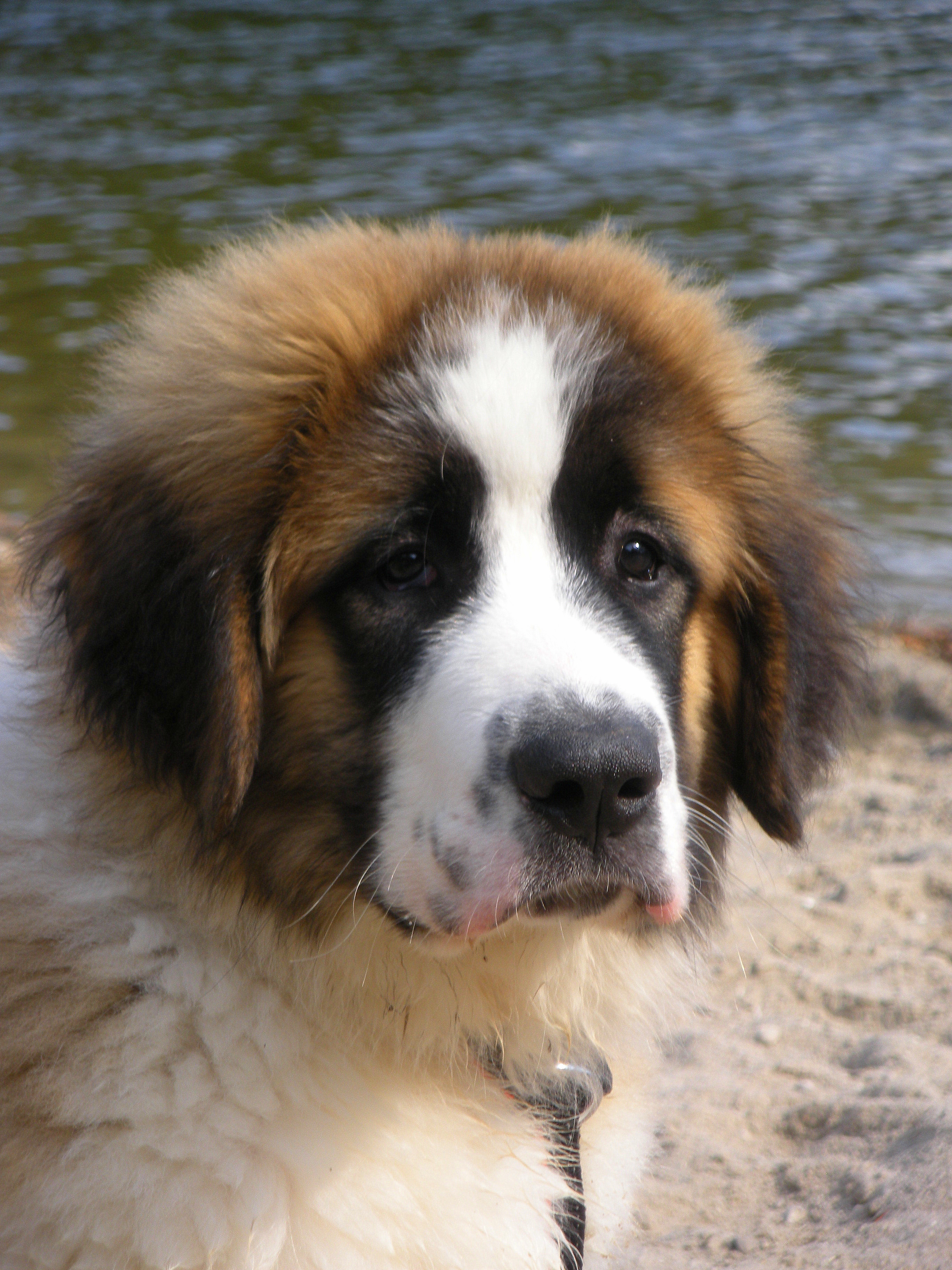
A Moscow Watchdog puppy with characteristic black facial mask

Moscow Watchdogs stand at least 68 centimetres (27 in) tall and 66 centimetres (26 in) in females but the ideal heights is at least 77–78 centimetres (30–31 in) in males, 72–73 centimetres (28–29 in) in females. The breed should weigh at least 55 kilograms (121 lb) in males and 45 kilograms (99 lb) in females. Their coat is a dense, double coat capable of withstanding extreme cold. Coat color can be red piebald, white with red spots, red-black, black-red, or sable spots, with a black mask on the head.

== Temperament ==
The Moscow Watchdog is self-confident and balanced in temperament, but it requires training and early socialization with both people and animals. As a companion, the Moscow Watchdog is known to be a gentle giant, assertive and protective of his or her family when in danger. Raised properly with training and discipline, the Moscow Watchdog adapts easily to any environment and is a perfect protective family pet.

== History ==
=== Russia ===
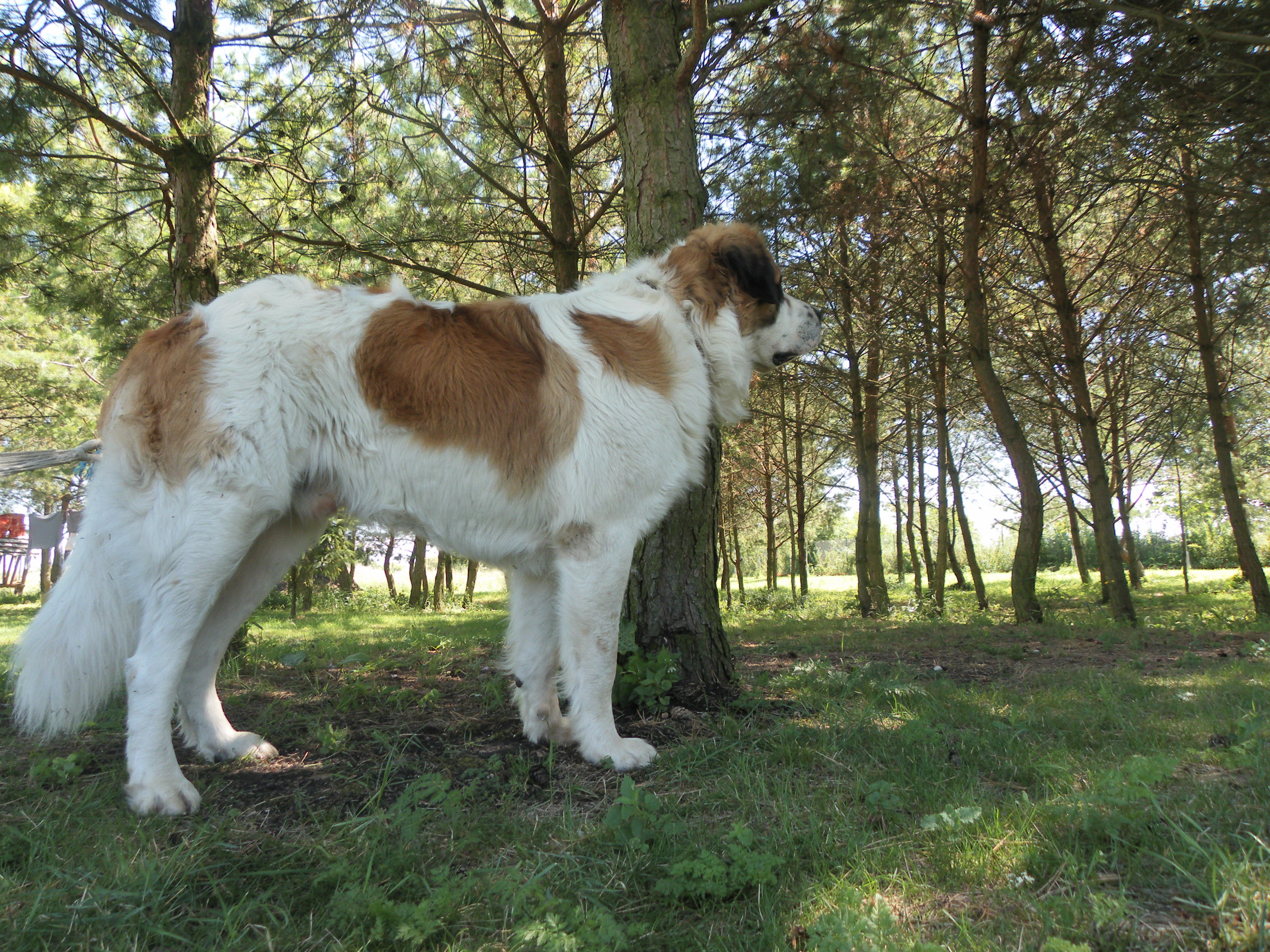
Moscow Watchdog standing in a forest

Following World War II, loss of working dogs and rising crime created a demand in the Soviet Union for a guard dog that was cold tolerant down to −30 – −40 °C (−22 – −40 °F) and highly adaptable to different structures and environments, such as warehouses, railroads, labor camps and infrastructure. In response to this demand. the Central School of Military Dog Breeding, a department of the USSR Ministry of Defense, developed the Russian Watchdog using crosses between Caucasian Shepherd Dogs, St. Bernards and Russian Pinto Hounds. In 1958, the first breed standard was published. The Central School of Military Dog Breeding, today known as the 470th Methodological and Canine Center, continues to breed Moscow watchdogs today.

In 1992, the breed standard was approved by the Federation of the Dog Breeders of Russia and in 1997, by the Department of Animal Breeding and Pedigree of the Ministry of Agriculture of Russia. The standard was also approved by the Russian Kennel Club in 1997.

The Russian Kennel Club is working with the International Kennel Federation (FCI) to gain official recognition. Currently, the Moscow Watchdog is considered by the FCI as part of the 2nd group Molosser. In FCI sanctioned dog shows, they are shown in what is referred to as a "Special Show." Inside Russia, they are widely shown and a recognized breed.

=== Outside of Russia ===
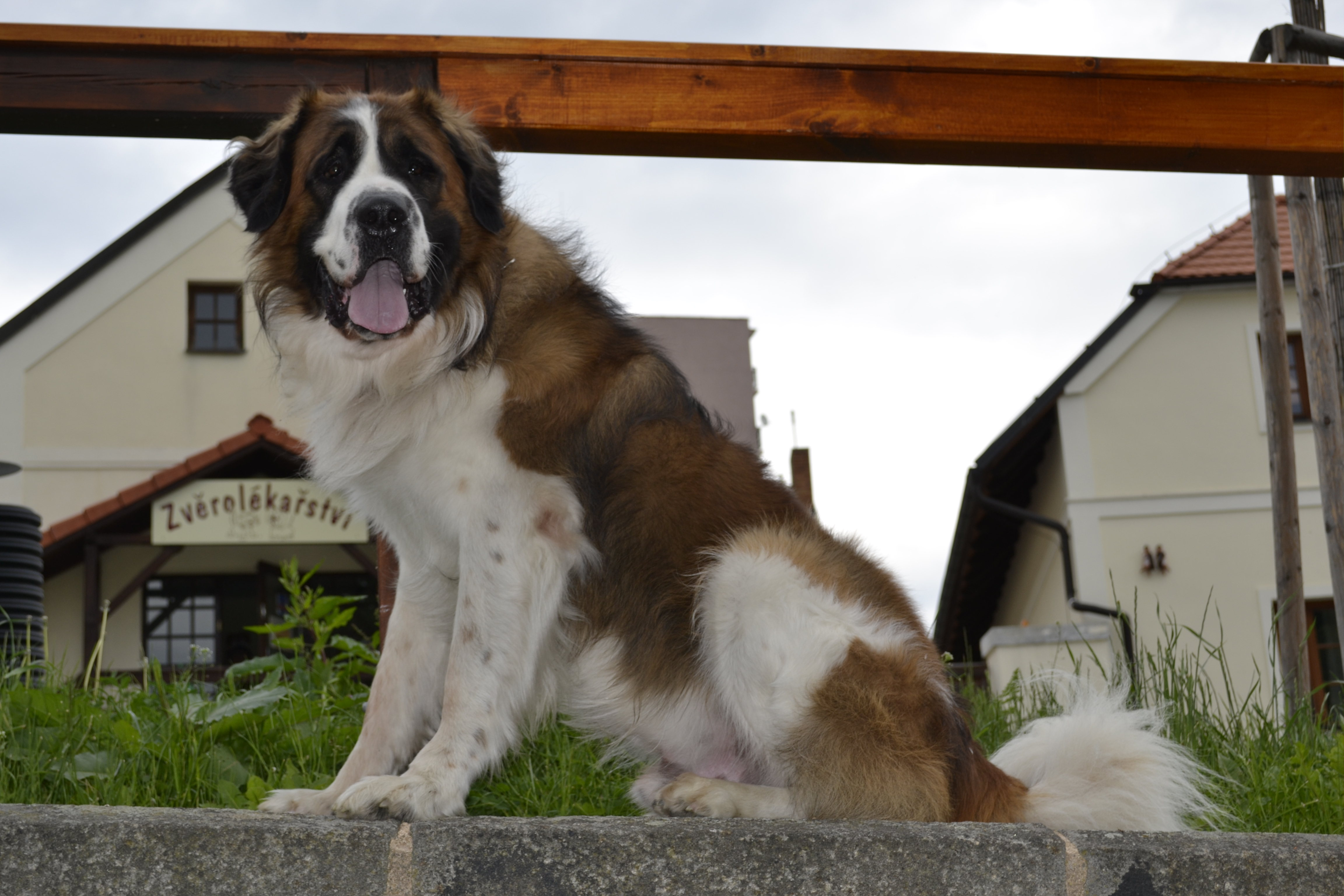
A Moscow Watchdog in the Czech Republic

Until recently, Moscow Watchdogs were uncommon outside of Russia and the former Soviet states; however, they are now becoming more popular in Europe. In 1986, the first few Moscow watchdogs were brought to Hungary for breeders to help popularize the breed. Future growth was guaranteed by devoted breeders and also the breed owner, Club Karakán. In addition, dozens of breeders from the former Soviet states had also worked with the breed to ensure their existence for the future. Currently, around 500 Moscow Watchdogs can be found in Hungary. The first litter of Moscow Watchdogs was born in the US on June 6, 2015. There are currently 27 Moscow Watchdogs living in the United States.

== See also ==
- List of dog breeds
