= South Russian Ovcharka =

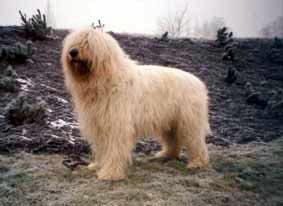
- Other names: Youjnorousskaïa Ovtcharka; South Russian Sheepdog; Ukrainian Ovcharka; Yuzhak; South Ukrainian Ovcharka; South Russian Shepherd Dog
- Origin: Russian Empire; Soviet Union; Ukraine; Russia
Traits
Height	Males	minimum 66 cm
	Females	minimum 62 cm
Weight	Males	minimum 35 kg
	Females	minimum 30 kg
Kennel club standards
- Fédération Cynologique Internationale: standard

The South Russian Ovcharka (Note: Russian: Южнорусская овчарка, romanized: yuzhnorusskaya ovcharka) or South Russian Shepherd Dog is breed of flock guardian dog. It developed in the areas of the Russian Empire and the Soviet Union that are now Ukraine and southern Russia, and is thought to derive from cross-breeding between local dogs of the Russian steppes and long-haired shepherd dogs brought to the area from Spain in the late eighteenth century together with Merino sheep. These may have been similar in appearance to the present-day Gos d'Atura Catala.

== History ==
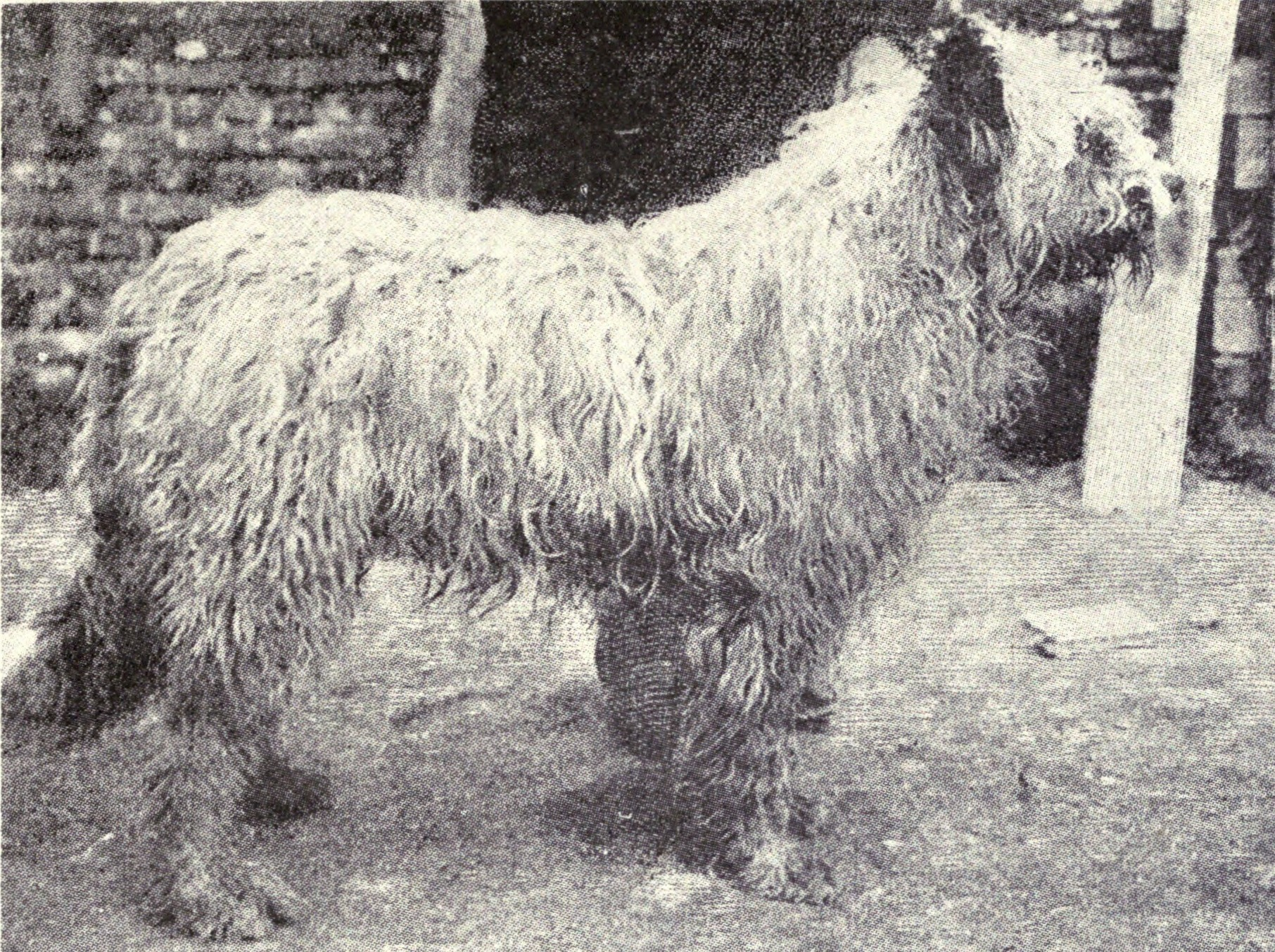
Image from about 1915

The South Russian Ovcharka is thought to derive from cross-breeding between local dogs – of both flock guardian and sighthound type – of the Russian steppes and long-haired shepherd dogs brought to the area from Spain in the late eighteenth century together with Merino sheep. These Spanish dogs may have been similar in appearance to the present-day Gos d'Atura Catala. A cross-bred dog of this South Russian type won a gold medal at the Exposition Universelle of 1867 in Paris.

Much of the selective breeding and development of the breed took place in the early twentieth century, on the estates of Friedrich von Falz-Fein at Askania-Nova, now in Kherson Oblast, Ukraine. The breed standard was approved early in the 1930s.

The Fédération Cynologique Internationale definitively accepted it on 30 September 1983 as the Yuzhnorusskaya Ovcharka or South Russian Shepherd Dog.

== Characteristics ==
It is a large dog: dogs stand no less than 66 cm at the withers and weigh at least 35 kg; bitches are about 4 cm smaller and weigh some 5 kg less. Some dogs are very large, with weights of up to 75 kg. The head is long and of wedge shape; the ears are pendent and triangular. The coat is long, coarse and thick. It may be solid white, grey or pale ivory; or white with tinges of yellow, or white with patches of grey, pale ivory or wheat colour.

== Legislation ==
The dog is banned in Denmark.
