= Sheep dog =

Breed of working dog used to control sheep

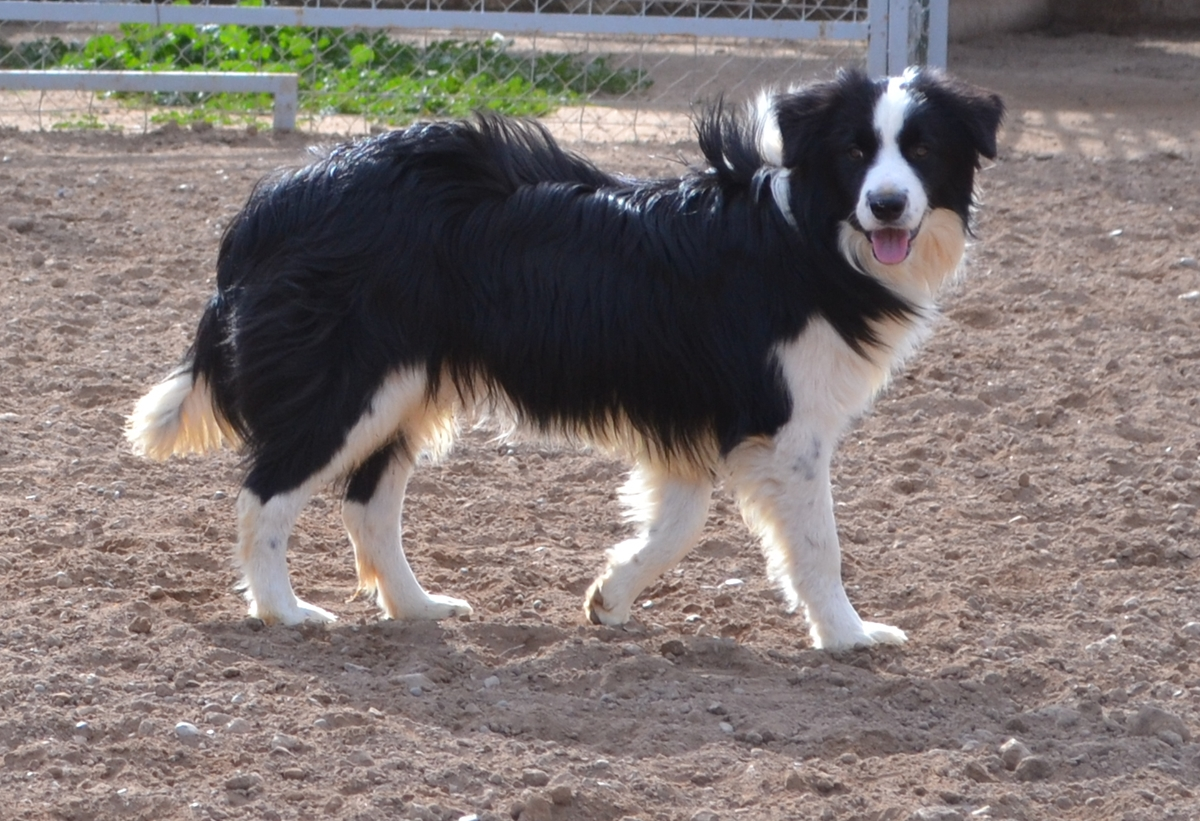
A Border Collie

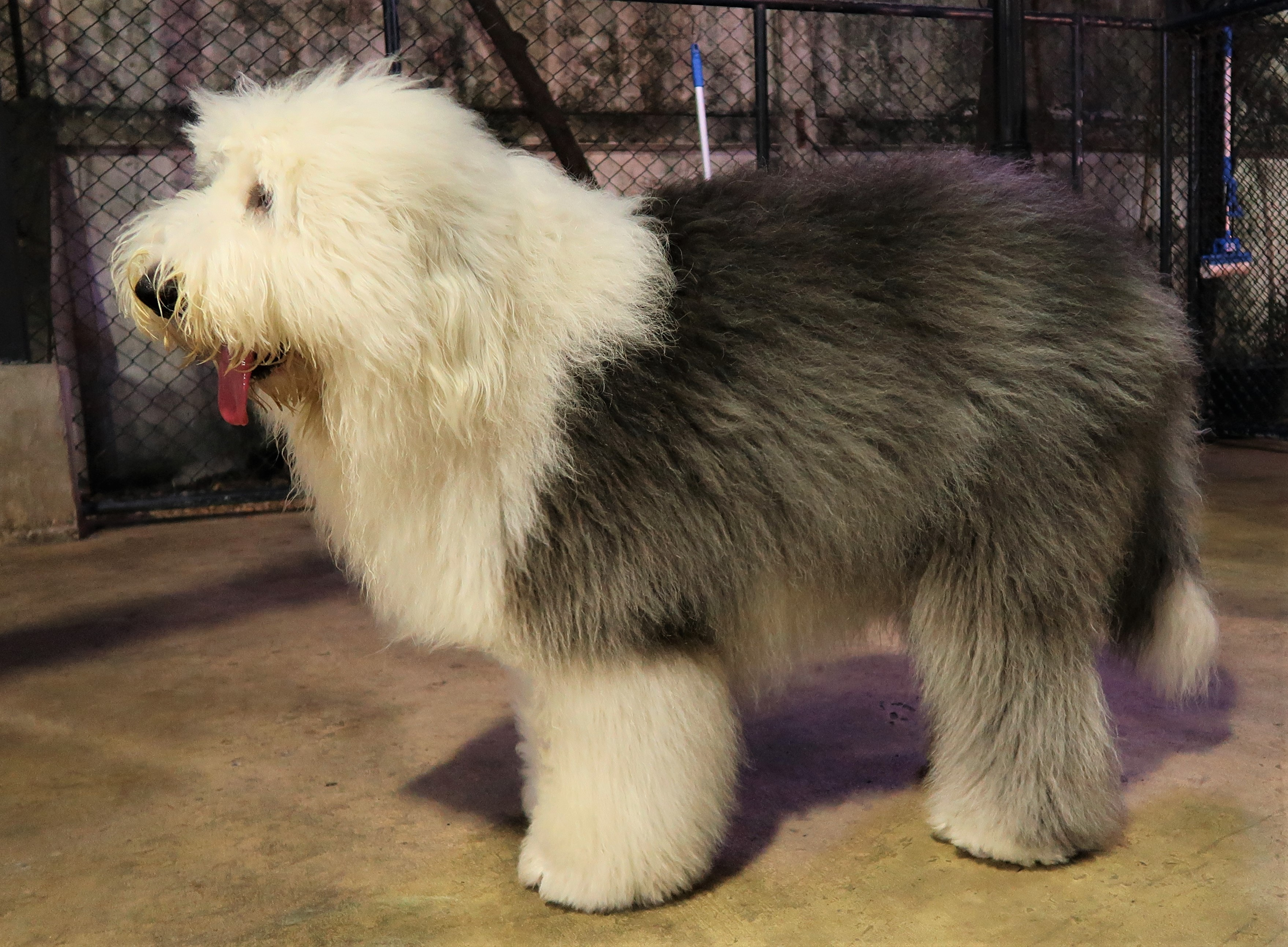
An Old English Sheepdog

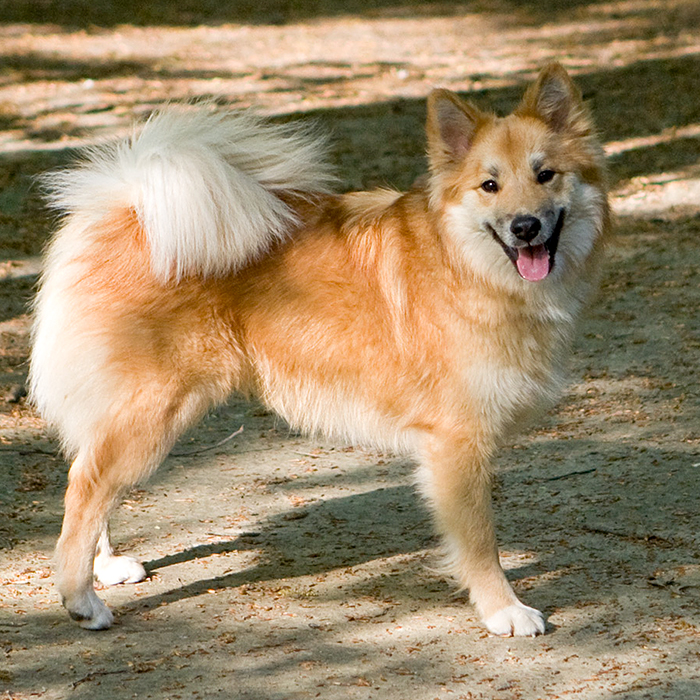
An Icelandic Sheepdog

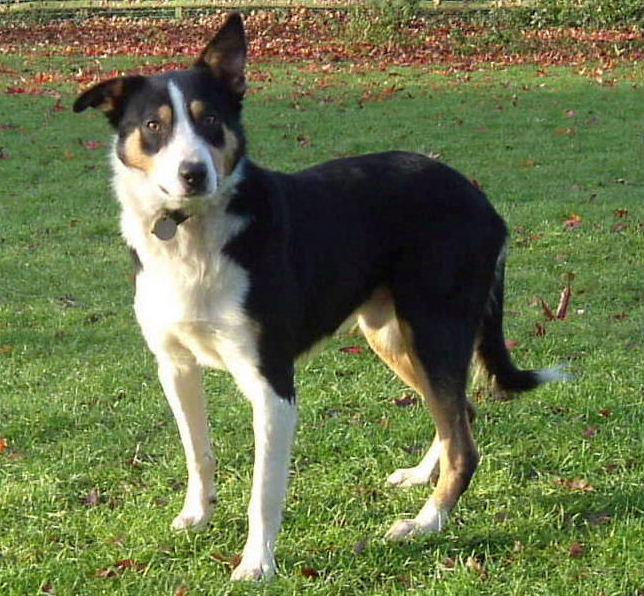
A Welsh Sheepdog

A sheep dog, sheepdog, shepherd dog or simply shepherd is generally a dog or breed of dogs historically used in connection with the raising of sheep. These include livestock guardian dogs used to guard sheep and other livestock and herding dogs used to move, manage and control sheep and other livestock.

The Fédération Cynologique Internationale has grouped Sheepdogs and Cattledogs (except Swiss Cattledogs) in Group 1.

== List of herding breeds ==
Name	Origin	Recognition	Other Names	Image
Australian Cattle Dog	Australia	FCI, AKC		
Australian Kelpie	Australia	FCI, AKC (divided into Australian Kelpie and Working Kelpie)		
Australian Shepherd	USA	FCI, AKC		
Basque Shepherd Dog	France, Spain	RSCFRCE		
Bearded Collie	UK	FCI, AKC		
Beauceron	France	FCI, AKC		
Belgian Shepherd Groenendael	Belgium	FCI, AKC		
Belgian Shepherd Laekenois	Belgium	FCI, AKC		
Belgian Shepherd Malinois	Belgium	FCI, AKC		
Belgian Shepherd Tervuren	Belgium	FCI, AKC		
Bergamasco Shepherd Dog	Italy	FCI, AKC		
Berger Blanc Suisse	Switzerland	FCI		
Berger Picard	France	FCI, AKC		
Border Collie	UK	FCI, AKC		
Bouvier des Flandres	Belgium	FCI, AKC		
Briard	France	FCI, AKC		
Can de Chira	Spain			
Can de Palleiro	Spain			
Cão da Serra de Aires	Portugal	FCI		
Carea Castellano Manchego	Spain			
Carea Leonés	Spain	RSCFRCE		
Catahoula Leopard Dog	USA	AKC, UKC		
Catalan Sheepdog	Spain	FCI		
Chiribaya Dog	Peru			
Croatian Sheepdog	Croatia	FCI, AKC		
Cumberland Sheepdog	England			
Dutch Shepherd	Netherlands	FCI, AKC		
English Shepherd	USA	UKC		
Finnish Lapphund	Finland	FCI, AKC	Reindeer	
Garafian Shepherd	Spain	RSCFRCE		
Gaucho sheepdog	Brazil	CBKC		
German Shepherd	Germany	FCI, AKC		
Huntaway	New Zealand	NZKC		
Icelandic Sheepdog	Iceland	FCI, AKC		
Komondor	Hungary	FCI, AKC		
Koolie	Australia			
Lancashire Heeler	England	FCI, AKC		
Lapponian Herder	Finland	FCI, AKC	Reindeer	
McNab	USA			
Miniature American Shepherd	USA	FCI, AKC		
Mudi	Hungary	FCI, AKC		
New Zealand Heading Dog	New Zealand			
Norwegian Buhund	Norway	FCI, AKC		
Old English Sheepdog	England	FCI, AKC		
Pastore della Lessinia e del Lagorai	Italy			
Patagonian Sheepdog	Chile	Kennel Club de Chile		
Polish Lowland Sheepdog	Poland	FCI, AKC		
Puli	Hungary	FCI, AKC		
Pumi	Hungary	FCI, AKC		
Pyrenean Shepherd	France	FCI, AKC		
Rottweiler	Germany	FCI, AKC (Working group)		
Rough Collie	Scotland	FCI, AKC		
Schapendoes	Netherlands	FCI, AKC		
Schipperke	Belgium	FCI, AKC		
Shetland Sheepdog	Scotland	FCI, AKC		
Slovak Cuvac	Slovakia	FCI, AKC		
Small Međimurje Dog	Croatia	Croatian Kennel Club		
Smithfield	England			
Smooth Collie	Scotland	FCI, AKC		
Swedish Lapphund	Sweden	FCI	Reindeer	
Swedish Vallhund	Sweden	FCI, AKC	Cattle	
Tornjak	Bosnia and Herzegovina, Croatia	FCI, AKC		
Welsh Corgi Cardigan	Wales	FCI, AKC	Cattle	
Welsh Corgi Pembroke	Wales	FCI, AKC	Cattle	
Welsh Sheepdog	Wales			

== Livestock guardian dog breeds ==
- Aidi
- Akbash dog
- Aksaray Malaklisi
- Anatolian Shepherd
- Armenian Gampr
- Bakharwal dog
- Bucovina Shepherd
- Cão de Castro Laboreiro
- Cão de Gado Transmontano
- Carpathian Shepherd Dog
- Caucasian Shepherd Dog
- Central Asian Shepherd Dog
- Estrela Mountain Dog
- Georgian Shepherd
- Great Pyrenees
- Greek Shepherd
- Gurdbasar
- Himalayan Sheepdog
- Kangal Shepherd
- Karakachan
- Kars
- Karst Shepherd
- Komondor
- Koyun dog
- Kuchi
- Kuvasz
- Maremmano-Abruzzese Sheepdog
- Mioritic Shepherd
- Persian Mastiff
- Polish Tatra Sheepdog
- Pshdar dog
- Pyrenean Mastiff
- Rafeiro do Alentejo
- Romanian Raven Shepherd Dog
- Sardinian Shepherd Dog
- Šarplaninac
- Slovak Cuvac
- Spanish Mastiff
- Tibetan kyi apso
- Tibetan Mastiff
- Tobet
- Tornjak
- Vikhan Sheepdog

== See also ==
- Droving
- Guard llama
- Livestock guardian dog
- Sheepdog trial
