= Street dogs in Bucharest =

Stray animals in Bucharest

In Bucharest – the capital city of Romania – the problem of stray dogs (maidanezi in Romanian) has been acknowledged for decades. The number of stray dogs has been reduced drastically since 2014, following the death of a four-year-old child who was attacked by a dog. In 2015, the Bucharest City Hall stated that over 51,200 stray dogs were captured between October 2013 and January 2015, with more than half being euthanized, about 23,000 being adopted, and 2,000 still residing in the municipality's shelters. The issue has not only been a heated subject of debate in Bucharest, but also on a nationwide scale.

While the problem of stray dogs has been largely solved in Bucharest itself, there are still dogs on the outskirts of the city, in the surrounding Ilfov county. In Ilfov county, the county which surrounds Bucharest, and consists of small towns, villages, fields and forests, stray dogs continue to roam.

Many stray dogs from Romania are adopted abroad, especially to the United Kingdom.

== Background ==
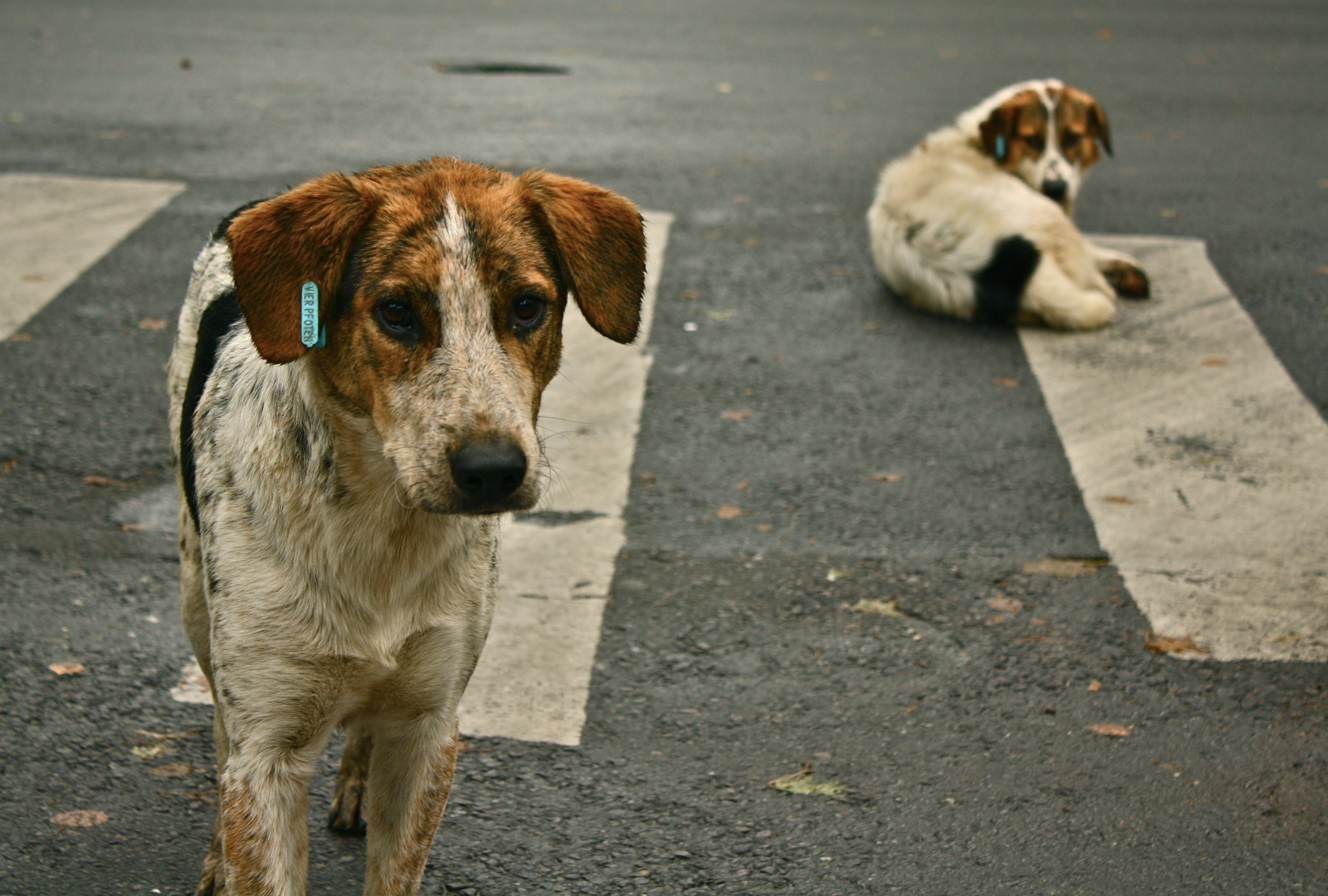
Stray dogs using a crosswalk in Bucharest, late 2011

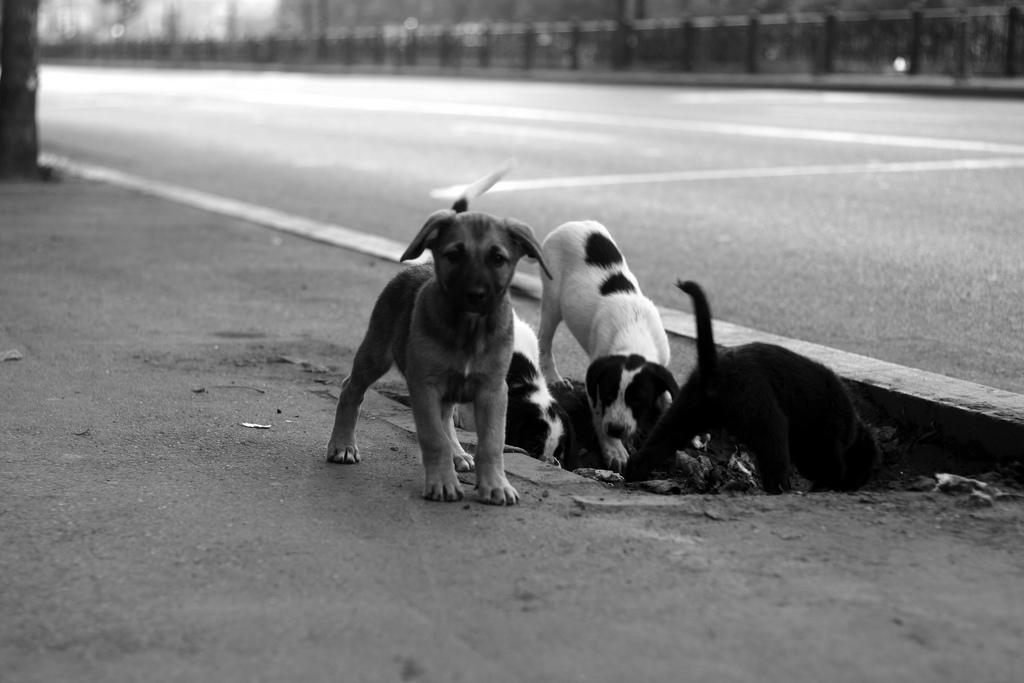
Feral puppies in Bucharest in 2008

The problem has arisen as a result of systematization, a policy imposed during the Communist regime that ruled Romania for decades. Systematization forced people to move into apartment blocks and abandon their dogs.

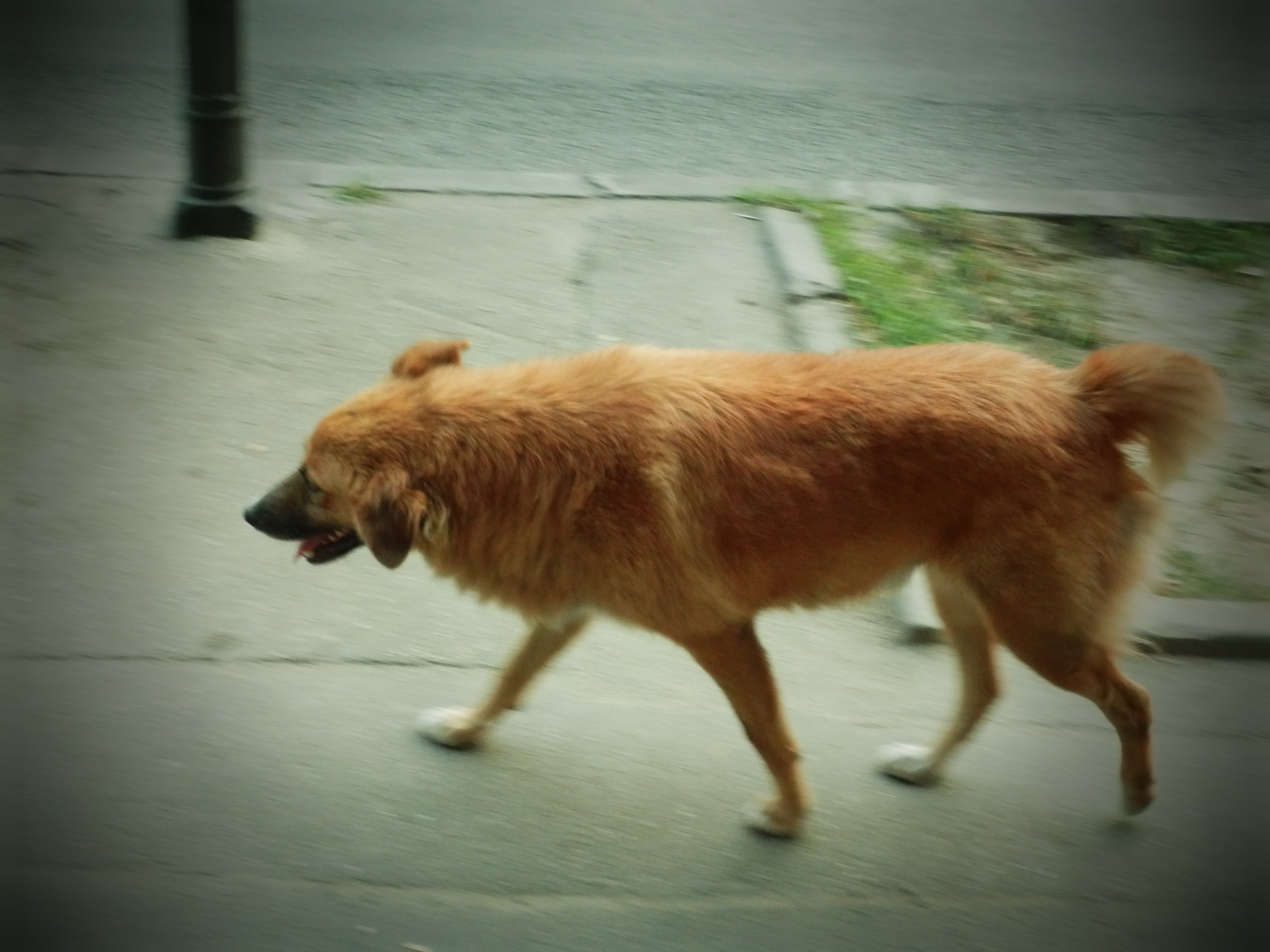
A street dog in Bucharest in 2013

Street dogs in Romania are mongrel dogs, and may have admixture from Romanian guard dog breeds, such as Carpathian Shepherd Dog, Bucovina Shepherd Dog, Romanian Mioritic Shepherd Dog and Romanian Raven Shepherd Dog.

The problem of stray dogs escalated in 2004, when the legislative framework that allowed the euthanasia of unclaimed stray dogs was repealed.

On 10 September 2013, the Parliament of Romania approved the Stray Dogs Euthanasia Law with an absolute majority.

On 24 September 2013, the Constitutional Court of Romania deemed the law to be in compliance with the Constitution of Romania.

On 25 September 2013, the President of Romania Traian Băsescu signed the Stray Dogs Euthanasia Law.

Prior to 25 September 2013, the legislative framework of Romania made it difficult to euthanize unclaimed stray dogs. The standard procedure stated that stray dogs were to be captured by an animal control officer. The dogs would then be taken to animal shelters operated independently by animal rights NGOs. At the shelter, the dogs were due to be sterilized and – if no one legally adopted them – they would be sent back on the streets or sent abroad for adoption.

== Incidents ==
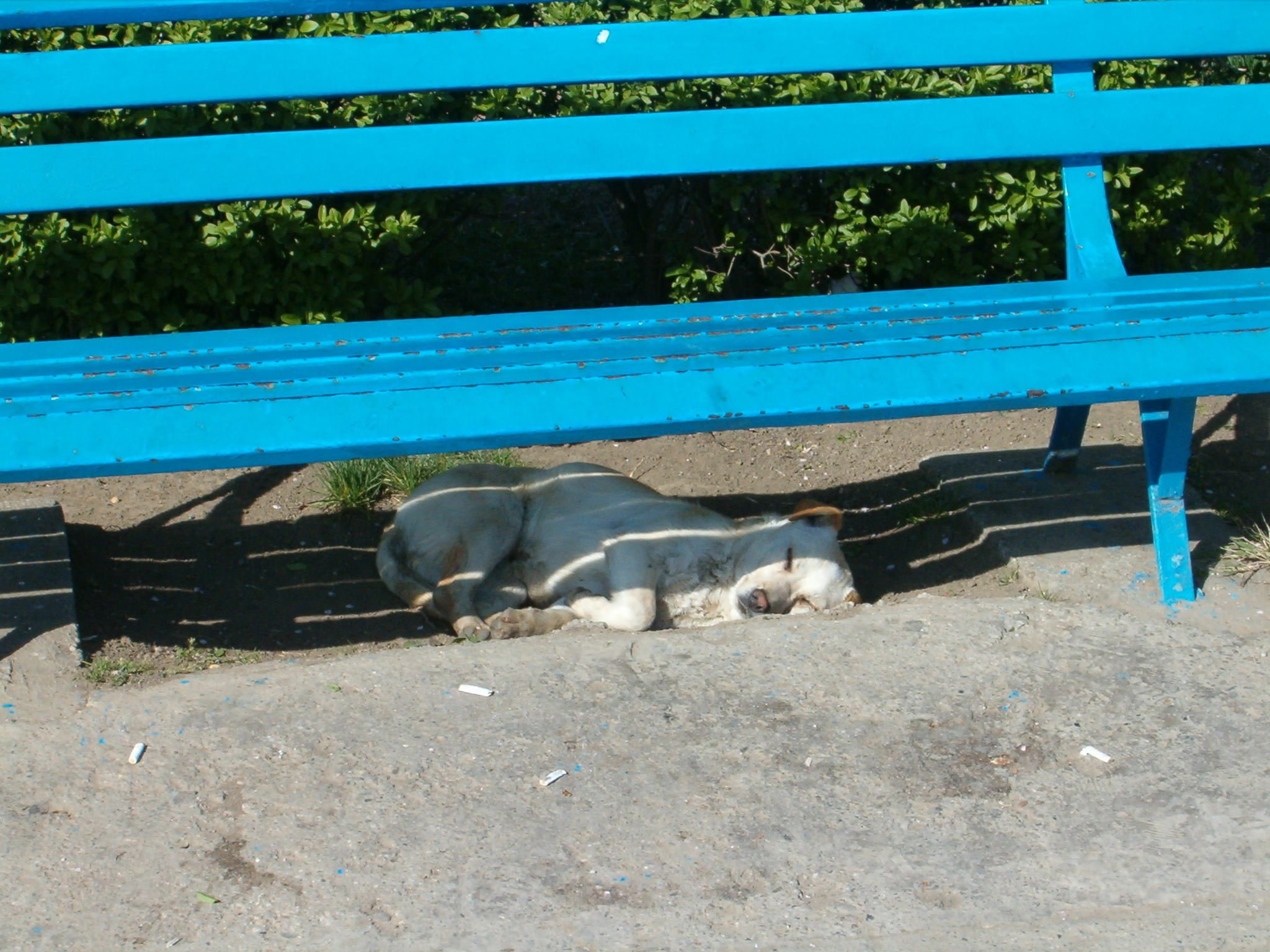
A stray dog sleeping under a bench in 2008, in Bucharest

Until the mid-2010s, dog bites occurred on a regular basis as a result of the stray dog situation. In 2012 alone, 16,192 people were bitten by dogs in Bucharest. Out of these, 3,300 were children.

At least three deaths have occurred in Bucharest as a result of dog packs biting citizens. Those who died were either elderly or children.

The issue of stray dogs gained international attention in 2006, when a Japanese citizen was bitten by dogs on Victory Square. The man died as a result of hemorrhagic shock caused by one of the many dog bites that severed an artery. The dog that was determined to have bitten the man was adopted by a German family and died of old age in April 2013.

In January 2011, a Romanian woman was lethally bitten by a dog. She died as a result of hemorrhagic shock, also caused by a dog bite that severed an artery.

=== Death of Ionuț Anghel ===
The situation escalated rapidly on 2 September 2013, when a four-year-old boy was attacked by a stray dog in the proximity of a park in Bucharest. The event caused an instant outcry in the Romanian society. His death led to a series of changes in the legislative framework that allowed the euthanasia of stray dogs in an easier manner.

The child was playing together with his six-year-old brother, away from adult supervision. The two children were playing near private property, when a pack of dogs suddenly attacked the young boy. Since there were no adults around, his six-year-old brother ran away to get help from his grandmother (the woman was looking after them). By the time the grandmother arrived at the scene together with the police, the boy was found dead and disfigured in a bush.

Two days later, it was revealed that the dog that bit the child was registered to an animal rights NGO.

The reactions to his death were almost unanimously that of shock. The accident was listed as breaking news on news channels in Romania for multiple days. Protests were organized – both in favor of and against – the stray dogs euthanasia laws. After the mauling incident, gruesome retaliatory acts against stray dogs were reported — including disfigurement and burning puppies to death.

The then President of Romania Traian Băsescu urged the legislature to establish a set of laws urgently. The Prime Minister of Romania stated that he would support the Stray Dogs Euthanasia Law. As a result of the death, an investigation was started; those found guilty by a court of law will be sanctioned according to penal law.

== Ilfov county ==
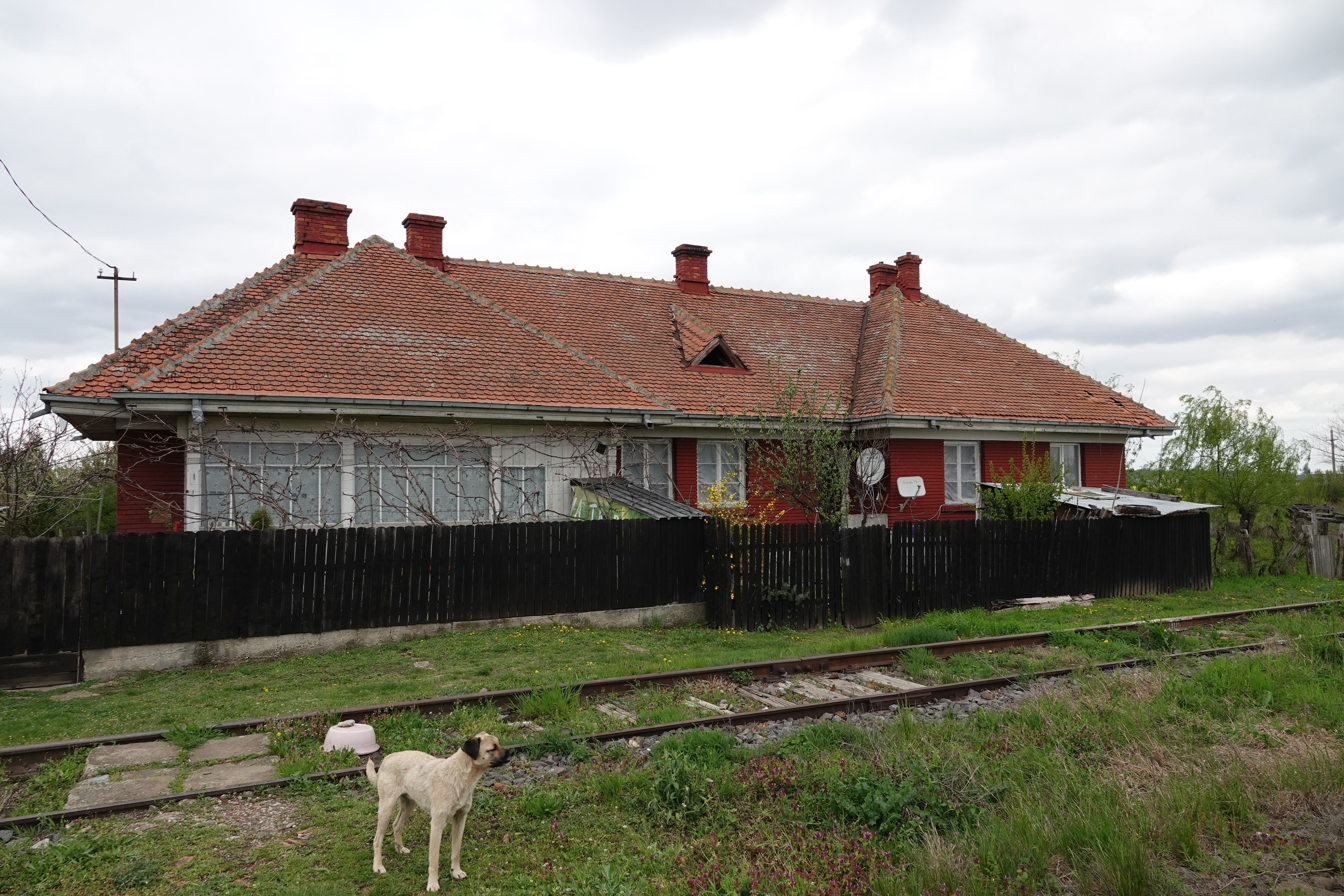
A stray dog in Moara Vlăsiei, in Ilfov County (the county that surrounds Bucharest)

The area surrounding the city of Bucharest continues to struggle with stray dogs. The problems escalated in January 2023, when a woman who was jogging in a field near Lacul Morii, near Chiajna, was attacked and killed by dogs. Following this incident, the authorities in Ilfov county have started a program to monitor all dogs from the area.

== Across the country ==
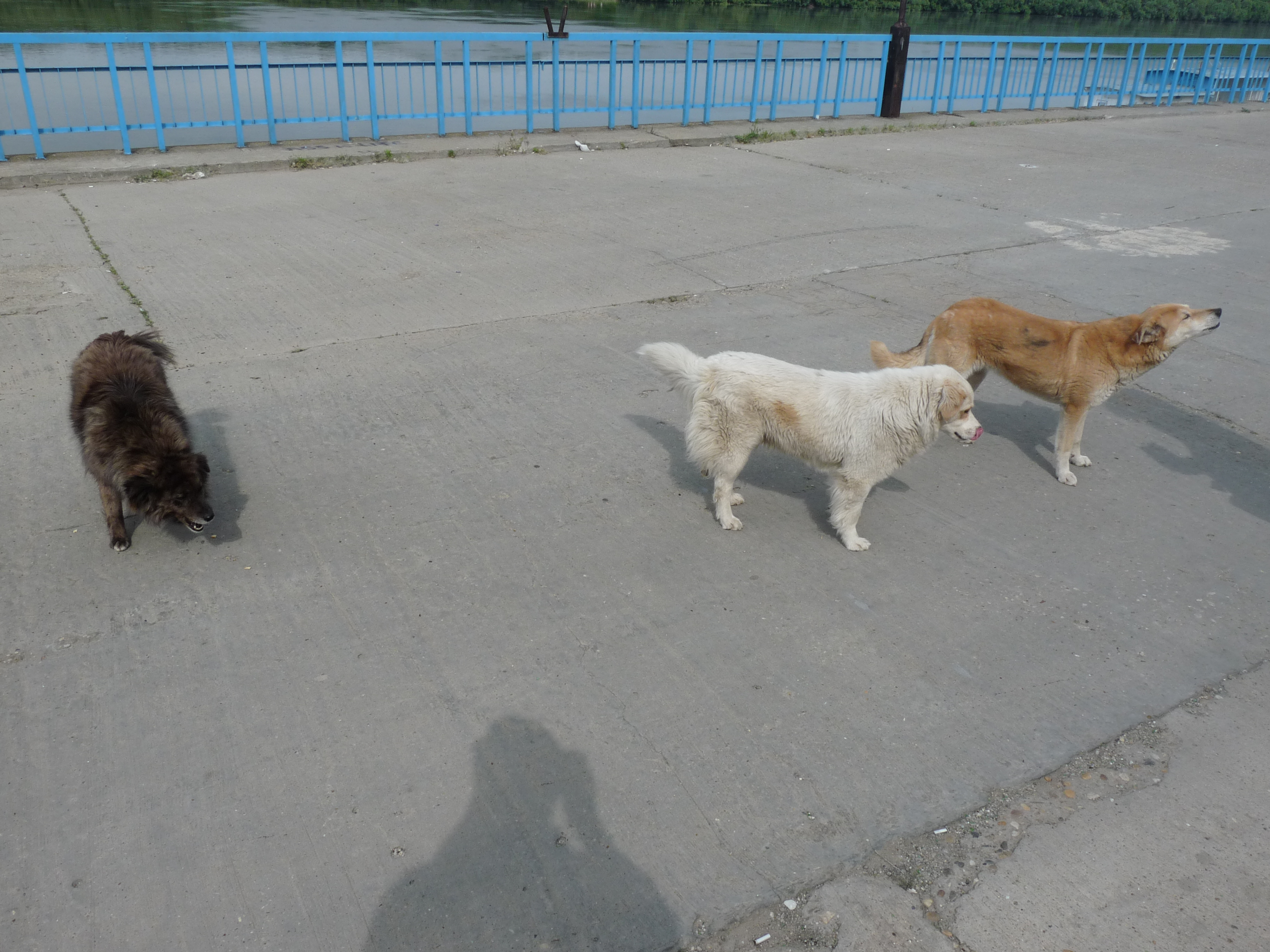
Stray dogs in Cernavodă

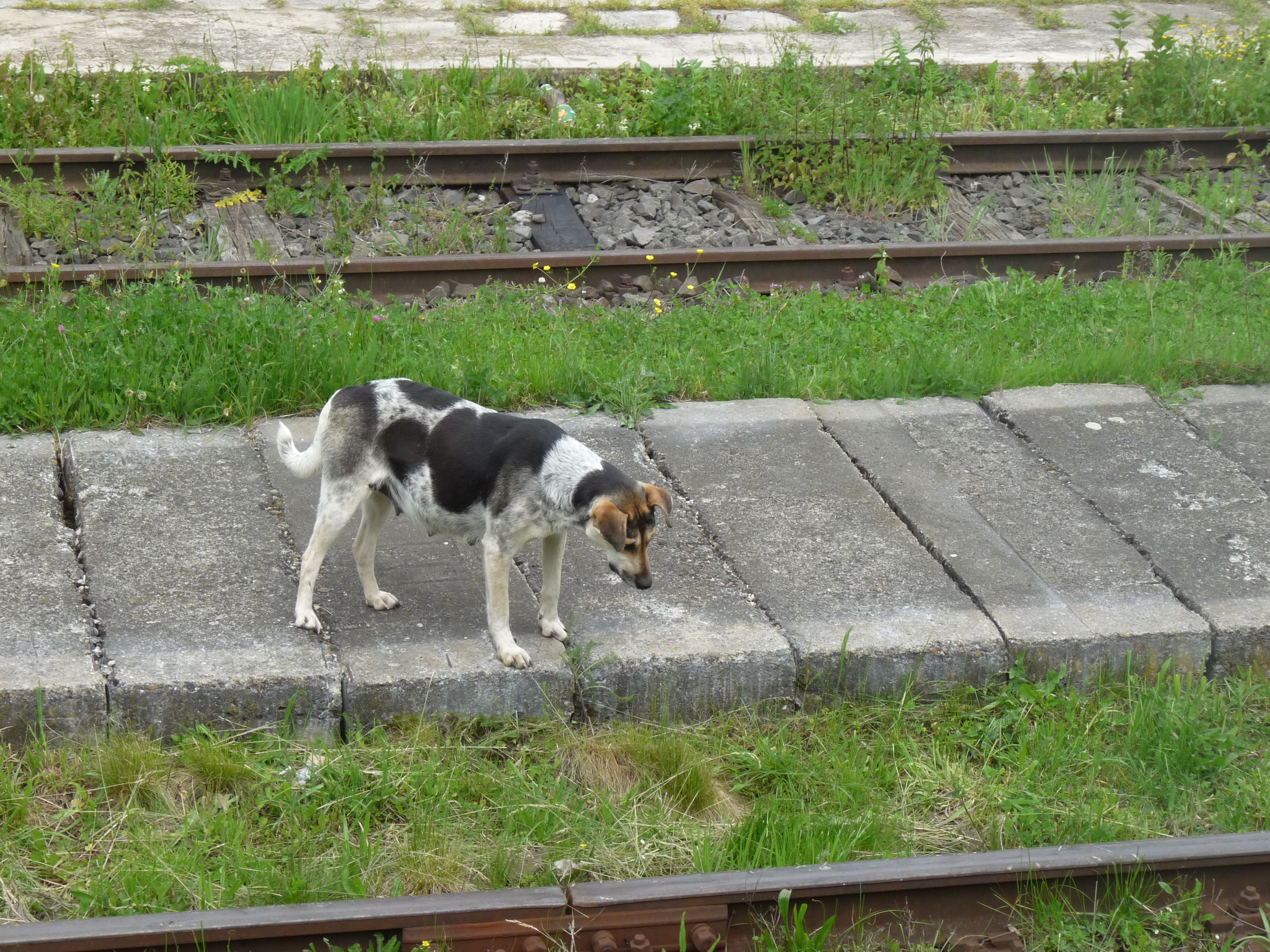
A stray dog in Săliște

Stray dogs are present in many parts of Romania, although there is no official data on their numbers. While most big cities have tackled the problem, feral dogs often roam on the side of the roads of the country, in the fields and in forests. PETA UK stated (in 2018) that there were 600,000 stray dogs in Romania. Many Romanian stray dogs are adopted abroad. During the first half of 2023, 26,723 dogs were sent to other European Union countries (most common countries being Germany (18,502), Netherlands (2,064) and Belgium (1,525)), and 7,002 dogs were sent to the United Kingdom.

There have been several deaths due to stray dogs attacks in recent years, including a 6-year-old girl who was killed by stray dogs in Constanţa County in 2008, a man who was mauled to death in a field near Onești by a pack of 15-20 stray dogs in 2022, a 4-year old boy who was killed by stray dogs in Craiova in 2025, and a 3-year old boy who was killed by stray dogs in Mărășești in 2025. In Bucharest, in the 21st century, at least three deaths have occurred due to stray dogs attacks: a Japanese citizen in 2006, a woman in 2011, and a 4-year old boy in 2013; and an additional death has occurred in nearby Ilfov county (a woman in 2023).

A study on fatal dog attacks conducted in Europe between 1995-2016, using data from 30 European countries, found that Romania had the fourth highest rate of deaths due to dog attacks, behind only Hungary, Cyprus and Finland.

In 2018, the European Pet Food Federation estimated that Romania had the highest per capita number of dogs in the European countries studied. Dogs in Romania include herding dogs, guard dogs, pets and stray dogs. In addition to indigenous breeds of livestock guarding dogs, there are also imported breeds of dogs, including Kangal Shepherd Dogs, Central Asian Shepherd Dogs and Caucasian Shepherd Dogs. Romania also has a large cat population. A 2024 study of several European countries found that Romania had the highest cat ownership, with 48% of households in Romania owning at least one cat. This includes many farm cats. There are also numerous feral cats in Romanian cities.

In a study conducted in 2018–2020, a wolf-dog hybrid was discovered in the Southern Carpathian forests of Romania. The study found that although this discovery may presently seem insignificant, it could pose a threat to the genetic integrity of the wolf population in the long term, and it advised the studying of the problem of stray dogs entering the habitat of wolves.

== Rabies in Romania ==
The last case of human death due to rabies in Romania happened in 2025, when a man in Iași County died, after being bitten by a rabid stray dog. This was the first case of human death due to rabies in 13 years, with the previous case having occurred in 2012, when a 5-year-old girl from Bacău County was bitten by a stray dog. Although human deaths due to rabies are rare in Romania due to prompt administering of post-exposure prophylaxis jabs, rabies has not been eradicated and it continues to be present in animals. Since 2007, Romania has implemented a program of eradication of rabies through oral vaccination of foxes. The number of rabid animals detected varies by year; since 2000, the highest number of cases was in 2008 (1089) and the lowest in 2017, when only 2 cases were detected. Since the figures refer to detected cases, the total numbers may be higher. The number of detected cases per year since 2000 is as such: 97 cases in the year 2000, 386 in 2001, 115 in 2002, 95 in 2003, 187 in 2004, 530 in 2005, 293 in 2006, 377 in 2007, 1089 in 2008, 516 in 2009, 469 in 2010, 342 in 2011, 457 in 2012, 486 in 2013, 142 in 2014, 28 in 2015, 14 in 2016, 2 in 2017, 4 in 2018, 4 in 2019, 5 in 2020, 5 in 2021, 28 in 2022, 51 in 2023, 28 in 2024 and 107 in 2025.

Rabies cases occur primarily in the North of the country and in the region of Western Moldavia, especially close to the border with Ukraine and the border with Moldova. Nevertheless, in July 2024 there was a rabies case in Bucharest in a dog with an owner. Although Romanian law obligates people to vaccinate their dogs against rabies, some dog owners ignore the law. Romanian law also requires certain breeds of dogs to wear a muzzle when appearing in public. Romania has enacted special procedures to deal with rabies outbreaks, such as implementing special measures in the affected geographic regions for the safety of people and animals.

Romania's close relations with France in the 19th century and the first part of the 20th century meant that Romania was early to adopt the rabies vaccine for humans (which was invented by French scientist Louis Pasteur in 1885), with Romania creating an anti-rabies center in Bucharest in 1888. The center, which was established by Victor Babeș, was the second such center in the world. However, Romania continues to struggle with rabies, with animal cases being discovered annually, due to a variety of factors, including a large population of mammals, especially in the Carpathian Mountains, and Romania's geopolitical location, with the war in Ukraine potentially increasing risks.

== Involvement ==
The issue of stray dogs in Bucharest has multiple parties, each bearing an interest in the issue.

=== NGOs ===
Many NGOs have been operating in Romania since the 1990s, dealing with the issue of stray animals in Romania. These include both Romanian and foreign NGOs.

Asociația Cuțu Cuțu (literally translated Doggie Doggie Association in English) is a Romanian NGO that focuses on animal rights, and more specifically, stray dogs. It was founded in 2002 and has been lobbying against euthanasia, and other laws concerning stray dogs. It has been created as a response to the abuse stray dogs are facing.

On May 4, 2012, Cuțu Cuțu created controversy by issuing a press release, which was flagged as "shocking", "terrible" and has been associated with Reductio ad Hitlerum by the Romanian mass-media and bloggers. The press release compared dog shelters with the Nazi concentration camps. Two days after the press release, the association has released another press statement, which mentioned the fact that they are not antisemitic and have "plenty of Romanian Jewish friends". Furthermore, it has been mentioned that what they wanted to point out is that the authorities treat dogs the way Jews were treated in 1940.

Vier Pfoten (Four paws in English) – an international animal welfare organisation – has been actively involved in lobbying for improvements in animal welfare in Romania for many years, running CNR (capture, neuter, release) projects to manage the stray animal population in a humane and effective way working with municipalities across Romania, as well as supporting Speranta shelter (a shelter for 500 rescued stray dogs) close to Bucharest.

=== Brigitte Bardot ===
French actress and animal rights activist Brigitte Bardot had long taken an interest in the management of stray dogs in Bucharest, including through visiting the city in 2001, and in the following years she wrote several open letters to Romanian authorities. The first letter was sent in the Stray Dogs Euthanasia Law. She deemed the project to be a "project of systematic extermination". Furthermore, Bardot appealed to the "majority" in order to find a "solution approved by the European Union, from which Romania has been part of since 2007". The content of the letter has been received with criticism and skepticism in Romania. The President of Romania responded by saying that "Brigitte Bardot was beautiful during the reign of the Kings of France".

The second letter was addressed to the "president of the unfortunate Romanian nation". Bardot stated that the President of Romania is "the successor of Nicolae Ceaușescu". In the letter, she asked "where the money from the European Commission was" and "where the 3.42 million vaccinated dogs were". Bardot said that "the dogs are paying with their life as a result of a corrupt management". She ended the letter by saying that she had "pleasant memories about Romania", but that she is "currently comparing it to hell".

== See also ==
- Stray dog attacks in India
