= Kratu (dog) =

Romanian rescue dog

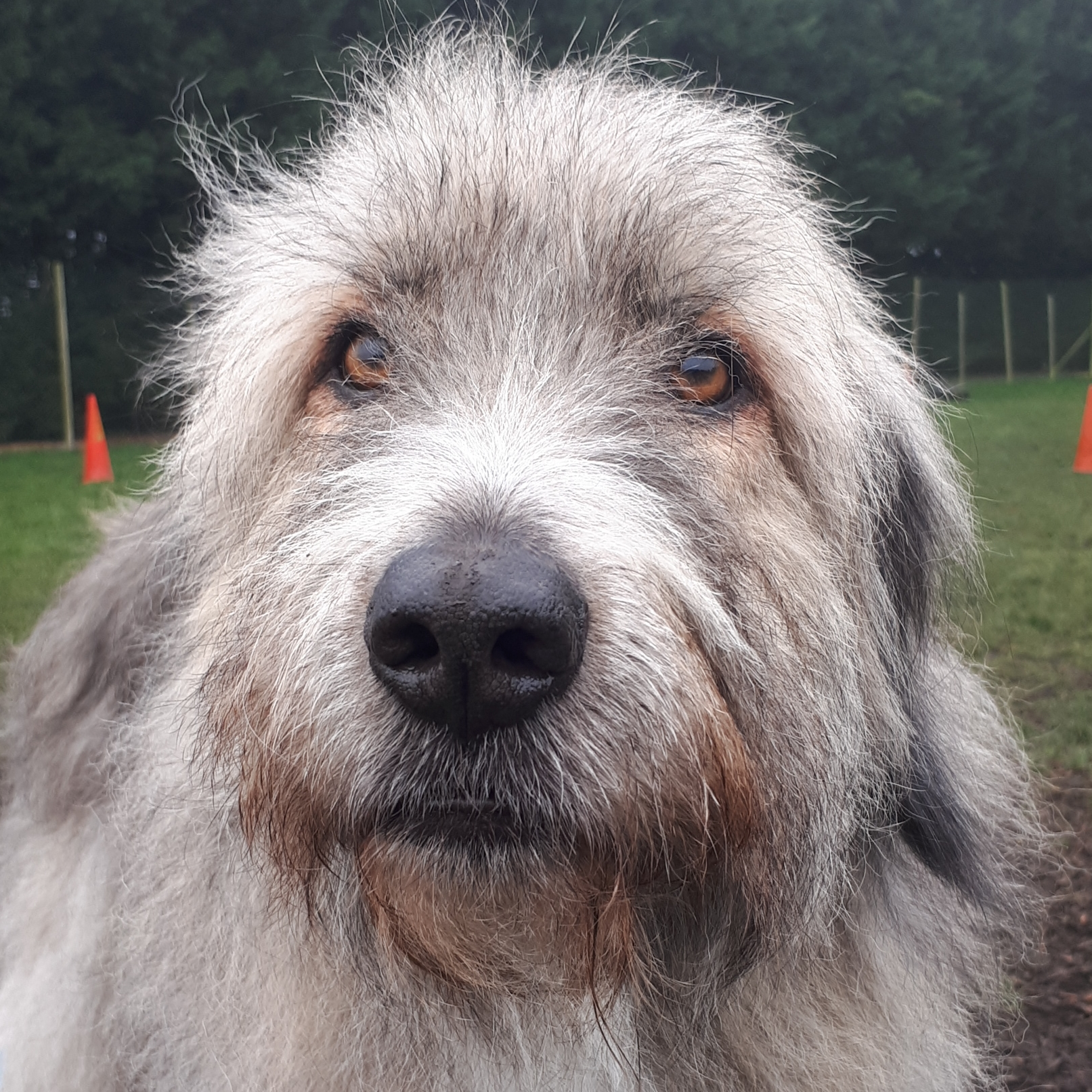
Kratu in 2020

Baron Kratu von Bearbum, or Kratu, is a Carpathian-Mioritic mix rescue dog from Romania. He appeared at the Crufts dog show 2017–2020, where his unexpectedly rule-defiant behaviour appealed to the audience and became a viral phenomenon.

== Early life ==
In 2014, when Kratu was a few weeks old, he was rescued from harsh conditions in Cluj-Napoca, Romania, at the request of his British owner to-be, Tessa Eagle Swan. Eagle Swan says that she started to train him through WhatsApp before he arrived in the UK. "Kratu" is a Sanskrit word, meaning "strength".

== Training and activities ==
Eagle Swan, who is autistic, has trained Kratu as her assistance dog, as well as giving him some agility training. He has visited a screening for a film about Romanian stray dogs at the European Parliament and is an ambassador for the all-party parliamentary dog advisory welfare group (APDAWG) as of 2022. He has also worked as a model. Eagle Swan and Kratu went to Romania in 2018 and met with students of animal psychology at the Babeș-Bolyai University. Eagle Swan says:

"Kratu succeeds where the system fails me... Where I was isolated, lost, and lonely, he has brought companionship. Motivation to look after him and his welfare makes me face my issues and get through them as his wellbeing is vital to me."

Kratu was named "Social media superstar" at the Mirror People’s Pet Awards in 2021. A book written by Eagle Swan and Lynne Barrett-Lee, Incredible Kratu, was published in March 2022.

Kratu and Eagle Swan met Charles III after a Ceremony of the Keys in Edinburgh in 2024.

== Appearances at Crufts ==
Kratu and Eagle Swan did a course of agility at the Crufts dog show in 2017, representing the Wood Green charity. They were invited back the next year, and this time videoclips of Kratu went viral. He appeared again the two following years, and various media have commented that though he is not doing what he is supposed to, he is stealing the show, enjoying himself and being loved by the audience. Commentator Peter Purves said "He can do all sorts of things, except, er, follow instructions." Eagle Swan calls him "a natural clown", and stated in 2020 that because of a pinched sciatic nerve, he will not be participating again.

People commented in 2020 that "Kratu did not win the rescue dog agility course competition at Crufts this year, or in 2019 and 2018, but he did win the hearts of countless onlookers." According to KSL.com, "Basically, if dogs had class clowns, Kratu would be the king of them all."

== See also ==
- List of individual dogs
