= Rakesh Shukla =

Rakesh Shukla may refer to:

- Rakesh Shukla (cricketer) (1948–2019), Indian cricketer
- Rakesh Shukla (politician), Indian politician of the Bharatiya Janata Party
- Rakesh Shukla (animal welfare activist), businessman and animal rights activist
- Rakesh Shukla (indian litterateur), indian professor and hindi litterateur
