= Mirotic =

Mirotic may refer to:

- Mirotic (album), 2008 album by TVXQ
  - "Mirotic" (song), 2008 song in the above album
- Nikola Mirotić (born 1991), Spanish professional basketball player

== See also ==
- Mirotice, town in the Czech Republic
- Romanian Mioritic Shepherd Dog (Romanian: Ciobănesc Românesc Mioritic)
