= Rakesh Shukla (animal welfare activist) =

Indian entrepreneur, motivational speaker, and animal welfare activist

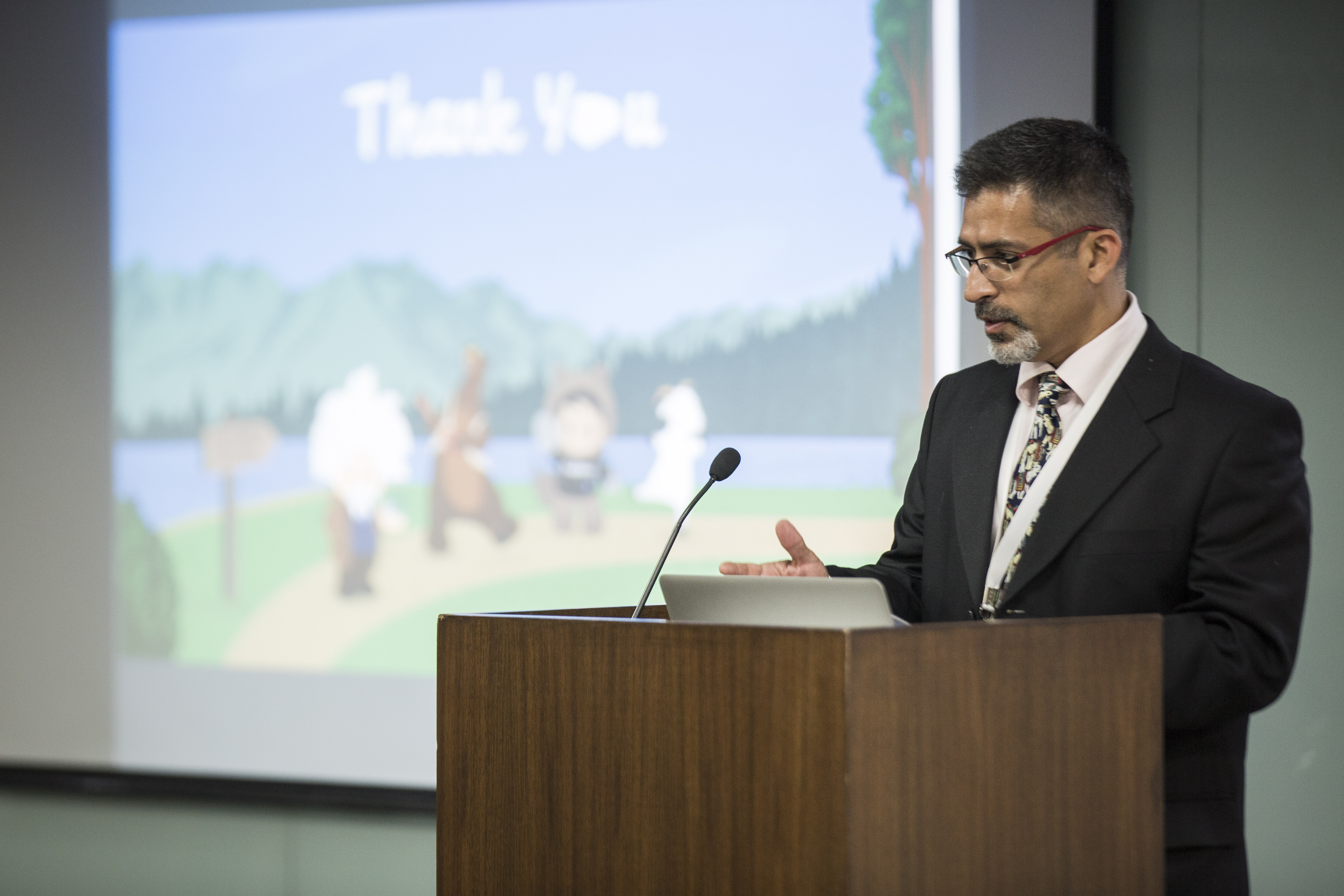
- Born: 1971 (age 54–55)

Rakesh Shukla (born 1971) is an Indian entrepreneur, motivational speaker, and animal welfare activist. He runs a home in Bangalore for over 700 rescued dogs.

== Early career ==
Shukla received a Bachelors of Engineering degree in Electronics and Communications, then a Masters in Business Administration. He then worked in various telecom companies in India, the US, and Singapore before becoming an entrepreneur.

Shukla self-funded and created The Writers Block (TWB) in 2006, which provides technical writing programs. The company employs a large number of women who had left jobs to raise children.

== Animal welfare ==
Shukla founded Voice of Stray Dogs (VOSD). In July 2010, it was merely a website.

In response to media reports of the July 2011 death of a two-year-old boy named Sandeep, supposedly killed and eaten by stray dogs, Shukla carried out his own investigations at the site, persuading the authorities to do a second autopsy. He eventually finding evidence against the dogs being responsible. After this, Shukla held a press conference under VOSD's name.

With the eventual death of Cookie, a paralyzed St. Bernard found in garbage in Bangalore in September 2012, Shukla established an independently funded dog rescue home under the auspices of VOSD. VOSD began rescuing injured or ill dogs on 15 October 2012 and began emergency rescues on 16 October 2013.

== Recognition ==
For his work rescuing stray dogs, Shukla has been labeled "The Dogfather of India". He has appeared on television, radio, and newspaper interviews speaking on behalf of dogs, including BBC, Al Jazeera, CNN IBN, NDTV, and TED.

VOSD ran a 2017 program called "PatriotDogs", which provides homes for dogs retiring from the Indian security and military forces. It got support from celebrities Virat Kohli and Soha Ali Khan Pataudi, and appeared in publications Times of India, the New Indian Express, MTV India, and the Deccan Chronicle.

Shukla was named one of Bangalore's Heroes in 2013. He features in the book Real Inspiring Stories by Pradeep Khare.
