= Tornjak =

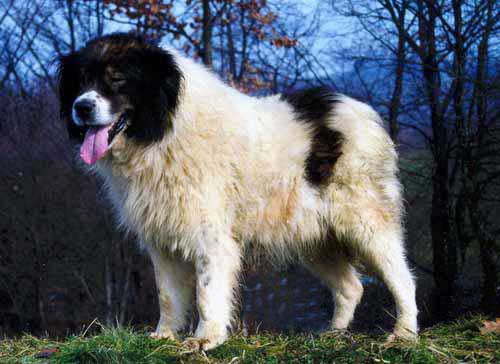
- Tornjak
- Origin: Bosnia and Herzegovina, Croatia
Traits
Height	Males	65 - 70 cm
	Females	60 - 65 cm
Kennel club standards
- Croatian Kennel Club: standard
- Fédération Cynologique Internationale: standard [355 standard]

The Tornjak (Serbo-Croatian pronunciation: [tǒrɲaːk]), also known as the Bosnian-Herzegovinian sheepdog, is a recreated breed of livestock guardian dog native to Bosnia and Herzegovina and Croatia. They are molosser-type mountain dogs, similar to other livestock guardian breeds of the region, the Šarplaninac, Bucovina Shepherd Dog, and the Greek Shepherd.

== History ==
The earliest written reference to the breed dates back to the 11th century. Descriptions of the Tornjak are present in the writings of Peter Horvat, Bishop of Đakovo, in 1374, and Peter Lukić, Canon of the Đakovo diocese, in 1752. The dogs are described as guarding dogs, intelligent and bred to limit aggression. They were the transhumance shepherd dog of Vlachs in medieval Bosnia.

Prevalence of the Tornjak gradually declined with the end of nomadic sheep herding in the region. In the early 1970s, a group of cynologists began a project to identify and breed dogs sharing similar characteristics to those found in historic writings about the breed. Pure blood breeding began in 1978 and the foundation stock of the modern breed is genetically homogeneous landrace shepherding dogs identified through this process.

Tornjaks were first imported to the UK in 2013 with intentions of working towards UK Kennel Club Recognition.

== Name ==
Numerous names are used to describe dogs from this region sharing similar characteristics and fulfilling a similar role.

The FCI standard name, Tornjak, is derived from the word tor, meaning sheep pen. The breed is called Toraši in Sinj and the Kamešnica mountain, and the shepherds of the Dinara mountains call the breed Dinarci. Bosanski Ovčar Tornjak, meaning Bosnian Shepherd Dog and Hrvatski pas planinac, meaning Croatian mountain dog, are also used.

== Characteristics ==
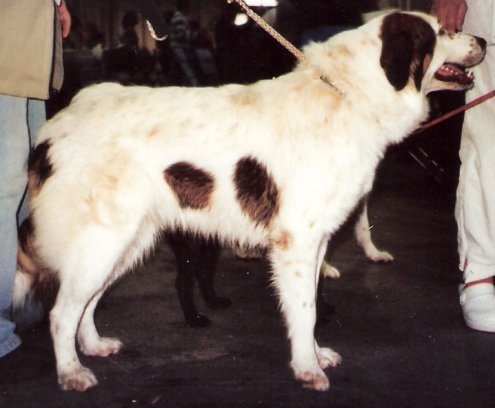
A female Tornjak of Croatian breeding participating in the European Winner Show 2008 in Budapest, Hungary.

=== Appearance ===
The Tornjaks are large dogs, with somewhat square-bodied features and relatively agile movements. Despite this, their bones are not lightweight. The Tornjak is a long-coated breed with short hair over the face and legs. The hair is distinctively long and abundant over the neck (mane), and on the back of the upper thighs (breeches). The tail is notably feathered and carried like a flag while the dog moves. The coat is very dense and cannot be parted.

As a rule, the Tornjaks are particolored, with white being the dominant ground color. White markings are most commonly found around the neck, over the head, and along the legs. The patches can be any color. Similar to other livestock guardian dogs, the distinct markings served a utilitarian purpose, helping shepherds distinguish their dogs from both sheep and wolves.

Temperament

Tornjaks have a calm temperament. A typical adult Tornjak is a calm, peaceful, and seemingly indifferent animal, but when the situation demands, it is a vigilant and alert watchdog. The character is equal to the temperament; they are not nervous nor aggressive. In general, they are very tough, sturdy, and not overly demanding dogs. With their human family, they can be very affectionate. When living in a pack they are highly social animals, without fighting between the pack members. Towards strangers or other animals, as a rule, Tornjaks are not overly aggressive. But when the situation calls upon it, Tornjaks are quite decisive, and they can attack even stronger rivals without consideration. Shepherds used to say that a Tornjak that guards the flock is a fair match to two wolves and that a couple of Tornjaks will confront and chase away a bear. In these situations, Tornjaks can be very tenacious.

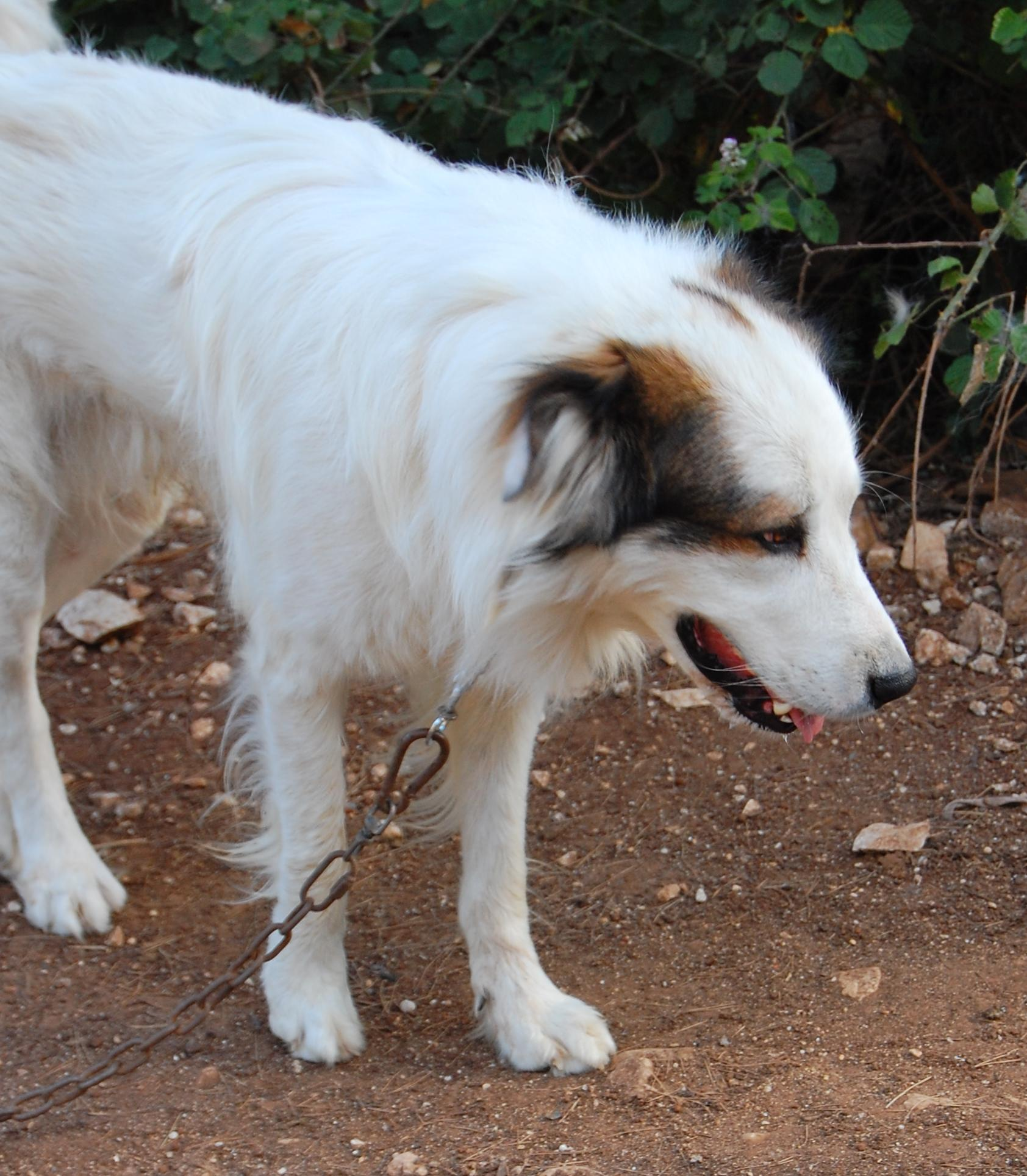
The coat is shorter in the Summer.

== Activities ==
A Tornjak's exercise levels are usually not demanding, especially in the first 9–12 months (during the last intensive growth period). They prefer long walks without a leash and a lot of playing with other dogs. They will also be just as satisfied with only a 20-minute walk if their owner is in a hurry. Tornjaks learn quickly and do not forget easily; they happily perform tasks and are therefore easy to train. Strong and hardy, these dogs lie on the ground during the snowy winter nights and often get covered with snow without freezing due to their thick coats. They are primarily used for herding and protection of livestock.

== Ban ==
As of 2010, the owning, breeding, and importation of Tornjaks is banned in Denmark because they are classified as dangerous under the Danish Act on Dogs. The ban applies to anyone within Danish borders, even tourists.

== See also ==
- List of dog breeds
