= Small Međimurje Dog =

Mali Međimurski Pas
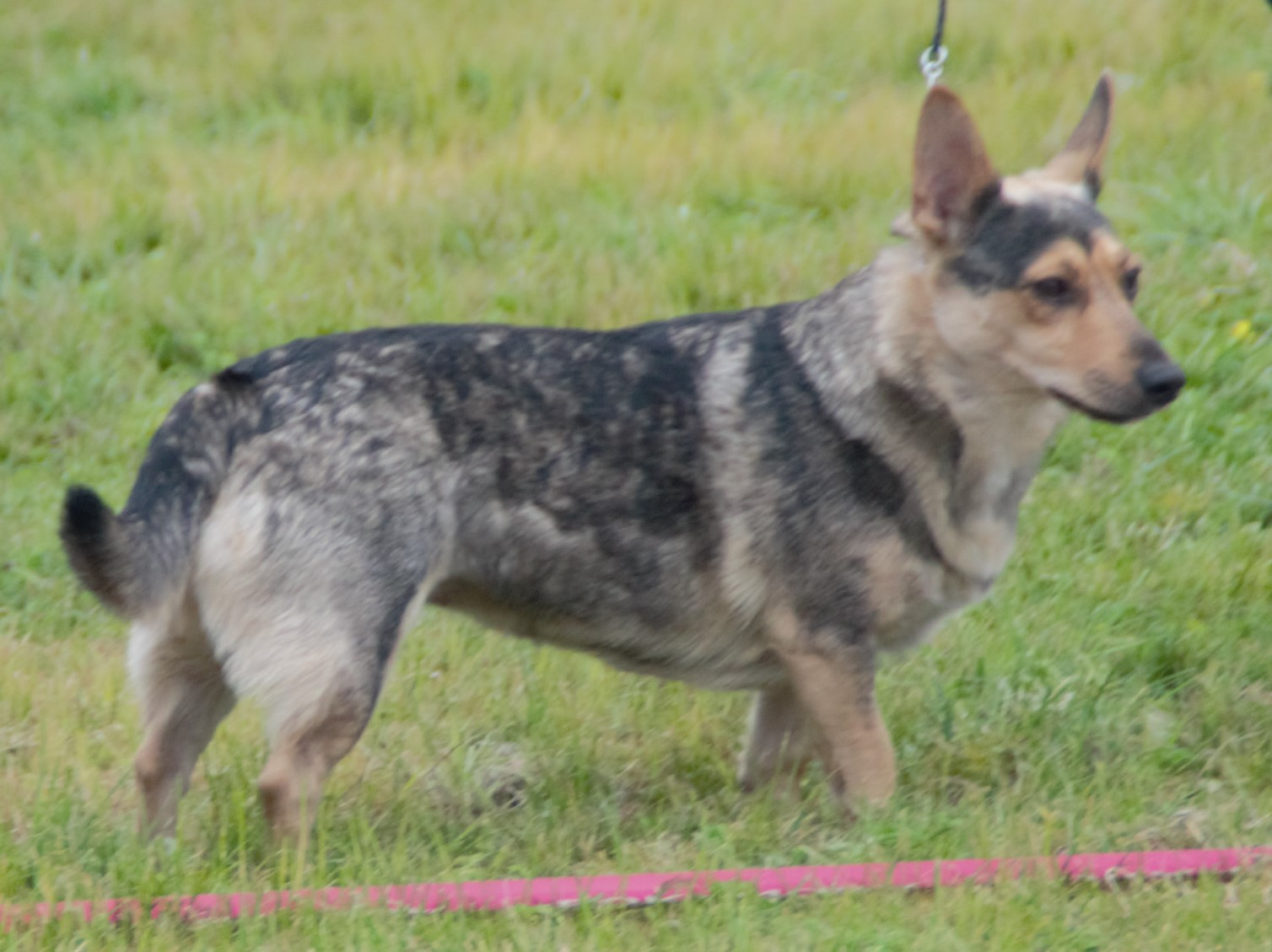
- Common nicknames: Međi, Štakoraš, Hrčičar
- Origin: Croatia
Traits
- Height: 28–33 centimetres (11–13 in)
- Coat: Coarse hair thick, hard, straight, not wooly or thin. Short hair on head, ears and legs. Longer and dense hair on the upper side of neck (mane) and tail.
- Colour: Single-colour, Two-colour, Tri-colour. Black, different shades of brown, yellow and gray. White colour is not desirable to more than 1/3 of the body.
- Litter size: 3–5 puppies
Kennel club standards
- Croatian Kennel Club: standard

The Small Međimurje Dog, also known as Međi, or locally well known as Štakoraš ("Ratter"), is a breed of dog native to Croatia. It has been bred for over a hundred years in northwestern Croatia, in Međimurje area mostly. It is found in rural yards as a guard dog and hunter for harmful rodents. The breed is currently recognized by national kennel clubs of Croatia, Bosnia and Herzegovina, Serbia, Netherlands, Finland, and the Czech Republic. The breed is currently not recognized by the FCI. The unofficial FCI classification of the breed is FCI Group 1 Sheepdogs and Cattle Dogs (except Swiss Cattle Dogs) Section 1 / Sheepdogs, without working trial.

== History ==
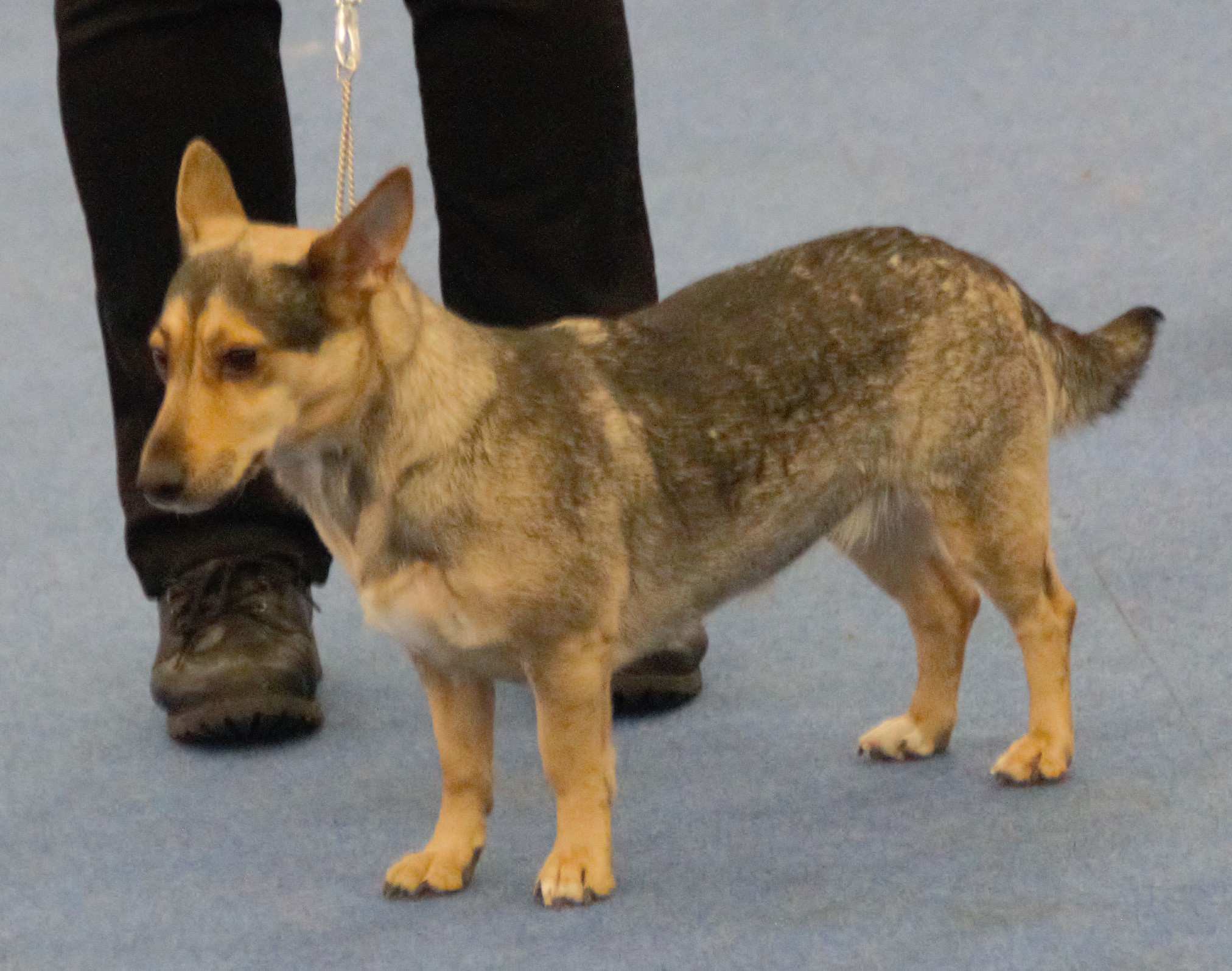

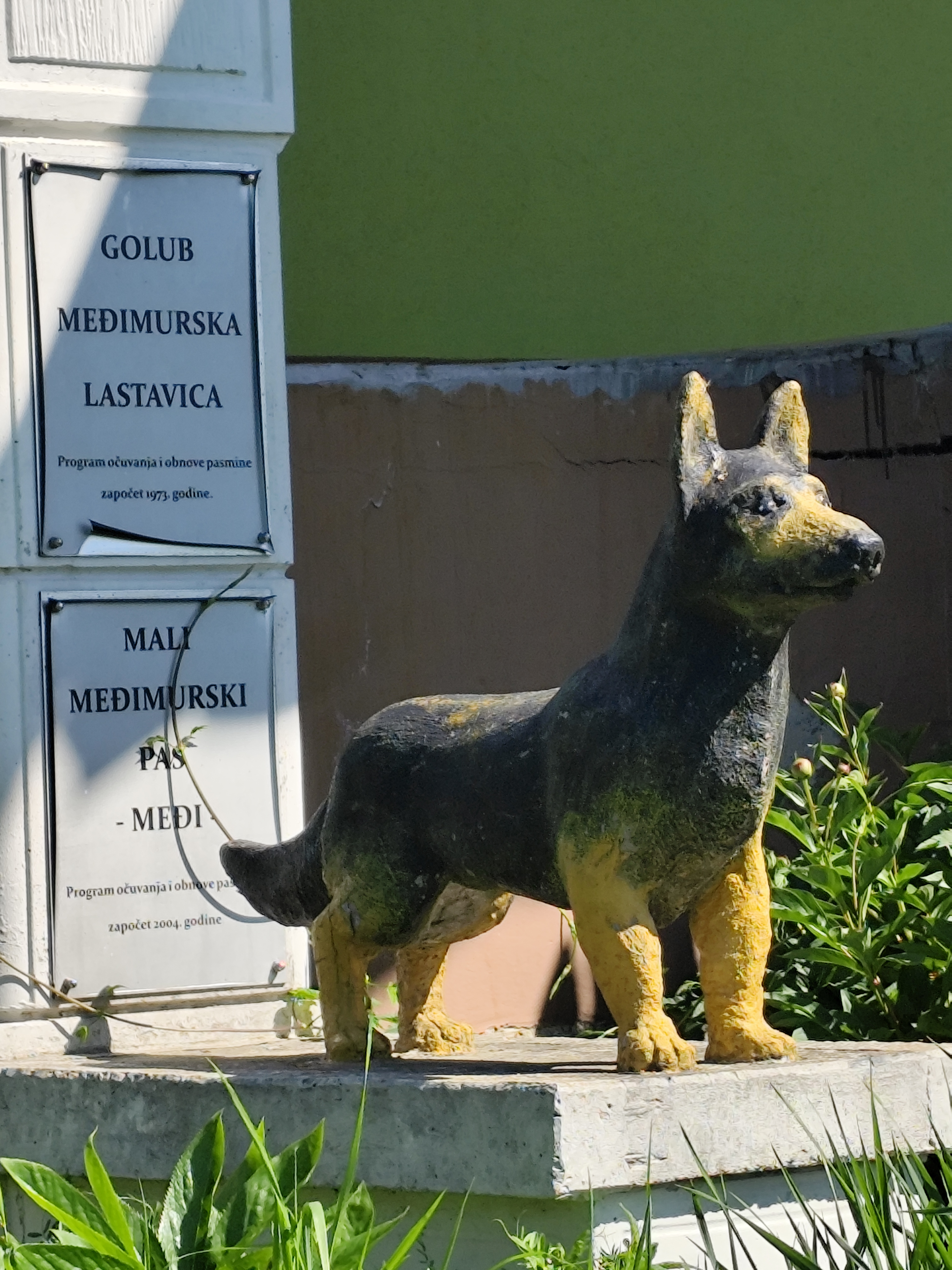
Monument to Small Međimurje Dog in Donja Dubrava, Međimurje County

The people of Međimurje call it "Hrčičar" or "Štakoraš" ("Ratter") because it specializes in hunting rats, especially the larger Norwegian rats. It is a locally very well known dog breed in northwestern Croatia. According to tradition, in order for the owner of the house to keep it, the dog first had to pass a test, which meant reacting quickly and catching a rat that was running away after being chased out of the basement, manure pit, attic, or storage room. The dog that caught a rat and threw it high in the air and then caught it with their teeth, were especially appreciated. As society developed, food was no longer the main problem, and so were no longer rats, and thus the role of the dog that hunted rats was reduced. The little dog was a favorite in Međimurje yards, farms and households with a reputation for being a very smart and cunning dog.

In order to protect the breed and save it from extinction, i.e. its blending into another breed, a group of enthusiasts started standardization. As part of the "Međimurska lastavica" association of small animal breeders in Donja Dubrava, a section of "Small Međimurje dog breeders" was formed on February 12, 2003. The selection started from the beginning, with the search for the dogs that have the most characteristics that correspond to that type of dog and the registration of these dogs in the registry book. Through controlled breeding, certain good traits were tried to be retained, while bad ones were improved or suppressed. Having seen the selection results and the progress achieved since the beginning of standardization, at the session of the executive board of the Croatian Kennel Club on December 30, 2010. It was decided that the Small Međimurje dog - Međi - is recognized as the 7th Croatian native breed and the entry into the Croatian Conditional Pedigree Book (HUR) of the HKS is approved. The Međi officially became a native breed with the opportunity to participate in all exhibitions in Croatia, and was also presented to the general public for the first time at the 3rd main breeding exhibition of native dog breeds in Varaždin on May 21, 2011, and later at numerous other exhibitions. In 2019, the first original scientific paper was published about the breed, in which the results show that the "Međi" is a unique breed with at least 6 different lines (among those 39 dogs which were sampled).

== Characteristics ==
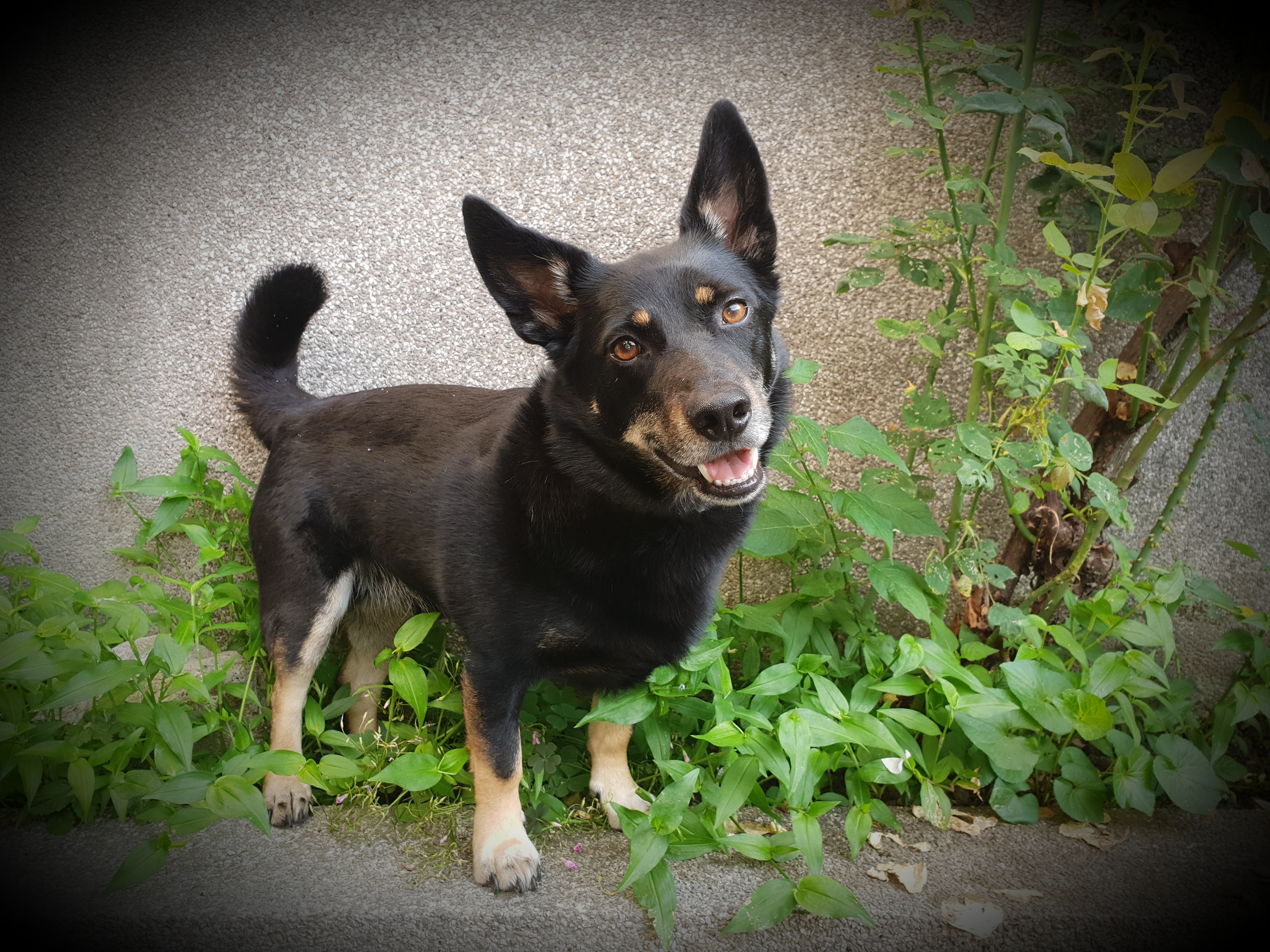
Međi

=== Appearance ===
The Međi is a small dog of rectangular shape with short legs. The body length can exceed one third of its height at the withers. With a medium body structure and bones not too heavy, it is a lively, agile, intelligent, and very obedient dog. According to the morphological system, it belongs to the lupoid type of dog with a wedge-shaped head and triangular erect ears. The coat is short, rather hard and flat, somewhat longer on the upper part of the neck (mane) and on the lower inner side of tail (fringes). Its tail reaches the hock; when alert and happy, it is carried in a slight curve above the back. The most commonly coloured specimens are bicoloured with various forms and patterns, as well as the tricoloured.

=== Temperament ===
It shows the qualities of a good guard dog, but is not aggressive towards people and other dogs nor to domestic animals. It is very persistent and diligent in its work, especially catching rodents. It is restrained towards strangers, incorruptible, and barking loudly to announce the arrival of a stranger. The Međi is very loyal and affectionate towards its owner and family and is playful in contact with children. It is very intelligent and impeccable in performing verbal commands.

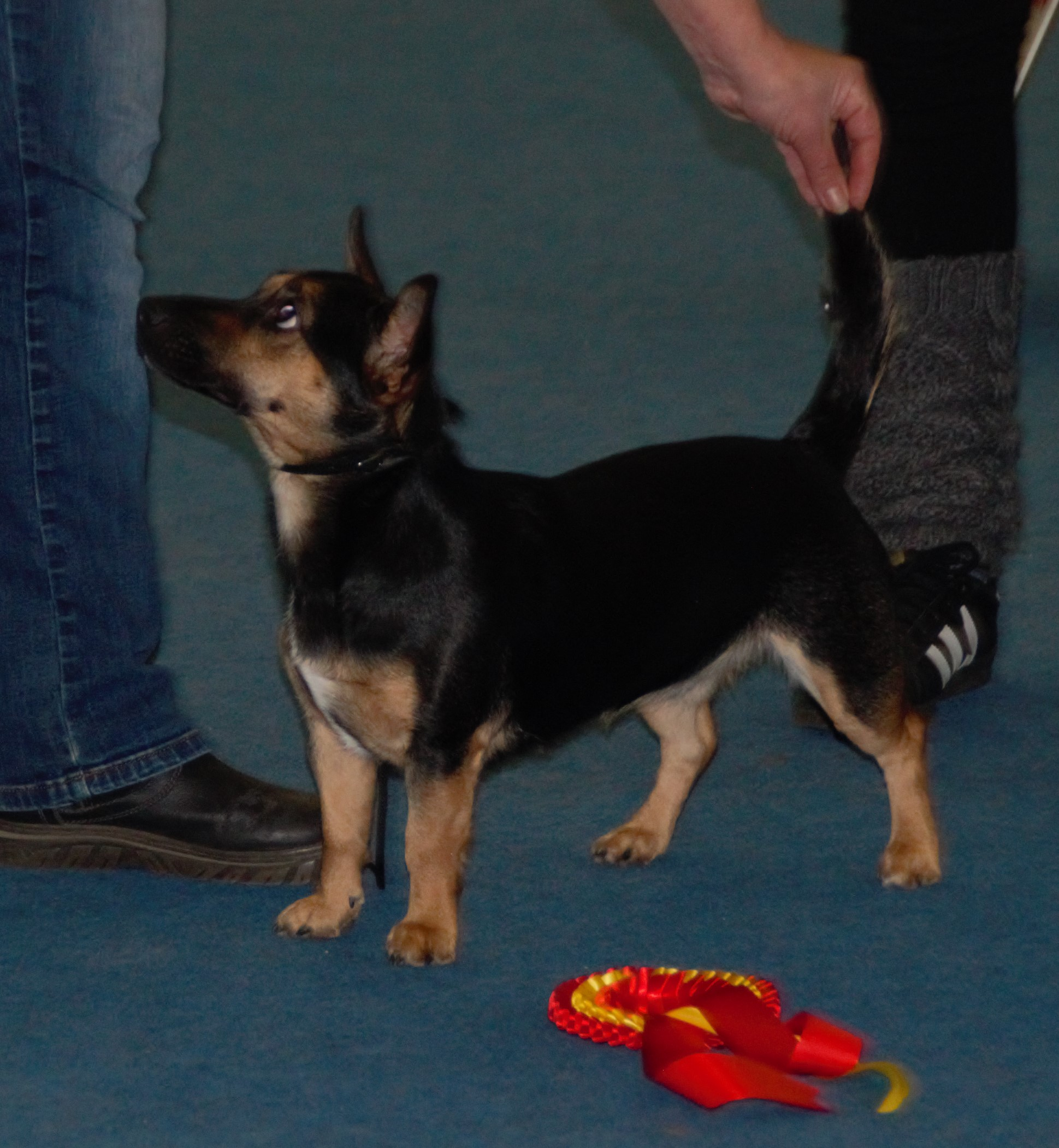

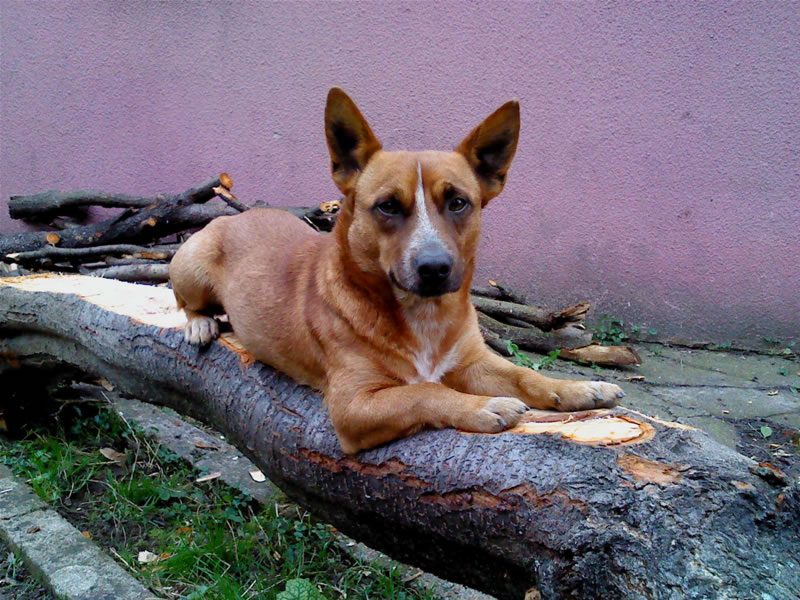

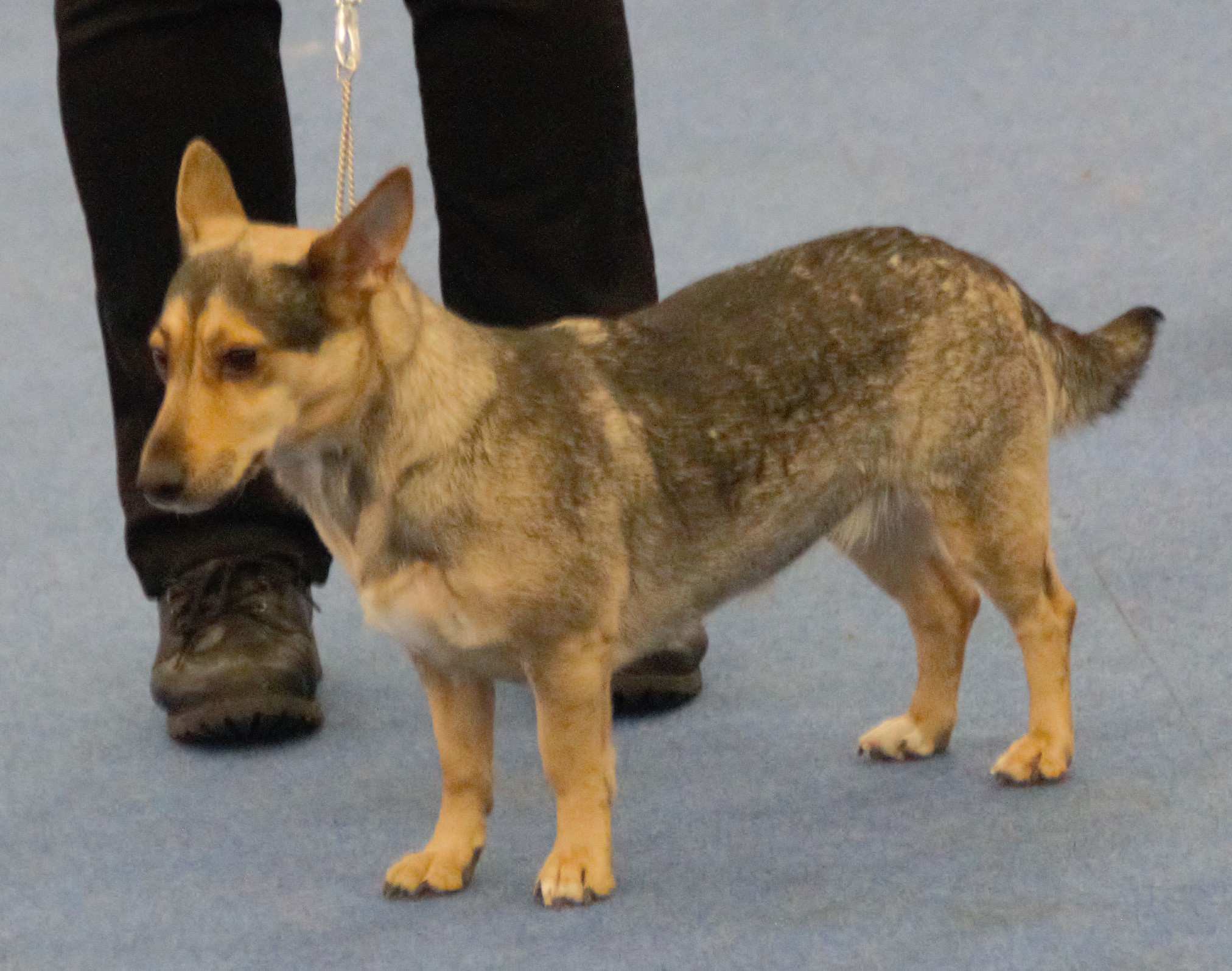

== See also ==
- List of dog breeds
- Guard dog
- Herding dog
- Ratter
- Working dog
