= Bucovina Shepherd Dog =

Romanian Bucovina Shepherd Dog
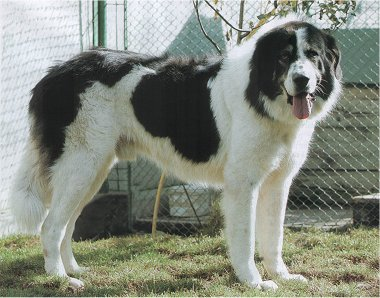
- Romanian Bucovina Shepherd Dog
- Other names: Bucovina Sheepdog; Bucovina Shepherd; Southeastern European Shepherd
- Origin: Romania (Southeastern Europe)
Traits
Height	Males	68–78 cm (27–31 in)
	Females	64–72 cm (25–28 in)
Weight	Males	50–90 kg (110–200 lb)
	Females	50–80 kg (110–180 lb)
- Coat: see below
- Color: Clear white or white-beige with distinct patches of grey, black or black with red-fawn reflections
Kennel club standards
- Fédération Cynologique Internationale: standard

The Romanian Bucovina Shepherd Dog (Romanian: Ciobănesc Românesc de Bucovina) is a breed of livestock guardian dogs native to the historical Bukovina (Bucovina) region. The breed is closely related to other livestock guardian breeds of the region, such as the Greek Shepherd, Tornjak, or Šarplaninac. There are four Romanian shepherd dog breeds: the Romanian Mioritic Shepherd Dog (old name Barac), the Carpathian Shepherd Dog (old name Zăvod), the Romanian Raven Shepherd Dog, and the Bucovina Shepherd Dog. In the FCI, this particular breed is officially dubbed the "Romanian Bucovina Shepherd".

== History ==
It is a natural breed with its origin in the Carpathian Mountains of Romania. Special attention for the development of the breed arose in the regions of northeastern Romania, in the region of Bucovina, an area known for transhumance pastoralism. Selection and improvement have led to the actual type. The breed is used both for defending the flocks and herds and as watchdogs for households in the mentioned regions.

The first breed standard was written in 1982 and updated in 2001 by the Asociația Chinologică Româna (Romanian Kennel Club). The present standard, dating from March 29, 2002, was written and updated according to the model established in 1987 by the FCI General Assembly in Jerusalem.

In 2019, the Bucovina Shepherd Dog became fully recognized by the FCI.

== Temperament ==
The Bucovina Shepherd Dog was bred to protect sheep flocks and cattle herds, and proves courageous and very combative when potential predators are afoot. It is an excellent watchdog, having a very deep, powerful bark and being very alert when strangers enter its territory.

== Appearance ==
Large sized dog; commanding, haughty and proud.

=== Coat ===
Head and the front part of the legs are covered with short hair. On the body, hair is abundant, long (6–9 centimetres (2.4–3.5 in)), hair is much longer forming a mane; on the backside of the forequarters, the hair forms fringes; on the backside of hindquarters, the hair is longer and forms culottes. The tail is bushy.

=== Color ===
Main colour of coat is a clear white or white-beige with distinct patches of grey, black or black with red-fawn reflections. Black or grey ticks can appear on the legs. Brindle aspect of patches to be rejected.

=== Size ===
The male Bucovina Shepherd is 68–78 centimetres (27–31 in) tall. The females are close in size, at 64–72 centimetres (25–28 in).

=== Conformation ===
The Bucovina Shepherd's head is massive, slightly elevated with respect to the back line. The skull is moderately wide. The stop is slightly marked. The nose is black well developed and wide. The muzzle has the shape of a truncated cone, of the same length as the skull, well developed. It becomes progressively narrow towards the extremity but it is never pointed.

The lips are thick, well applied, with strong pigmentation. This breed should have strong jaws, with healthy white teeth and a scissors bite. Level bite is allowed.

The cheeks are not prominent. The eyes are small in comparison with the dimensions of the skull, almond-shaped and slanting, chestnut colored or slightly lighter, never yellow.

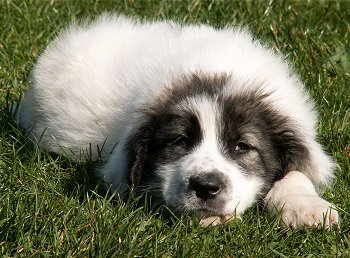
Bucovina Shepherd puppy at 2 months

Its eyelids are well pigmented. The ears are high, V-shaped, with rounded tips, fallen, and very close to the cheeks. The neck is moderately long, bulky and strong, without dewlap.

The muscular body is massive with a well-supported back. The chest is wide and tall, reaching the level of the elbows with well arched ribs. The skin is thick and dark gray. The hair is short on the head and forelegs. On the body, the hair is abundant, straight, thicker and harder, 2 1/2 to 3 1/2 inches (6–9 cm) long. The next layer of hair is shorter and thick, with a lighter color. On the neck, the hair is longer and forms a mane. On the backside of the legs, the hair forms fringes of moderate length.

The tail is bushy, covered with longer and thicker hair. When the dog is relaxed it tends to hold the tail low, reaching the point of the hock or even lower. When the dog is alert and is paying attention or is in action, the tail is elevated. In this case it may rise above the level of the back, sickle shaped.

=== Gait ===
Harmonious, elastic, well-coordinated, giving the impression of effortless power. The preferred gait is the trot.

== See also ==
- List of dog breeds
- Carpathian Shepherd Dog
- Romanian Mioritic Shepherd Dog
- Romanian Raven Shepherd Dog
