= Stray dog attacks in India =

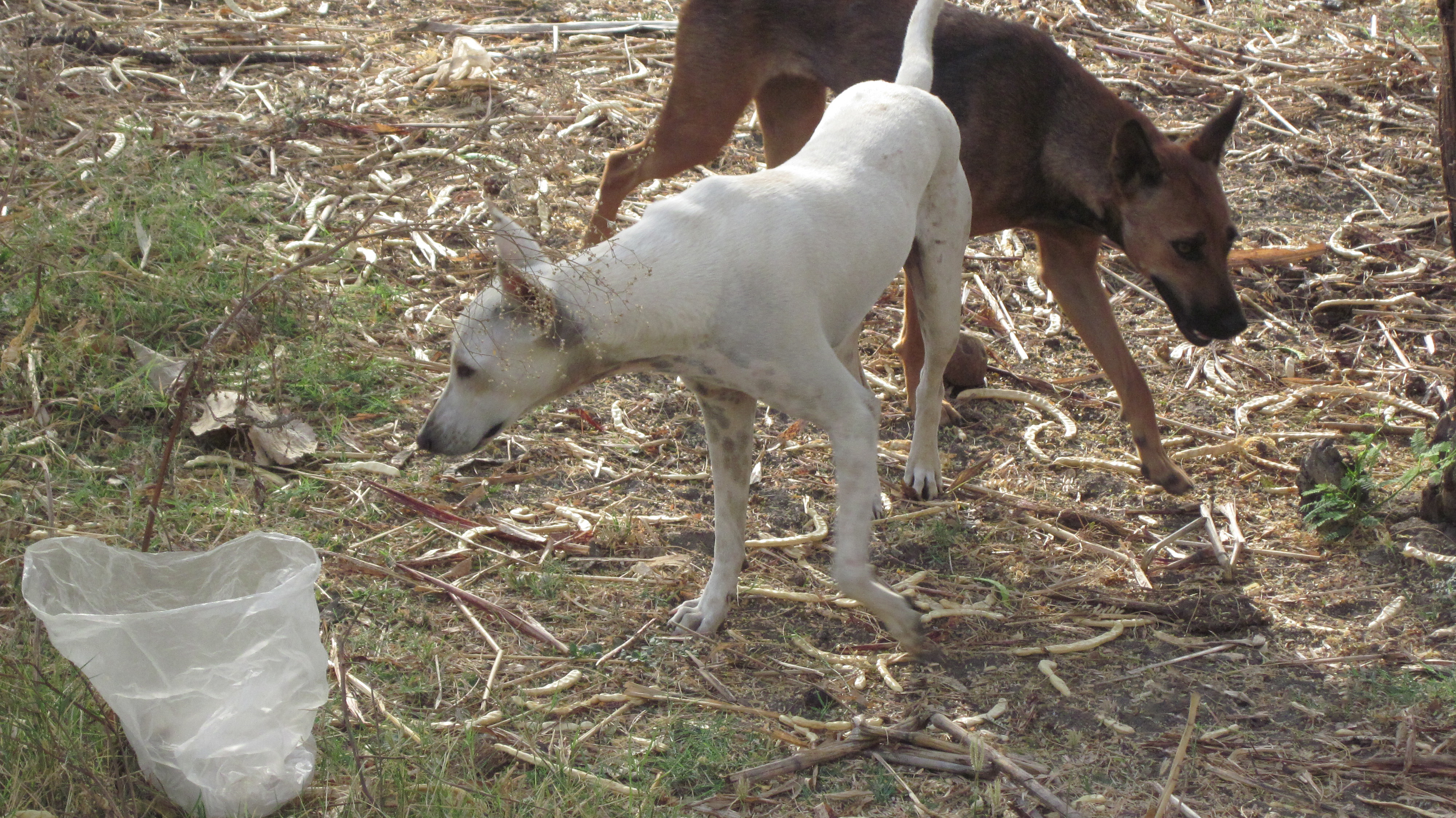
Stray dogs in Kerala, India

India has the highest number of attacks by stray dogs in the world. India has 36% of all rabies deaths in the world. There have been incidents where small babies are mauled to death by stray dogs in India. India also has the largest number of stray dogs in the world, along with the highest cases of rabies deaths. Many rabies deaths are unreported.

In compliance with Animal Birth Control rules, 2001, stray dogs may not be purposefully killed as it is unconstitutional. They have to be vaccinated and sterilized. Municipalities lack the money to sterilize stray dogs due to misuse and mismanagement of the granted funds for this purpose. Many Indians believe that stray dog attacks are common in their area and that the municipality does not take the necessary steps to vaccinate and sterilize in accordance to the Animal Birth Control Program to reduce dog bites. The ABC Program created in 2001 to check stray dog populations through mass vaccination and sterilization like Bhutan, but it resulted in severe mismanagement of granted funds and thus an increase in stray dogs populations due to negligence in performance and corruption.

In some Indian cities, stray dog attacks are often considered a danger to children and old people.

Uttar Pradesh, Odisha and Maharashtra have the highest number of stray dogs. Tamil Nadu, Maharashtra and West Bengal have the highest number of dog bites. The Bihar government found that stray dog bites are the third largest cause of disease in the state.

== Individual attacks ==
In 2007, in Bangalore, two children were killed by a pack of dogs. This resulted in mass killing of dogs throughout the city causing animal rights activists to protest against the Bruhat Bengaluru Mahanagara Palike for the action they took against stray dogs, which were cruel and improper.

In 2009, Meerut had several attacks by dogs that killed children.

A man was found dead in Darjeeling, on 2013, with his arms, chest, and legs partially eaten, initially sparking fears of a leopard attack as pug marks were found nearby before. Subsequent investigation using CCTV footage revealed that a pack of stray dogs, not a leopard, was responsible for killing him.

In 2014, on Delhi, a two-month-old baby girl was mauled to death by a stray dog. After that, residents attacked and killed the dog. The incident caused anger amongst the public who complained about civic bodies not controlling the growing stray dog population.

In 2015, in Delhi, seven-year-old boy was mauled to death by stray dogs. the National Human Rights Commission spoke about the death, and the need for a debate about human rights along with animal rights. Delhi High Court asked SDMC about street safety due to the death of the boy.

In 2016, a 65-year-old woman was mauled to death by stray dogs and a 90-year-old man was killed by stray dogs in Kerala. The woman was partially eaten by the stray dogs. After this, angry locals killed 100 stray dogs. Some people even offered bounties for killing stray dogs.

In 2018, stray dogs killed 14 children in Khairabad, Sitapur, Uttar Pradesh. The dogs were called man-eaters as some of the children's body parts were chewed off. Scientists investigated why the dogs were attacking children.

In 2019, a boy was attacked and killed and eaten by stray dogs in Amritsar. The dogs were called man-eater dogs by public. In 2019, Chandigarh saw an increase in stray dog bites and a child was mauled to death by stray dogs.

In 2020, a three-hour-old newborn baby was mauled to death by stray dogs in Farukhabad, Uttar Pradesh, as hospital staff left the window open in an operating theatre. Police filed a case against the hospital staff. The private hospital was closed up. Poor healthcare facilities in India was questioned.

In April 2022, stray dogs mauled children to death in Punjab.

In January 2022, in Bijnor, a 30-year-old woman was mauled to death by a pack of stray dogs, after a 15-year-old girl was killed by a group of stray dogs. This was a rare case of stray dogs killing an adult woman, as they usually attack children.

The death of a seven-month-old baby in Noida in October 2022 increased debates about dog rights. People made candlelit protests about the death of the child by stray dog attacks.

In 2023, nine women were killed by man-eater dogs in Begusarai, Bihar.

Wagh Bakri executive director died due to the brain haemorrhage he sustained due to a fall he took while warding off an alleged attack by street dogs.

February 19, 2023, a 4-year-old boy was fatally attacked by three stray dogs on a deserted street in Hyderabad, with graphic footage circulating on social media.

70-year-old retired doctor who had worked for UNICEF was killed in AMU. His death was caught on CCTV.

In Bijnor 10 people, including six children were killed by stray dogs from 2022 to 2023.

In 2025, a 13 year old boy in Samastipur was killed by stray dogs and due to attacks his facial skeleton was visible.

A national level para-athlete was killed by dog along with another person in Balangir.

A nine year old girl in Sambhal in Uttar Pradesh was killed by a group of stray dogs and her left arm was bitten off her body and taken away by the dogs.

A 32 year old woman was killed by stray dogs in Pune. Her death was caught on CCTV.

In 2026, an 8 year old girl was killed by stray dogs in Punjab.

== Attacks on wildlife and endangered species ==
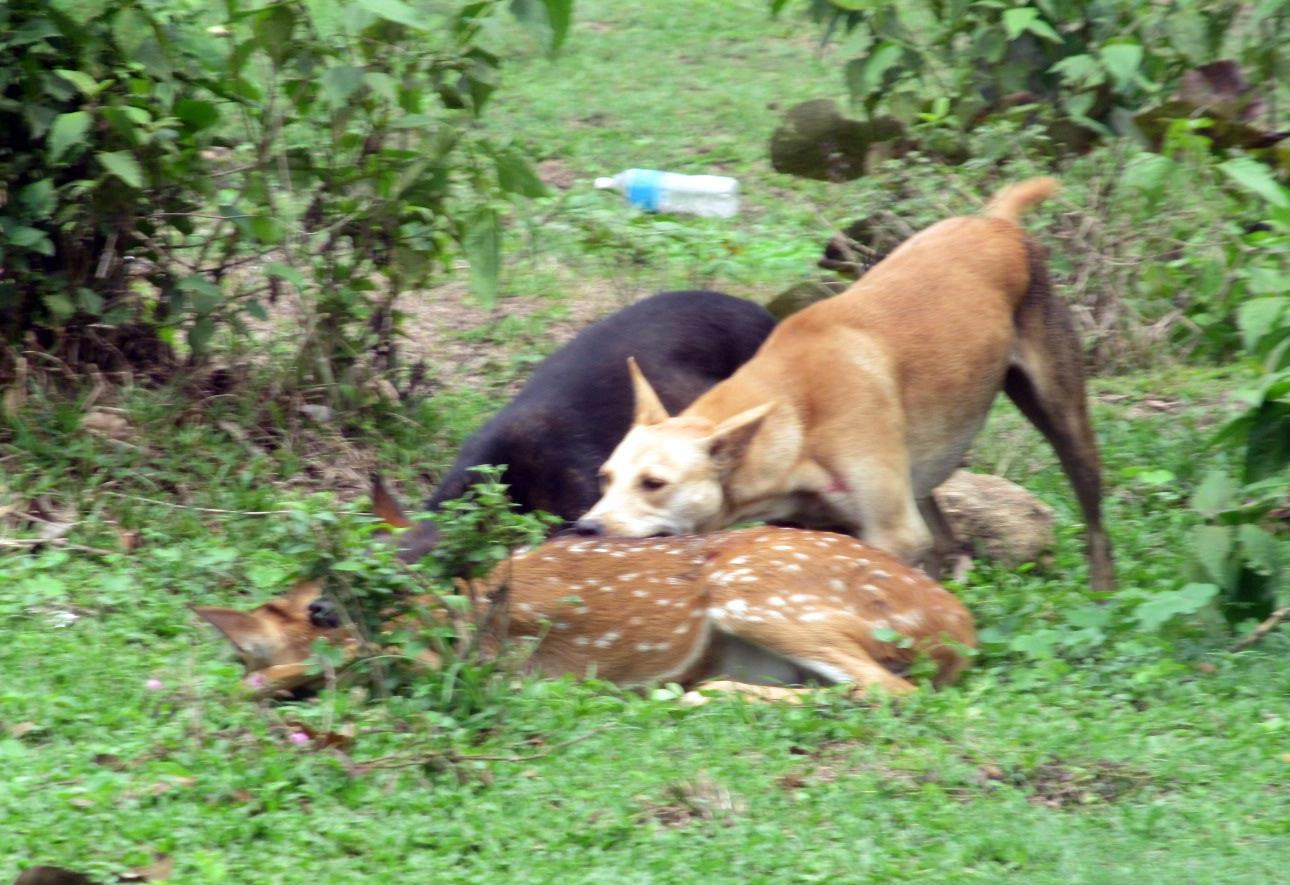
Stray dogs attacking a deer fawn in Kerala

Indian stray dogs kill endangered species and livestock in national parks, sanctuaries, buffer zones, and protected areas. Indian farmers have complained that stray dogs kill their livestock.

Researchers at the Ashoka Trust for Research in Ecology and the Environment have studied the impact of stray dogs on their surroundings in India. Golden langur, the great Indian bustard and green turtles were attacked by dogs in protected areas. Other research has also found that dogs are a threat to the ecosystem and endangered species all over India. Dogs attacked endangered stags in Kashmir, olive ridley eggs and hatchlings, killed foxes, endangered great Indian bustards, wild ass, Gazelle, Nilgai, Blackbuck and deer in sanctuaries.

Previous studies have shown that domesticated dogs endangered 188 species of animals and have caused 11 extinctions globally. Domestic dogs are regarded as aggressive mammalian predators. Stray dogs killed barking deer, sambar deer, spotted deer, jungle cats and leopards in forest areas of Munnar and Marayoor. In Rajasthan, the endangered Great Indian bustard is facing a major threat from stray dogs who kill the birds and even destroy their eggs. In Himachal Pradesh, the dogs are a threat to native wildlife like blue sheep, red panda, musk deer, Red foxes, weasels, martens, pika and marmots. The Himachal government said feral dogs were a threat to the ecosystem. In Hisar, Haryana, stray dogs killed 78% of wildlife in five years.

The Wildlife Protection Society of India (WPSI) have called for strict action to end the menace of stray dogs after the stripe-necked mongoose was mauled to death by stray dogs.

== Responses ==
Kerala's government faced opposition when they decided to cull dangerous dogs infected with rabies that were biting people. Kerala citizens hired vigilantes to kill dogs illegally after children were attacked by dogs and hospitalized.

The Tamil Nadu Directorate of Public Health (DPH) had issued advisory that anti-rabies vaccine alone is not sufficient in cases of deep or severe stray dog bites in children.

In August 2025, a two-judge bench of the Supreme Court ordered the Delhi Municipal Corporation to remove all street dogs from the Capital's streets and move them to shelters that do not exist. Subsequently, a three-judge bench of the court modified this order and stayed the direction for permanent confinement of all stray dogs in shelters across Delhi-NCR, acknowledging that the “no release” clause was too harsh and impractical due to insufficient shelter infrastructure. It ordered that dogs exhibiting aggressive behaviour and those infected with rabies are to be kept in separate shelters or pounds, not released back to public spaces. The court did not define “aggressive behaviour,” leaving room for further clarification.

== See also ==
- List of fatal dog attacks § India
- 2030 FIFA World Cup § Dog culls - Morocco carrying out a mass cull of stray dogs to protect tourists
