= Carpathian Shepherd Dog =

Romanian Carpathian Shepherd Dog
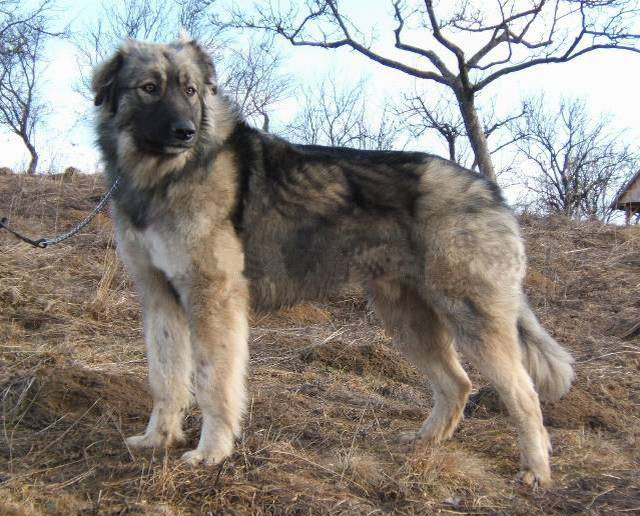
- Romanian Carpathian Shepherd Dog
- Other names: Ciobănesc Românesc Carpatin; Romanian Carpathian Shepherd; Câine Ciobănesc Carpatin; Carpathian Shepherd, Carpatin, Carpathian
- Origin: Romania
Traits
| Height | Males | 65 to 73 cm (26 to 29 in) |
| | Females | 59 to 67 cm (23 to 26 in) |
- Weight: 32 to 45 kg (71 to 99 lb)
- Coat: Double coat, shorter on the head and front of legs, longer on the tail, back of legs, chest
- Color: Wolf gray
Kennel club standards
- Romanian Carpathian Shepherd: standard
- Fédération Cynologique Internationale: standard

The Romanian Carpathian Shepherd Dog (Romanian: Ciobănesc Românesc Carpatin) is a large breed of livestock guardian dogs that originated in the Carpathian Mountains of Romania.

== History ==
Historically livestock guardian dogs were used by Romanian farmers, each farmer would breed the dog to his own need and there was no standard.

In 1979 a dog show in Bucharest would feature 18 dogs of the Carpatin breed, which would become the Carpathian Shepherd Dog. Following this the standard would be modified until the current standard was finalised.

In March 1998, a group of fans of the Carpathian Shepherd Dog founded the Carpathian Shepherd Dogs Club. The club was later renamed the National Club of Carpathian Shepherd Dog Breeders. The club observed that there many Carpathians in Rucăr, Argeș County that are considered ancestors of today's Carpathians.

A conference on the factors involved in the Romanian breeds took place in Bistrița in March 2003. The provisional homologation of the Carpathian Shepherd Dog was approved on July 6, 2005, in Buenos Aires, and it was fully recognized by the FCI in 2015.

== See also ==
- Bucovina Shepherd Dog
- List of dog breeds
- Romanian Mioritic Shepherd Dog
- Romanian Raven Shepherd Dog
