= Romanian Mioritic Shepherd Dog =

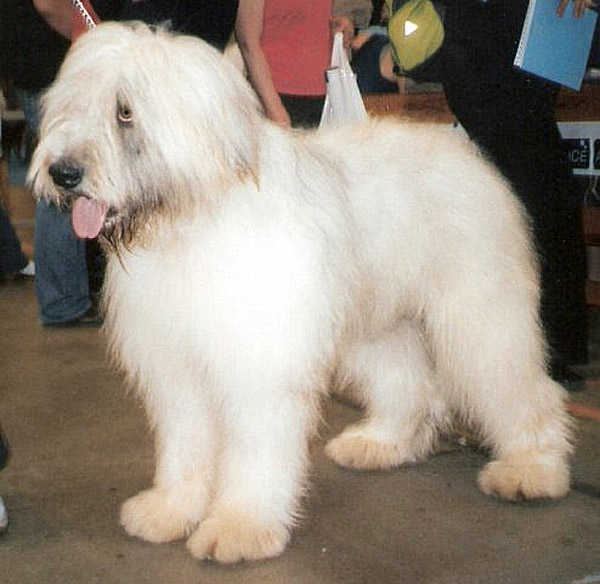
- Other names: Romanian Mioritic; Mioritic Shepherd; Ciobănesc Românesc Mioritic
- Origin: Romania
Kennel club standards
- Fédération Cynologique Internationale: standard

The Romanian Mioritic Shepherd Dog (Romanian: Ciobănesc Românesc Mioritic) is a breed of large livestock guardian dog that originated in the Carpathian Mountains of Romania.

== Description ==
=== Appearance ===
The male Mioritic stands about 70–75 centimetres (28–30 in) tall at the withers with the female slightly smaller at 65–70 centimetres (26–28 in). This massive dog is covered in thick fluffy hair. It may be white, with or without pale grey or cream patches, or pale grey or cream all over. The dog should have a "vigorous" appearance. Sexual dimorphism is evident in this breed, with males being significantly larger than females.

=== Temperament ===
This breed has discipline as one of its main characteristics. It is a calm and well-mannered dog. As this dog was used as a herd protector, it is very attached to family and goes all the way when protecting those it is attached to. Because of this dog's ability to bond strongly with his master, training should only be started once the Mioritic puppy is already accustomed to the owner/trainer.

== History ==
The breed was provisionally recognized by the FCI on July, 6th, 2005 in Buenos Aires. Nowadays it has reached the state of definite recognition.

Its name comes from the Romanian word mioară, which means young sheep.

== Health ==
The breed has a life expectancy of about 12–14 years.

== See also ==
- List of dog breeds
- Carpathian Shepherd Dog
- Bucovina Shepherd Dog
- Romanian Raven Shepherd Dog
