= Romanian Raven Shepherd Dog =

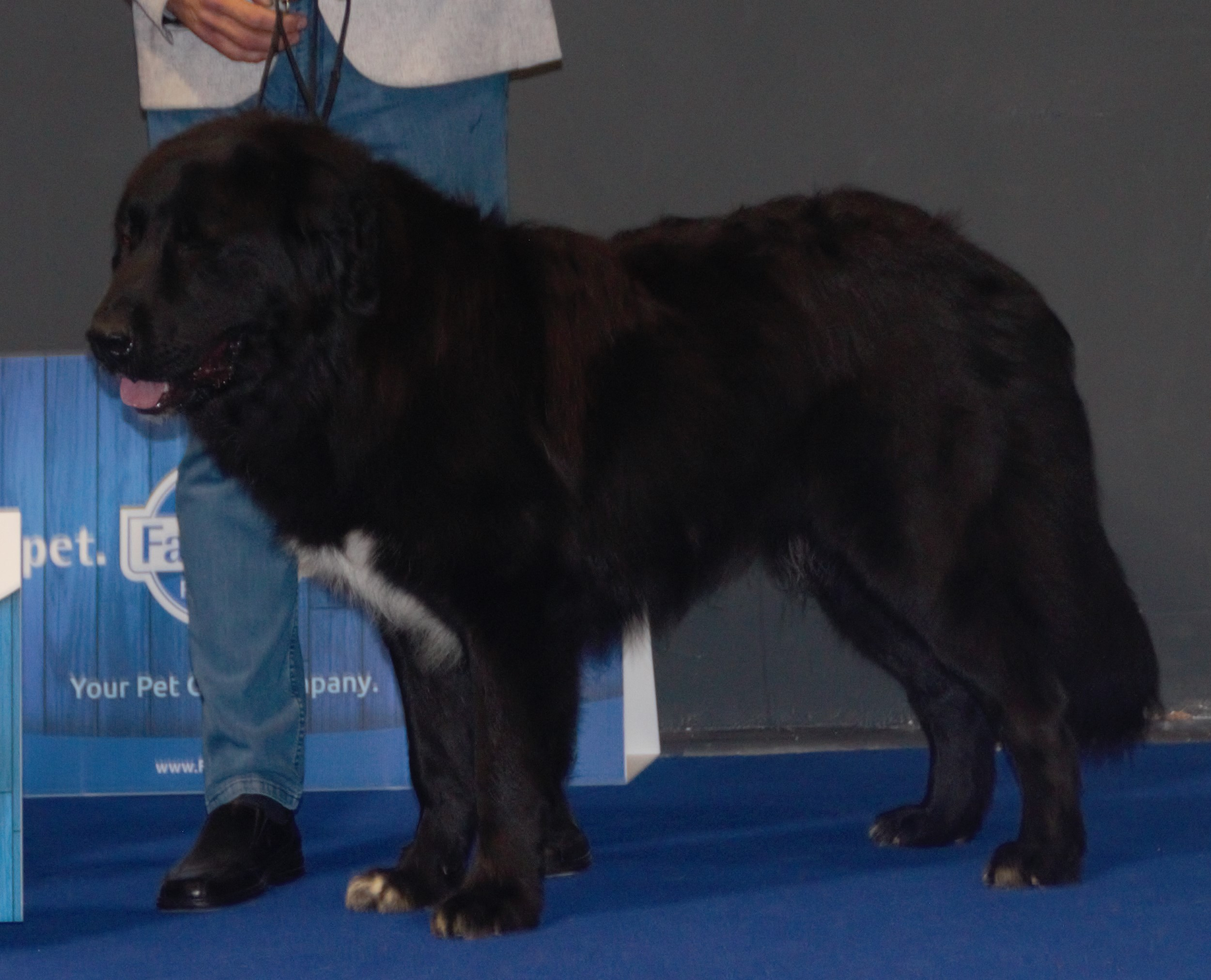
- Other names: Corb
- Origin: Romania
Traits
Height	Males	70–80 centimetres (28–31 in)
	Females	65–75 centimetres (26–30 in)
- Weight: In proportion to height
- Coat: 7–10 centimetres (2.8–3.9 in)
- Color: Black
Kennel club standards
- Romanian Kennel Club (AChR): standard
- Fédération Cynologique Internationale: standard

The Romanian Raven Shepherd Dog (Romanian: Ciobănesc Românesc Corb) is a livestock guardian dog originating in the southern and sub-Carpathian regions of Argeș County, Brașov County, Dâmbovița County, and Prahova County in Romania. They have been known for generations as "Corbi" because of their black coat. The dog was officially recognized by the Romanian Kennel Club on November 14, 2008 and by the FCI on September 17, 2024.

== History ==
The Romanian Raven Shepherd Dog is a natural breed originating in the Meridional Carpathian and Subcarpathian areal (old Muntenia region of Wallachia, within the Dâmbovița, Argeș and Prahova counties, and around Brașov). These dogs are used as watch dogs for properties and cattle herds.

They are also known as Corbi. The word "corb" means "raven" and the name bespeaks the dog's fur colour, which is a clear black.

== Temperament ==
They are known to be intelligent and active dogs. They stand out for their bravery and strong guarding instincts, which are balanced by a calm temperament around their humans. They instinctively fight wolves and bears, often necessary due to their employment at high altitude sheep farms in the Carpathian mountains. The Romanian Raven Shepherd has a very strong bark, capable of travelling great distances. They are friendly and devoted to their family, but doubtful around strangers.

== Appearance ==
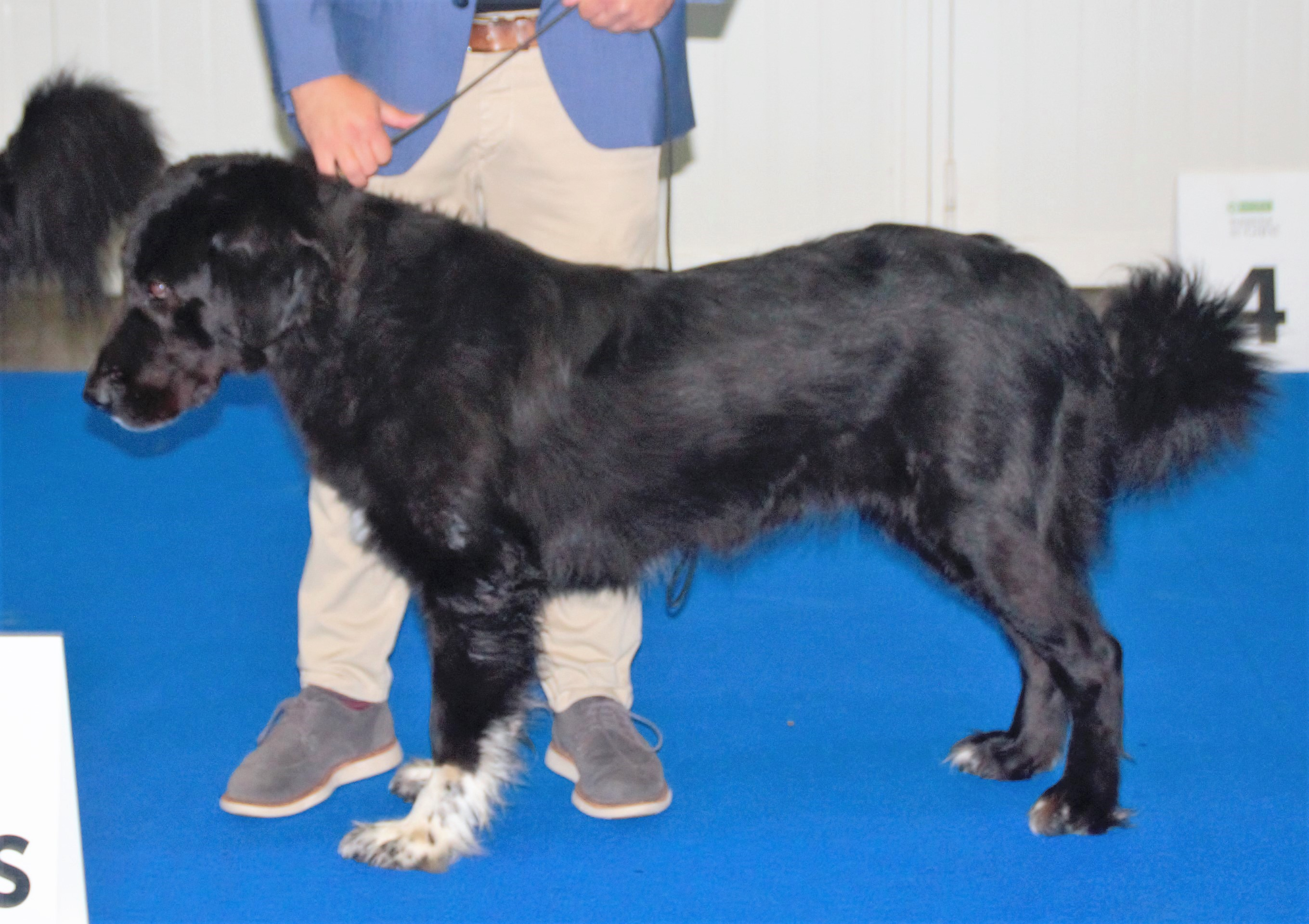
An example at a show.

The Romanian Raven Shepherd Dog is a large-sized, strong, robust and imposing breed of dog. The head is strong and solid, with a conical, well-developed snout which is shorter than the cambered skull. It has a moderate stop. The eyes are small compared with the rest of the head, almond-shaped and oblique, amber coloured, with strong pigment on the eyelids. The ears are V-shaped, caught higher than the head's level, round-tipped and floppy. The neck is thick and strong.

The body is massive and sturdy, rectangular, rather long, a bit tall and has a strong skeleton with a wide-tall chest. The tail is bushy, covered with long and thick hair. It is caught up, when it is in rest, it is floppy with the tip a bit bent and arrives until the hock's level; in alert it is upped and could surpass the back level. The nails are black or grey. The fur is double, with an underneath coating, short and bushy and an external flat one, harsher and bushier. On the head and the front side of the legs, the fur is short, while on the body it is abundant. The hair on the neck is shaggy and mane-like. The colour is black on at least 80% of the body, possible patches of a clean white may appear on the chest and legs. If overexposed to the sun during summer, the fur acquires scant reddish shades.

== See also ==
- List of dog breeds
- Guard dog
