= Pyrenees (disambiguation) =

The Pyrenees are a mountain range on the Franco-Spanish border.

Pyrenees may also refer to:

== Mountain ranges ==
- Pyrenees (Victoria), in the western region of Victoria, Australia
- Montes Pyrenaeus, on the moon

== Other uses ==
- Pyrénées station, a Paris Metro station
- Pyrenean Mountain Dog, also known as the Great Pyrenees, a dog breed
- Pyrenees (roller coaster)
- Pyrenees, Four-masted barque (prison ship)
- Shire of Pyrenees, Australia

== See also ==
- Pyrenean (disambiguation)
