= Order of the Rüdenband =

Chivalric society in central Europe

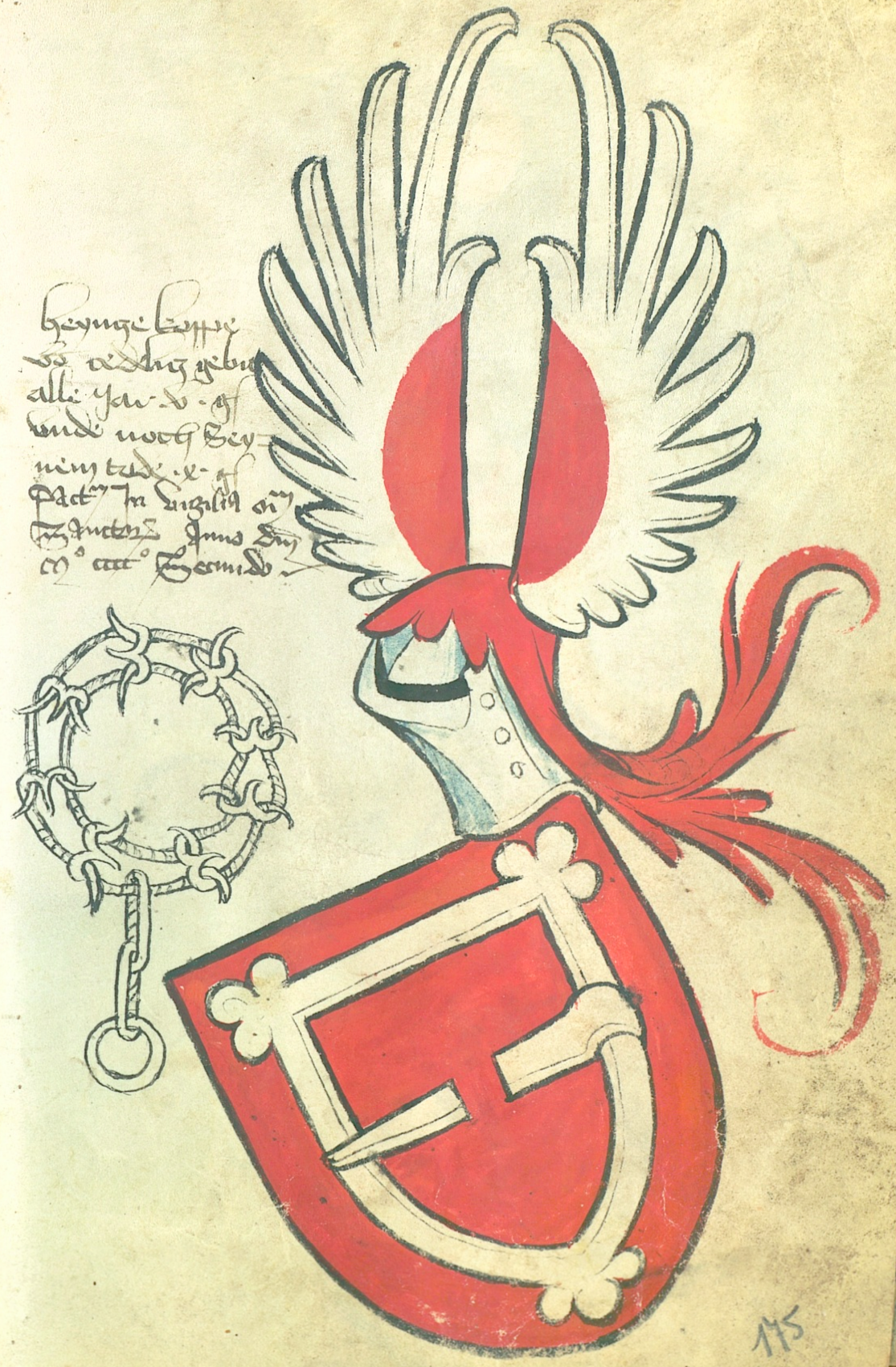
The oldest depiction of the Rüdenband badge in the armorial of St. Christoph on the Arlberg, 1402

The Order or Society of the Rüdenband (i.e. dog collar), Society with the Rüdenband, or Rüdenbänder was a chivalric society established in the late 14th century in Silesia, Upper Lusatia and Northern Bohemia. In the early 15th century it was headed by Piast Dukes of Silesia, most prominently by Louis II of Brzeg. Under him the Society of the Rüdenband gained members in Franconia, Swabia, and Austria.

== History ==
The first evidence of the Order of the Rüdenband is a gift bestowed on dy rodinbender in 1389 according to an accounting book of the city of Görlitz. Its formation was likely influenced by the establishment of the duchy of Görlitz for John of Görlitz, the youngest son of Charles IV. In 1402 some members of the Order shared the captivity of king Wenceslaus IV of Bohemia in Vienna and left their Coats of arms with the badge of the Rüdenband in the armorial of the Saint Christopher fraternity.

In 1413 a statute of association was enacted by the dukes and the senior members of the Order of the Rüdenband. The necessity for recording the statutes might have been felt, because of the dynastic tensions between Louis II of Brzeg and his half brother Henry IX of Lubin. Other occasions like the conflict between Poland and the Teutonic Order, the Plague or a feud with the Duchy of Opole have also been considered. The statutes might have been inspired by the Order of the Dragon, established in 1408 by Sigismund of Hungary. Louis II was a member of this order and a close retainer of Sigismund. Close relations of other members of the Order to the court of the future King of Germany and Bohemia have prompted historians to assume the Order an instrument of Sigismunds influence in the realm of his brother Wenceslaus.

In 1416 a Portuguese herald captured the display of the Order in Constance. The presence of Louis II and other members of the Order in Sigismunds retinue at the time of the Council of Constance likely attracted nobles and patricians from Southern Germany to join the Rüdenband. In 1420 Louis II made the young margrave John the Alchemist captain of the chapters in Franconia, Swabia and Bavaria. The new branch of the Society pledged to support the Augustinian monastery in Langenzenn. The Rüdenband could therefor have influenced the Order of the Swan created by Johns brother Frederick II in 1440.

In its prime the Order might have had 700 male and as much female members according to the travel account of Guillebert de Lannoy. Ghillebert was admitted to the Order by Louis II in 1414 when he traveled through Silesia. The leading position of Louis II and the burden placed on society by the Hussite Wars caused the Society of the Rüdenband to fade away after Louis' death in 1436. There is currently no evidence of the Society in Silesia, Bohemia and Lusatia after 1425. A last reverberation can be found in 1460, when the Constancian patrician Heinrich Blarer was depicted with the badges of the Rüdenband and the Order of the Jar.

== Statute of 1413 ==
The order of the Rüdenband committed to several rules laid down in the statutes of the order from 1413. Members of the Order of the Rüdenband were compelled to keep the peace among themselves and decide conflicts by arbitration or by judgement of one of the dukes. In quarrels with non-members, they were supposed to support each other, especially in case of captivity or inculpable harm. Only women and men of aristocratic conduct were allowed to join the Order. According to Ghillebert de Lannoy women made up half of the membership of the Order. Their admission was probably conducted in the context of Minne. Male members were only allowed to join the Order at one of its courts or tourneys.

Tourneys (hoff, literally courts) of the Order of the Rüdenband were to be held annually in Legnica or Görlitz after the feast of Saint Martin. Place and time of the tourneys could be changed by the dukes and senior members. A matching sequence of tourneys was held in November 1388 and 1389 in Legnica and Görlitz respectively. In 1413 no tourney was held, but instead a requiem was endowed at the Collegiate church in Legnica. Attendance of a requiem mass was supposed to conclude any following tourneys. All members of the Order were supposed to advertise the tourney of the Order when they join other tourneys.

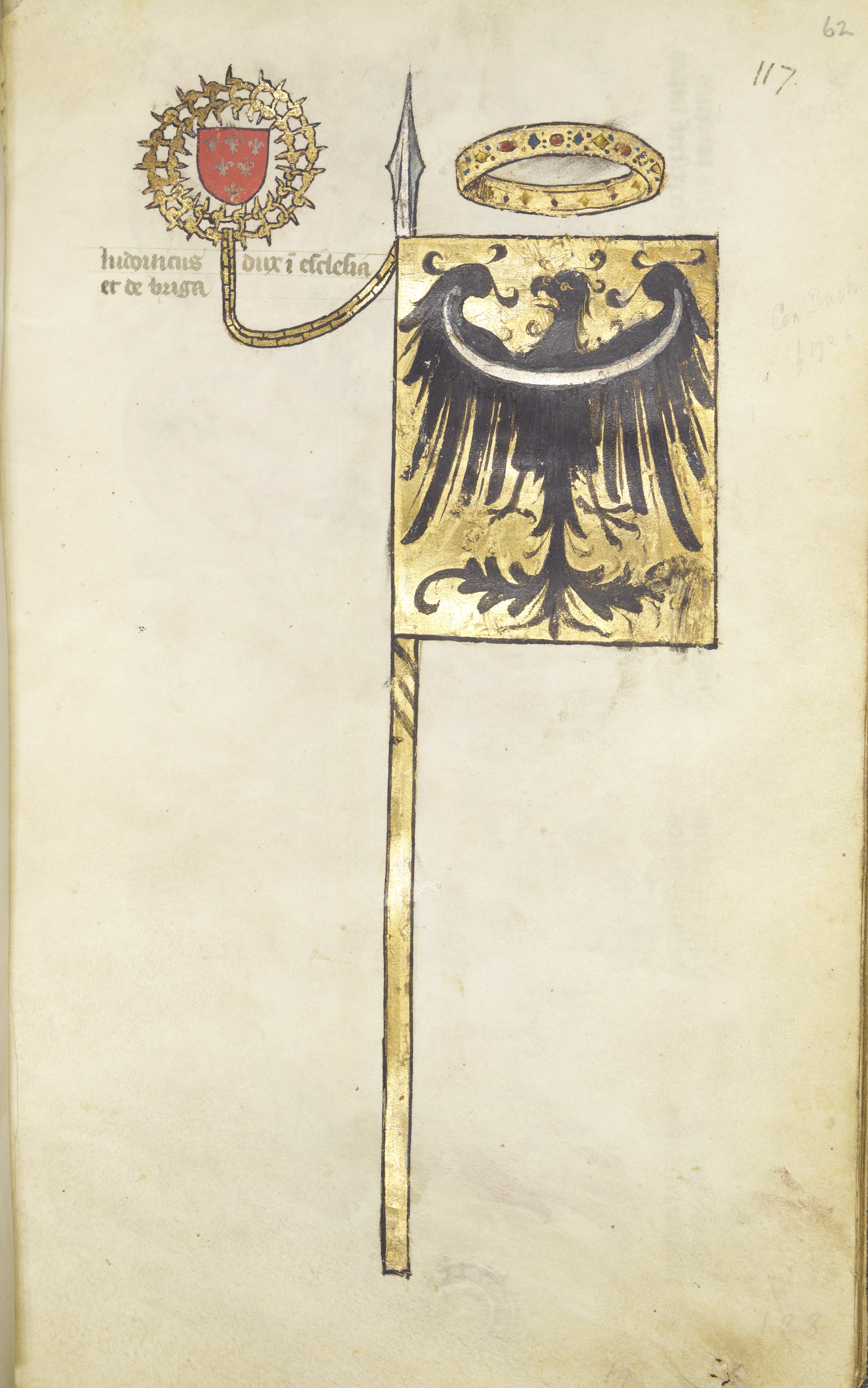
The hierarchy of the Order of the Rüdenband: The arms of the Bishop of Wrocław and tied to it the banner of Louis II of Brzeg, ca. 1416, Armorial of a Portuguese herald, Rylands Library, Latin Ms. 28.

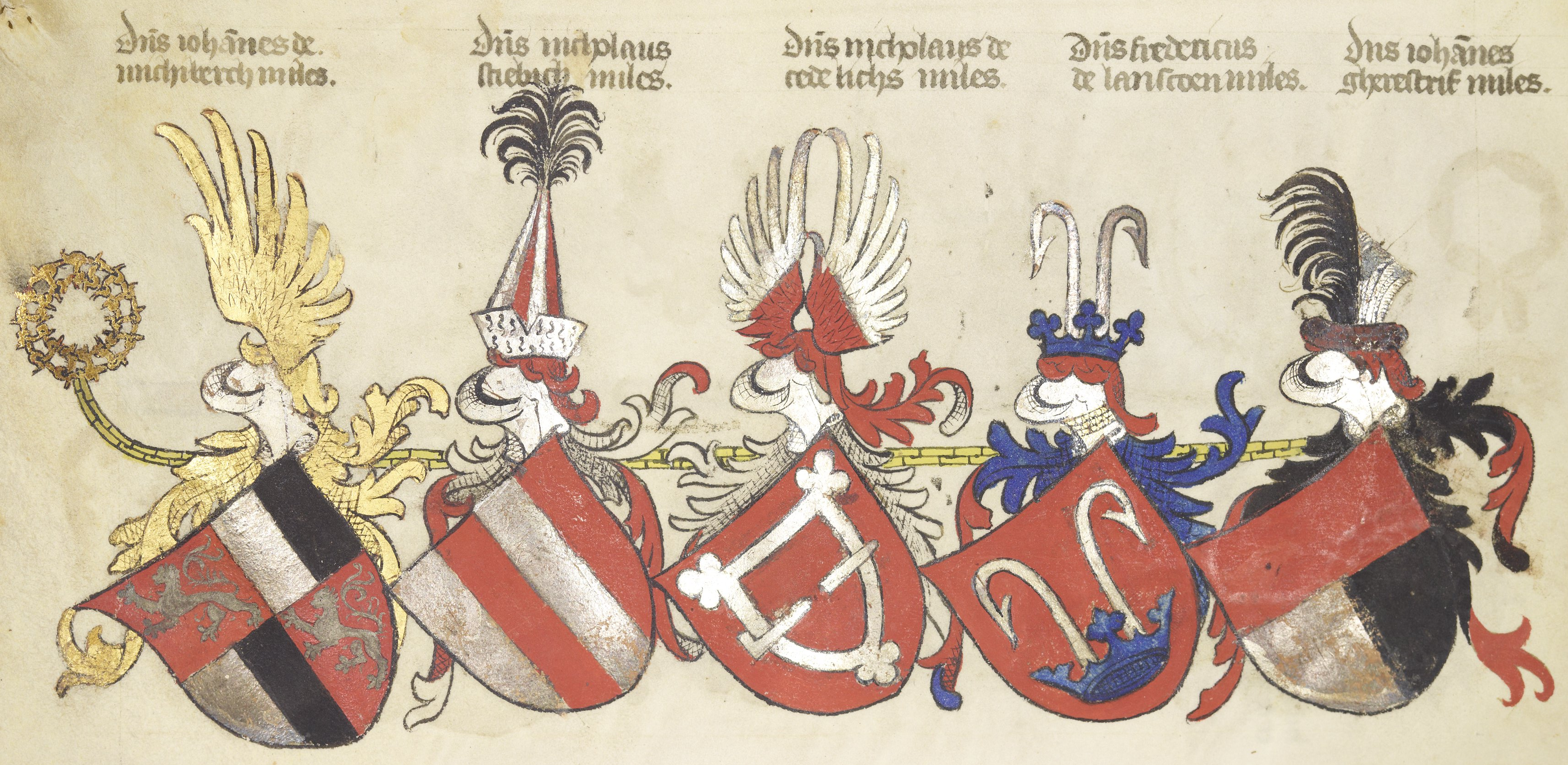
The next page shows knightly members, chained to a golden Rüdenband (Jan z Michalovic, Nicolaus von Stibitz, Nicolaus von Zedlitz, Fritz von Landskron und Hans von Gersdorff), ca. 1416, Armorial of a Portuguese herald, Rylands Library, Latin Ms. 28.

In 1413 the Order of the Rüdenband had a hierarchical structure with the bishop of Wrocław as its most prominent member, followed by the dukes, senior members and the rest of the membership. In 1420 - after the death of the former bishop - Louis II calls himself the geselleschaffte mit dem Rüdenpand oberster Haubtmann und geber (the Society of the Rüdenband supreme captain and commander). Margrave John even calls him the konig der geselschaft des Rudenpands (king of the society of the Rüdenband) in 1424. The hierarchy of the Order is also depicted in the Portuguese armorial. Members of knightly status are furthermore distinguished with golden Rüdenband-badges, while esquires are attached to silver ones.

The rank of the members is also reflected by their membership fee: 720 groschen for the bishop, 360 groschen for the dukes and 60 groschen for other members. The fee was supposed to cover for the requiem and the costs of the annual tourney. Abandoning the Order cost a fee of 180 groschen. A penalty of 12 groschen was due if a member was encountered without wearing the badge of the Rüdenband. A member could be expelled for rejecting the arbitration of a duke, for unauthorised admission of a man to the Order (though if the perpetrator were a duke, the sentence was reduced to a fine), or for engaging in unaristocratic conduct.

In 1413 the Order had 6 chapters, each headed by 4 seniors: Four chapters in Silesia, for the Duchy of Legnica, for the Duchies of Świdnica, Brzeg and Wrocław, for the Duchies of Żagań and Głogów, for the Duchies of Oleśnica and Koźle, and one each for Upper Lusatia and Bohemia.

== Heraldry ==
The badge of the Order of the Rüdenband was a spiked wolf collar. In armorials the badge is depicted either besides the coat of arms or around the shield. Depictions have been found in the Vienna manuscript of the armorial of the St. Christopher fraternity, in the Portuguese armorial John Rylands Library Latin Ms. 28, on a portrait of Heinrich Blarer in the Rosengarten museum in Constance and in the armorial of Conrad Grünenberg. In an inventory of the treasury of Frederick I, Elector of Saxony a silberin vorgult rodenband (a gilded Rüdenband made of silver) has been found among insignia of other knightly orders. A golden Rüdenband with pearls was commissioned by king Sigismund in 1418.

== Bibliography ==
- Bretschneider, Paul (1925), "Schlesische Gesellschaftsorden" [Silesian Chivalric Orders], Schlesische Monatshefte, 2 (7): 337–344.
- Kaczmarek, Romuald (1991), "Stowarzyszenie "obroźy psa gończego". Z dziejów świeckich zakonów rycerskich na średniowiecznym Śląsku" [The Society of the Rüdenband. The History of Chivalric Orders in medieval Silesia], Poznańskie-Towarzystwo Przyjaciół Nauk – Sprawozdania Wydziału Nauk o Sztuce, 108: 13–23.
- Kruse, Holger; Kamenz, Kirstin (1991), "Rüdenband (1413)", in Kruse, Holger; Paravicini, Werner; Ranft, Andreas (eds.), Ritterorden und Adelsgesellschaften im spätmittelalterlichen Deutschland, Frankfurt/Main, pp. 250–255, ISBN 978-3-631-43635-6.
- Markgraf, Hermann (1915), "Über eine schlesische Rittergesellschaft am Anfange des 15. Jahrhunderts (Rüdenband)" [About a Silesian Chivalric Society in the early 15th century (Rüdenband)], Kleine Schriften zur Geschichte Schlesiens und Breslaus, Breslau, pp. 81–95.
- Paravicini, Werner (2010), "Von Schlesien nach Frankreich, England, Spanien und zurück. Über die Ausbreitung adliger Kultur im späten Mittelalter" [From Silesia to France, England, Spain and back. About the Diffusion of noble Culture in the Late Middle Ages], in Harasimowicz, Jan; Weber, Matthias (eds.), Adel in Schlesien. Herrschaft – Kultur – Selbstdarstellung, München, pp. 135–205, ISBN 978-3-486-58877-4.
- Schumm, Marianne (1981), "Die Gesellschaft mit dem Rüdenband" [The Society with the Rüdenband], Jahrbuch des Historischen Vereins für Mittelfranken, 89: 50–56, ISSN 0341-9339.
- Spieß, Philipp Ernst (1783), "Von der Gesellschaft mit dem Rüdenband" [About the Society with the Rüdenband], Archivische Nebenarbeiten und Nachrichten vermischten Inhalts mit Urkunden, vol. 1, Halle, pp. 101–103.
