= Martingale =

Martingale may refer to:

- Martingale (probability theory), a stochastic process in which the conditional expectation of the next value, given the current and preceding values, is the current value
- Martingale (tack) for horses
- Martingale (collar) for dogs and other animals
- Martingale (betting system), in 18th century France
- a dolphin striker, a spar aboard a sailing ship
- In the sport of fencing, a martingale is a strap attached to the sword handle to prevent a sword from being dropped if disarmed
- In the theatrical lighting industry, martingale is an obsolete term for a twofer, or occasionally a threefer
- Martingale (clothing), a strap controlling the fullness of the clothing material.

See also:

- Martin Gale, English-Irish artist
