= Pyrenean =

Pyrenean refers to things of or from the Pyrenees, a mountain range dividing France and Spain, with Andorra in the middle.

Pyrenean may also refer to:

- Pyrenean Shepherd, a medium-small breed of dog native to the Pyrenees mountains in southern France and northern Spain
- Pyrenean Mountain Dog or Great Pyrenees, a large breed of dog used as a livestock guardian dog
- Pyrenean Mastiff, a large breed of dog originally from the Aragonese Pyrenees in Spain
- Pyrenean ibex, a species of wild goat that became extinct in January 2000
