= Pyrenean Mastiff =

Spanish breed of dog

Pyrenean Mastiff; Mastín del Pirineo
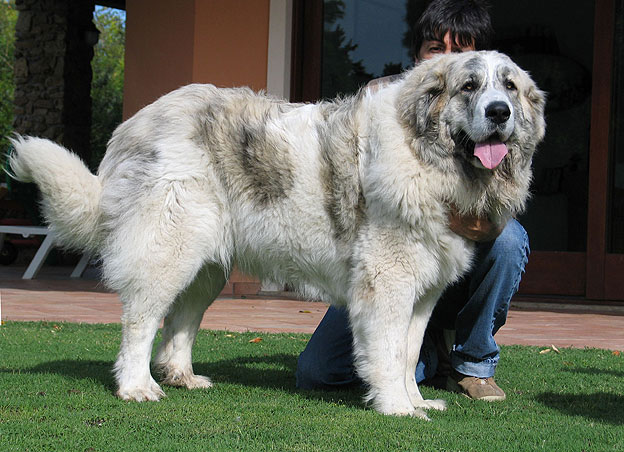
- Other names: Spanish: Mastín del Pirineo; Aragonese: Mastí dell'Aragó; Mostín; Mostín d'Aragón; Mostín d'o Pireneu; Catalan: Gos ramader
- Origin: Spain
Traits
Height	Males	minimum 77 cm
	Females	minimum 72 cm
- Weight: 60–90 kg
Kennel club standards
- Real Sociedad Canina de España: standard
- Fédération Cynologique Internationale: standard

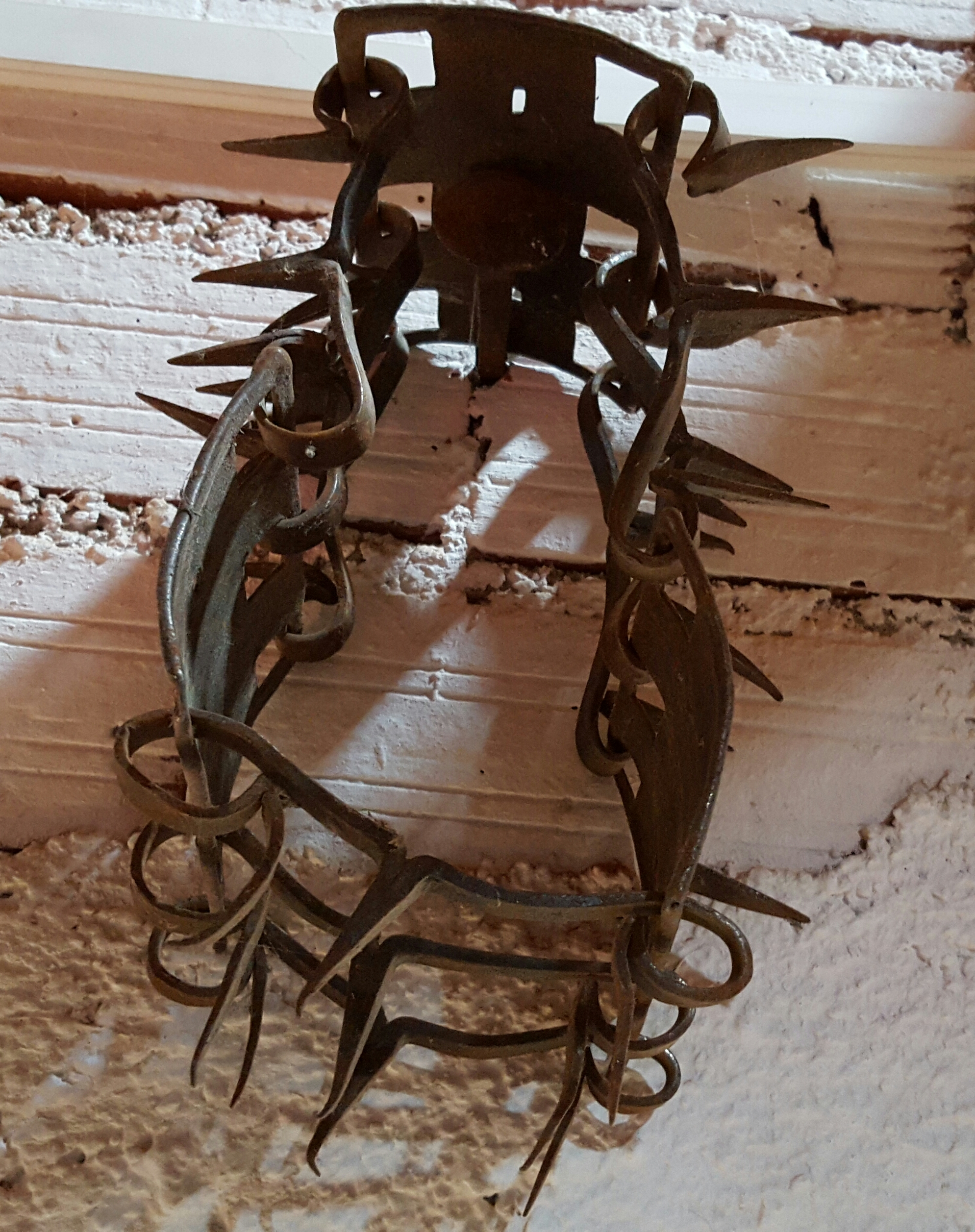
A Spanish carlanca or wolf collar

The Pyrenean Mastiff or Mastín del Pirineo is a Spanish breed of large livestock guardian dog from the autonomous community of Aragón in north-eastern Spain. It was traditionally used to protect flocks during the annual transhumance to high summer pasture in the Pyrenees. It is a distinct and separate breed from the Spanish Mastiff or Mastin Español and from both the Pyrenean Mountain Dog and the Pyrenean Shepherd.

== History ==
The Pyrenean Mastiff originated in the historic Kingdom of Aragon, where it has been documented since the Middle Ages. Its origins and purpose were in the annual transhumance of flocks to the high pastures of the Pyrenees for the summer months, and the return to lower ground for the winter. The dogs were kept with the sheep from an early age; their job was to protect the flocks from predators, and in particular from wolves. Like other European flock guardian breeds, they were often fitted with a spiked metal wolf collar or carlanca for extra protection.

Three of the dogs were shown in Madrid in 1890. In the first edition of the Libro de Orígenes Español (Madrid, 1913), the second entry for dogs registered in 1912 is a "Mastín Español del Pirineo".

In the latter 1940s the wolf disappeared from the Pyrenees, and once it was no longer needed for its principal function, the breed began to decline. It was fully accepted by the Fédération Cynologique Internationale in 1954. In 1977 a breed society, the Club del Mastín del Pirineo, was formed; the dogs gradually became diffused through much of Spain, and later spread to other countries in Europe and the Americas, and to Australia and Japan.

In 2026 it was among the sixteen Spanish breeds considered by the Real Sociedad Canina de España to be vulnerable.

== Characteristics ==
The Pyrenean Mastiff is a very large dog. The minimum acceptable height at the withers for dogs is 77 cm (30 in), and for bitches 72 cm (28 in); there is no upper limit, and larger dogs are preferred. They have a heavy white coat with a mask of a darker colour, and often with patches of the same colour on the body; the ears always have darker spots. The weight varies between about 60 kg (130 lb) and 90 kg (200 lb).

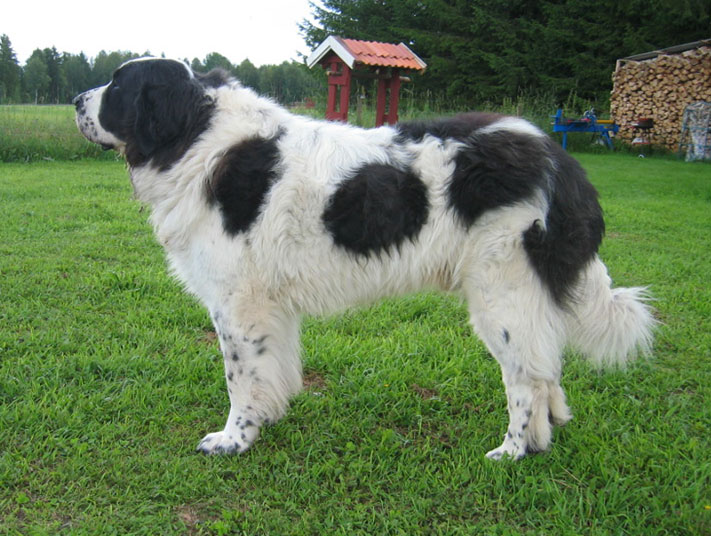
Dog

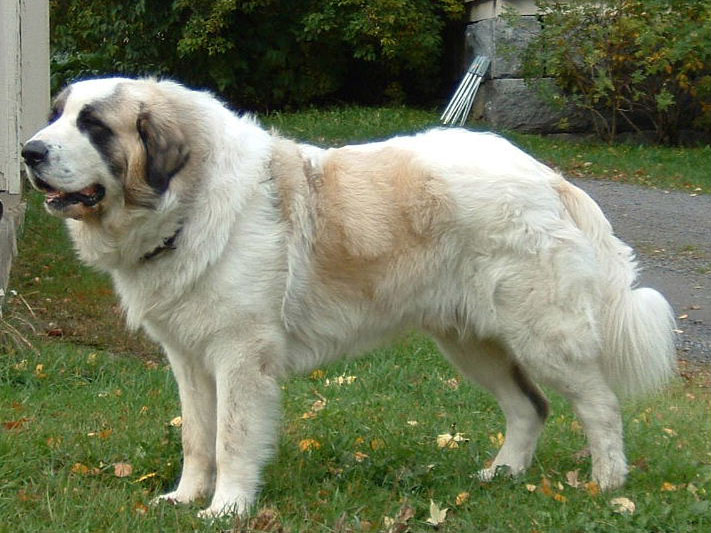
Bitch
