= Dog collar =

Piece of material put around the neck of a dog

A dog collar is a piece of material put around the neck of a dog. A collar may be used for restraint, identification, fashion, protection, or training (although some aversive training collars are illegal in many countries). Identification tags and medical information are often placed on dog collars. Collars are often used in conjunction with a leash for restraining a dog. Collars can be traumatic to the trachea if the dog pulls against the restraint of the leash, causing severe pressure to the neck. Use of a harness instead of a collar may be beneficial for dogs prone to tracheitis or those with a collapsed trachea. Conversely, dog breeds with slender necks or smaller heads may easily slip out of collars that are too loose. This can be avoided by using a martingale dog collar which tightens to distribute pressure around the neck when training the dog not to pull. Any style of dog collar must be properly fitted to ensure safety and collars should not be worn when the dog is unattended.

== Basic collars ==
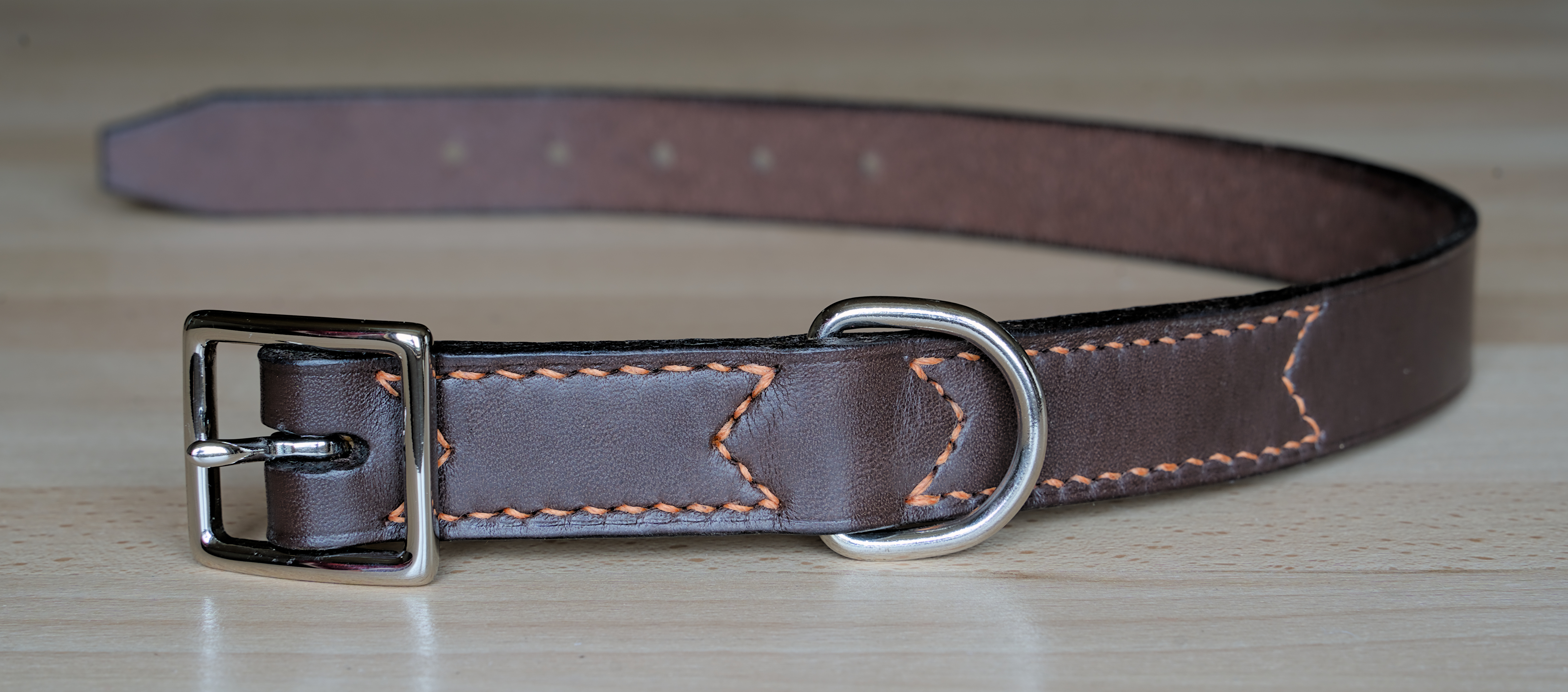
Leather buckle collar with traditional buckle.

Collars are made with a variety of materials, most commonly leather or nylon webbing. Less common materials can include polyester, hemp, metal, or "oilcloth" (vinyl woven with cotton). Collars can be decorated in a variety of ways with a variety of materials. The basic collars for everyday wear are:

- Buckle collars, also called flat collars, with a buckle similar to a belt buckle, or a quick-release buckle, either of which holds the collar loosely around the dog's neck. Identification is commonly attached to such a collar; it also comes with a loop to which a leash can be fastened. This is the most standard collar for dogs. A flat collar should fit comfortably tight on the dog's neck. It should not be so tight as to choke the dog nor so loose that they can slip out of it. Generally, two fingers should be able to fit underneath the collar.

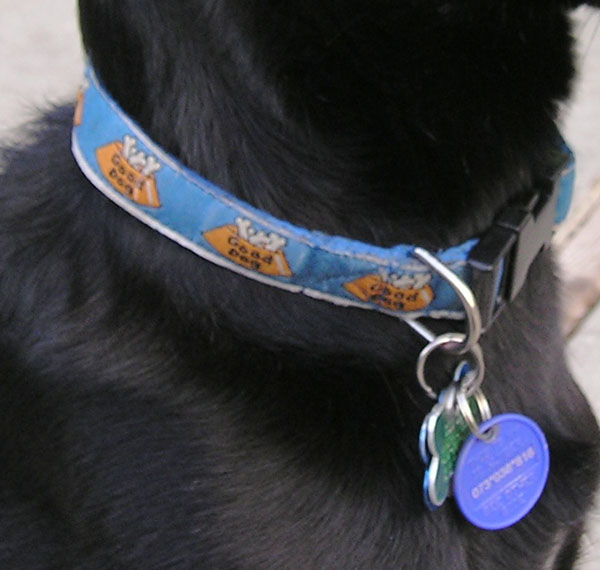
Nylon quick-release buckle collar with identification and medical tags.

- Break-away collars look similar to buckle collars, but have a safety mechanism installed that allows the dog to break free of the collar if excessive force is applied. These collars are useful in situations where a non-quick release collar could get snagged and strangle the dog.
- Safety stretch collars contain an elastic panel in the sturdy nylon collar, which allows escape from potential strangulation dangers such as branches, fences, gates and other dogs. Unlike breakaways, a stretch collar acts like a traditional collar when clipped with a leash.

== Special-purpose collars and attachments ==
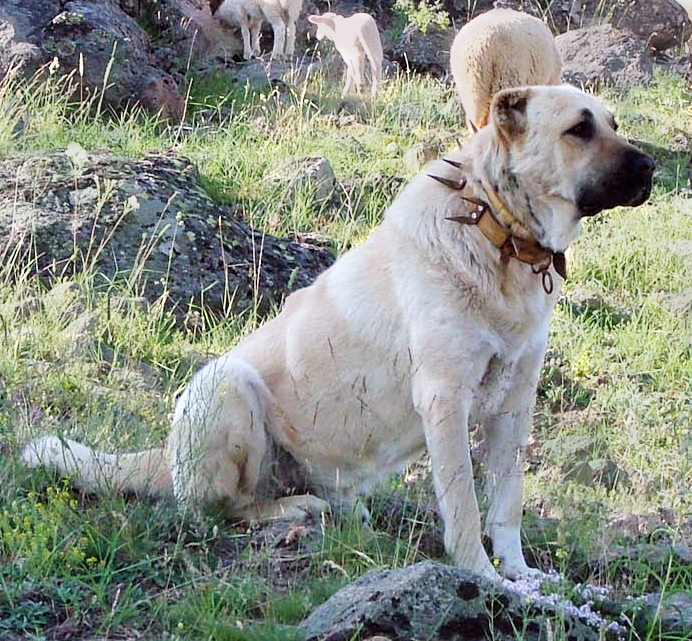
Kangal dog with wolf collar protecting sheep

- Stud collars, also called wolf collars, protection collars, or spiked collars depending on the attachments, are collars fitted with metal studs, dulled points, or sharp points that traditionally prevented another animal from biting the dog's neck. Commonly, spikes are hand-set and tightly riveted for extra security. This type of collar dates back to ancient Greece, when dogs protecting livestock were given nail-studded collars to protect them from wolves or other predators. In modern societies, stud collars are more commonly considered a fashion accessory.
- Reflective collars, usually made with nylon webbing, incorporate reflective tape that ensures that the dog will be seen at night by approaching vehicles.
- A lighted collar (or collar light, dog light) is a collar that emits light in order to make a dog more visible in the dark to their owners and more importantly, nearby motorists. It is not designed to help a dog see at night, as it is well documented that dogs have very good vision in low light conditions. Most lighted collars utilize one or more light emitting diodes for the light source and can be of virtually any color, although red and blue are most common. Power is provided by one or more batteries, most common types being AAA and lithium coin cells to minimize the added weight to the collar.
- A flotation collar (or buoyant collar) is a buoyancy aid designed for dogs. Although it is not designed to be used as a life preserver or life jacket, it can provide additional buoyant support for the head of a dog when in the water. It is often used in canine hydrotherapy services to assist in the rehabilitation of injured dogs. The collar may be constructed of closed cell foam material that is inherently buoyant or be of a type that is inflated with air.

== Medical collars ==
- Flea collars are impregnated with chemicals that repel fleas. They are usually a supplementary collar, worn in addition to the conventional buckle collar.
- Elizabethan collars, shaped like a truncated cone, can be fitted on a dog to prevent it from scratching a wound on its head or neck or licking a wound or infection on its body.

== Fashion collars ==
Dog collars are also used to convey the owner's style and have been used as a status symbol. The oldest known fashionable dog collars come from ancient Egypt, dating back to before the earliest of the Pharaohs. Today's fashionable dog collars come in a wide variety of designs, patterns and materials and may include accessories, such as bow ties and flowers. As of 2023, the "Amour Amour" is the world's most expensive dog collar, it is studded with diamonds and costs $3.2 million.

== Training collars ==
Several types of collars are used for the purposes of training dogs, though sometimes a collar is not used at all (such as in the case of dog agility training, where a collar could get caught on equipment and strangle the dog). Each training collar has its own set of advantages and disadvantages (briefly outlined below) which trainers might consider before using a select one. Training collars are typically used for training only and not left on the dog's neck all the time, as some collars can be harmful or dangerous if left on a dog unsupervised.

=== Flat collars ===
Some dogs are trained on leash using a buckle or quick-release collar.

=== Martingale collar ===
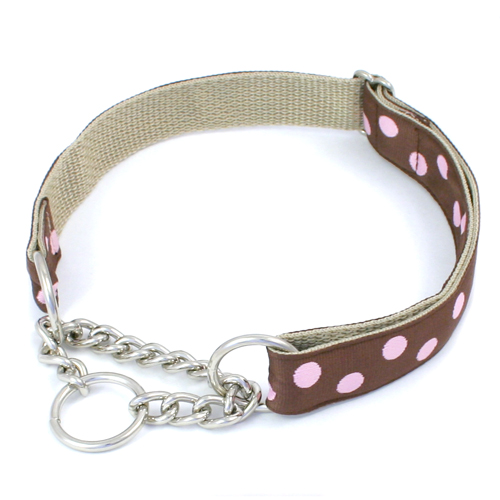
Martingale Collar with Chain Loop; martingale collars also come with a fabric loop instead of chain as well as optional buckles on both styles.

Martingale collars are recommended for sighthounds because their heads are smaller than their necks and they can often slip out of standard collars. They can, however, be used for any breed of dog. Their no-slip feature has made them a safety standard at many kennels and animal shelters. A martingale collar has 2 loops; the smaller loop is the "control loop" that tightens the larger loop when pulled to prevent dogs from slipping out of the collar. A correctly adjusted martingale does not constrict the dog's neck when pulled taut. Others use them fitted snugly to be able to use them in a similar manner to a choke chain but without the unlimited constriction of a choke chain. The structure allows the collar to be loose and comfortable, but tightens if the dog attempts to back out of it.

=== Head halters ===
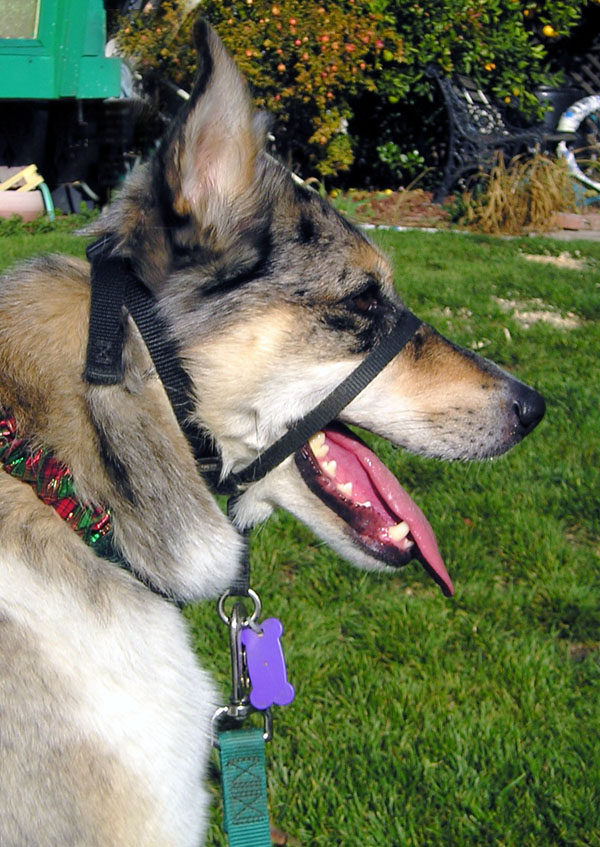
The halter-style collar controls the dog's head but does not restrict its ability to pant, drink, or grasp objects.

Head halters, also called head collars, are similar in design to a halter for a horse. They are sold under several brand names. Brands include Comfort Trainer, Canny Collar, Halti, Gentle Leader, and Snoot Loop amongst several others. Brand names are also used when referring to these collars most commonly Halti or Gentle Leader. This device fastens around the back of the neck and over the top of the muzzle, giving more control over a dog's direction and the intensity of pulling on a leash than most collars that fit strictly around the neck. Pressure on this type of collar pulls the dog's nose and consequently their head towards the handler. These types of collars can aid in stopping a strong dog from pulling an owner in an unsafe direction. They are also recommended for dogs that pull as the pressure will no longer be directly on their wind pipe.

The theory behind the utility of head halters is that if you have control of the head, you have control of the body. The head collar generally consists of two loops, one behind the ears and the other over the nose. This tool generally makes it more difficult for the dog to pull on its leash. This is a management tool only, it does not train the dog not to pull.

==== Controversy ====
Supporters of the head halter say that it enables the handler to control the dog's head, and makes the dog unable to pull using its full strength. They claim it is especially useful with reactive dogs, where control of the dog's head can be a safety issue.

Those who do not recommend use of the head halter say that some dogs find it unnatural and uncomfortable. If the collar is too tight, it may dig too deeply into the skin or the strap around the muzzle may push into the dog's eyes. Cervical injury is a possible result from improper use of the head halter; if a dog is jerked suddenly by the leash attached to the head halter, the dog's nose is pulled sharply to the side, which might result in neck injury. If the nose strap is fitted too tightly, the hair on the muzzle can also be rubbed off, or the dog might paw and scratch at its face, causing injuries ranging from mere bare skin to severe abrasions.

Some head halters such as the Canny Collar attach behind the neck and tighten around the nose when the dog pulls to deter the dog from pulling. Manufacturers claim they are safer than halters that attach below the muzzle because they do not pull the dog's head to one side, avoiding stress on the neck area. Some rear-fastening head halters can have the noseband removed during use, therefore providing an element of training the dog to eventually walk on a regular collar and lead.

=== Aversive collars ===
Aversive collars use levels of pain to encourage a dog to modify unwanted behaviors. The use of aversive collars is controversial, and the Association of Professional Dog Trainers and the American Veterinary Society for Animal Behavior prohibits their use. Many European countries have made shock collars illegal. Some countries have made prong collars illegal, and some have made choke collars illegal.

A meta-review of 17 peer-reviewed studies found that "The results show that using aversive training methods (e.g., positive punishment and negative reinforcement) can jeopardize both the physical and mental health of dogs."

==== Shock collars ====
Shock collars (also called e-collars, remote training collars, electric collars, zap collars, or hunting collars) consist of a radio receiver attached to a collar with battery and electrodes and a transmitter that the trainer holds. When triggered, the collar delivers the aversive of electrical stimulation to cause pain to the neck of a dog.

Shock collars are illegal in Spain, Germany, Austria, and Denmark, Netherlands, Iceland, Norway, Sweden Slovenia and Switzerland, Portugal, Wales, the province of Quebec in Canada, some states in Australia, and England.

Shock collars will be banned in Flanders in Belgium after 2027.

Some shock collar models also include a tone or vibrational setting, as an alternative to or in conjunction with the shock. Early shock collars provided only a single, high-level shock. "Although collar-produced shock can cause acute pain, the painful event does not and cannot produce physical injury". However, meta-studies have shown that they produce stress, cause pain, and damage the relationship between dog and owner. A leash or lead is not attached to a shock collar because it can pull the contacts too close to the dog's skin, causing lessened effectiveness of the collar and additional discomfort.

==== Prong collars ====
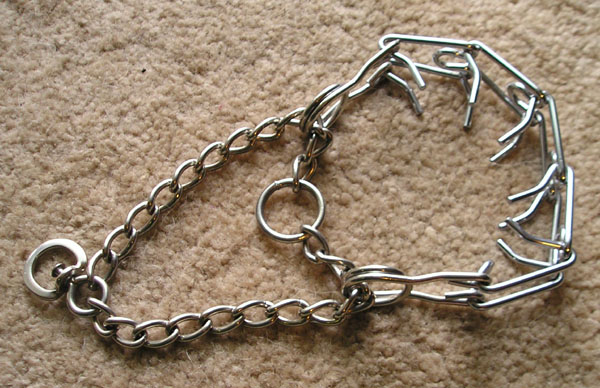
Prong collar; the looped chain limits how tightly the collar can pull in the same way that a Martingale functions.

Prong collars, also called a pinch collar, are a series of metal links that fit together by connecting through blunt prongs that point inward toward the dog's neck. They "train by negative experience, that is inflicting pain". The German Animal Welfare Act goes further, stating that they train by causing "significant pain, suffering or harm to the animal.

Prong collars are illegal in Spain,Sweden; Austria; Switzerland; and Germany, as well as Victoria, Australia.

Even in countries where they are legal, some dog training organizations do not allow members to use them. "Organizations advocating against the use of prong and choke collars include: CHS, RSPCA UK, RSPCA Australia, RSPCA South Australia, the Canadian Advisory Council on National Shelter Standards, CVMA, ACVB, ABTC, APDT UK, and APDT".

Prong collars can easily injure the thyroid gland, the salivary glands, and the salivary lymph nodes.

The design of the prong collar incorporates a chain loop connecting the ends of the prong series, such that it has a limited circumference (a martingale), unlike choke chains, which do not have a limit on how far they can constrict on a dog's neck. The leash attaches to this chain section. There are two options on the prong collar for leash attachment, the dead ring and the live ring. The live ring is used when a dog needs more correction as it gives more slack when the leash is popped. The dead ring is used most commonly when first training a dog to use a prong. The leash is attached to both rings and as such there is not as much slack as when attached to the live ring. This section commonly has a swivel at the point of attachment to lessen the twisting and possible tangling of the leash.

Like the choke chain, the prong collar is placed high on the dog's neck, just behind the ears, at a point where nerve endings are less padded (to cause more pain with less effort by the handler). This is perhaps one of the most misportrayed factors of "proper" prong collar use; the fit and placement of the prong collar are used to make the tool seem like something only used by more knowledgeable people. The collar is designed to prevent the dog from pulling by applying pressure on smaller contact points around the dog's neck as this causes pain. The limited traction of the martingale chain combined with the angle of the prongs prevents the prongs moving close enough to cause injury physically. Unlike flat, martingale, or slip choke collars the prong protects the trachea as a bonus to causing pain. It is used as a brief "corrective" tug which brings the dog's mind back to the handler by making them experience pain.

Prong collars must never be turned inside out (with the prongs facing away from the dog's skin), as this may cause injury against the body and head. Further, one should never use to yank a dog back, choke, or hang/suspend a dog. They are used as "corrective" tools despite dogs having no concept of "good" and "bad". Footage of this collar being actively used typically shows a dog with common signs of pain (ears pointed back, lip licking, raised eyebrows and "stress lines" on the face)

At times, plastic tips are occasionally placed on the ends of the prongs to protect against catching the fur and pulling tufts, or in the case of low-quality collars with rough or chisel-cut ends\, irritating or perhaps puncturing the skin. Its important to examine the tips of the prongs to ensure they are rounded and smooth regardless if they have rubber tips so that they only cause pain and not visible injury.

==== Force collars ====
Force collars are leather with metal prongs or studs lining the inside; similar in effect to prong collars.

==== Choke chains ====
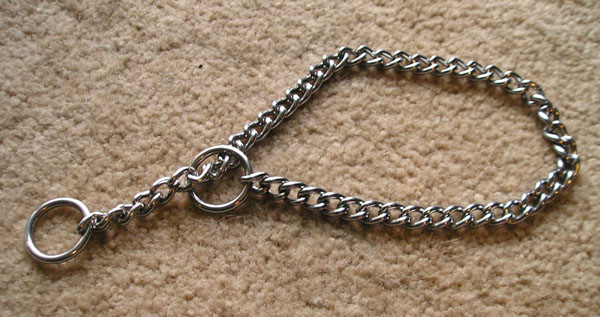
Choke chain, showing how the chain pulls through the loop at one end.

Choke chains (also called choke collars, slip chains, check collars, or training collars) are a length of chain with rings at either end such that the collar can be formed into a loop that slips over the dogs head and typically rests around the top of the dog's neck, "designed to administer negative reinforcement and positive punishment.". "When the dog pulls on the lead, the chain tightens around the dog's neck causing pain".

Choke chains are illegal in Spain, and Switzerland Even where legal, some professional dog training associations prohibit them.

When the leash is attached to the "dead" ring, the collar does not constrict on the dog's neck. When the leash is attached to the "live" ring, the chain slips (adjusts) tighter when pulled and slips looser when tension is released. Training with this leash involves a quick jerk with an immediate release, called a "leash pop", "snap", or "correction" to correct a dog's unwanted behavior through punishment. If force is applied to produce discomfort and then released when the dog complies, this is called "negative reinforcement". Pulling harder or longer on the choke chain presses on the dog's trachea and/or larynx and may restrict breathing.

Fur saver collars are a kind of choke chain that contain fewer and longer individual links than a close link chain, also known as a long link fur saver collar. Fur saver collars can be used both for long and short-haired breeds limiting damage to the dog's fur. It can be used for training and daily use as well. The fur saver collar can be 'locked out' preventing it from constricting by attaching the leash connector to any link within the chain, this mitigates the unlimited traction effect associated with a slip chain.

==== Humane bark collars ====
There are dog bark collars that use a combination of vibrations and sounds. One peer-reviewer study showed these collars to be effective without causing stress.

== See also ==
- Muzzle (device)
- Dog harness
- Dog training
- Cat collar
