= Pyrenean Mountain Dog =

French breed of dog

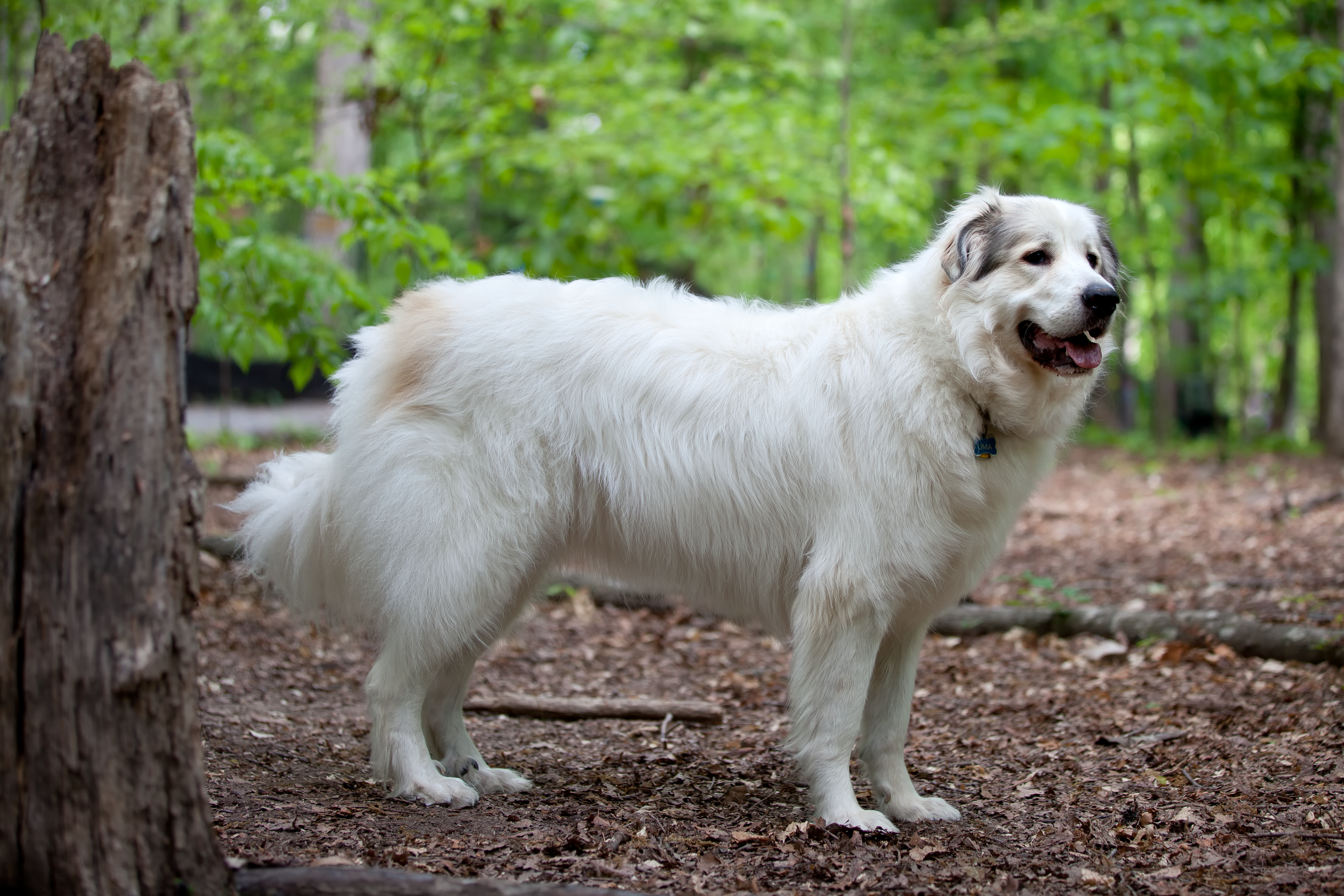
- Other names: Chien de Montagne des Pyrénées; Great Pyrenees; Pyrenean Herding Dog
- Common nicknames: Patou
- Origin: France, Spain, Andorra
Traits
Height	Males	70–80 cm (28–31 in)
	Females	65–75 cm (26–30 in)
- Weight: 55–75 kg (120–165 lb)
- Coat: long, thick double coat
- Colour: white, with or without patches of badger, wolf-grey or reddish tan on the head and up to a third of the body
Kennel club standards
- Société Centrale Canine: standard
- Fédération Cynologique Internationale: standard

The Pyrenean Mountain Dog (Chien de Montagne des Pyrénées) is a French breed of livestock guardian dog. In France, it is commonly called the Patou. It is known as the Great Pyrenees in the US. The breed originates from the eastern or French side of the Pyrenees Mountains (which separate France and Spain). It is recognised as a separate breed from the Mastín del Pirineo or Pyrenean Mastiff from the Spanish side of the mountains, but they are closely related.

The Patou is widely used throughout France as a livestock guardian, particularly in the French Alps and the Pyrenees, protecting flocks from predation by wolves and bears. In the US, it is also used to protect flocks from various predators.

== History ==
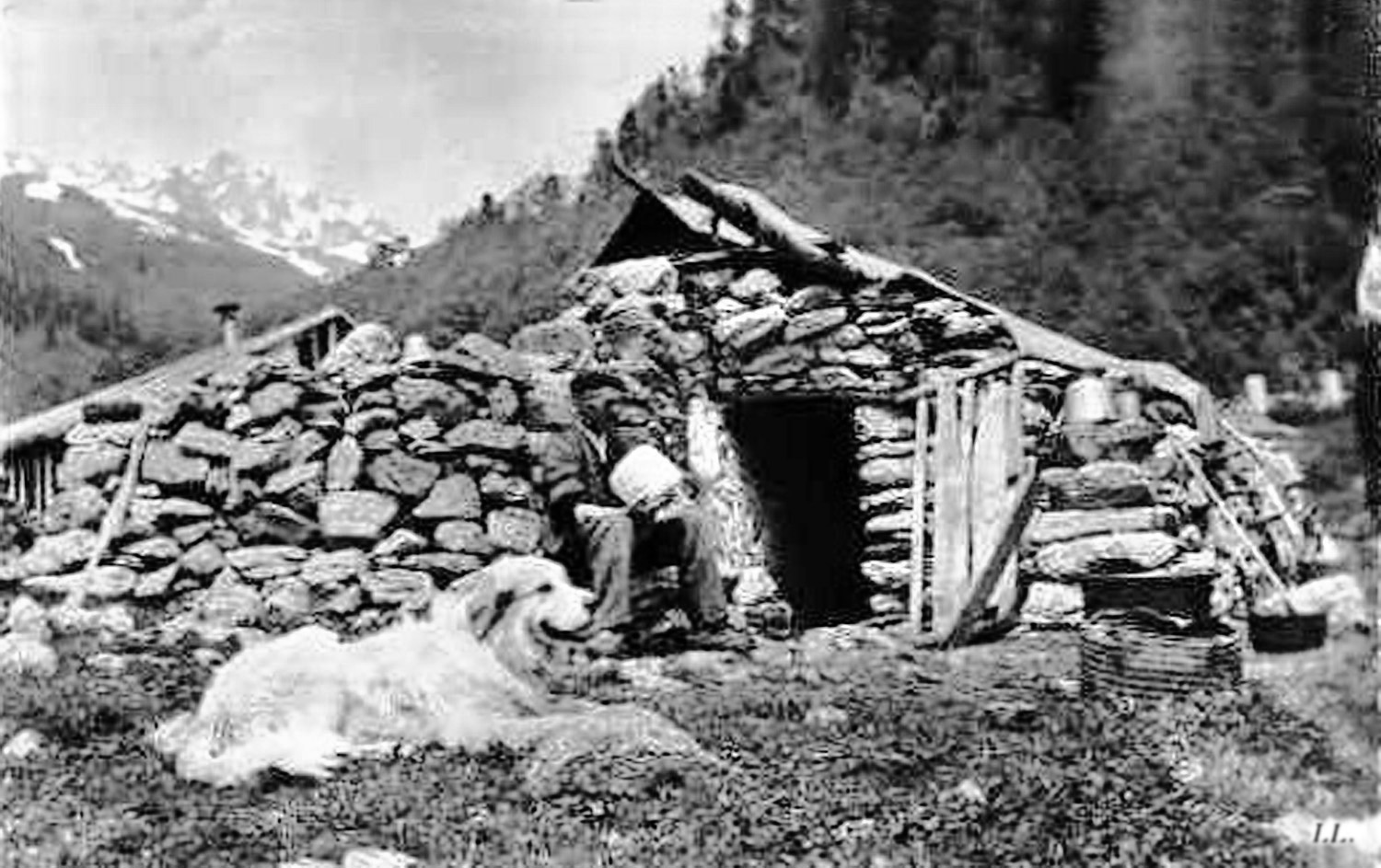
At a mountain hut, early twentieth century

The French name Patou derives from pâtre, meaning shepherd. It is sometimes claimed that the breed’s ancestors — along with those of the closely related Pyrenean Mastiff — were white livestock guardian dogs brought from Asia during Roman times, linking them to the Maremmano-Abruzzese Sheepdog of Italy and the Kuvasz of Hungary. Genomic analyses place the Pyrenean Mountain Dog within the same genetic clade as the Pharaoh Hound, Cirneco dell'Etna, and the Ibizan Hound.

In the 17th century, Madame de Maintenon and Louis, Dauphin of France brought a dog of this type to the court of King Louis XIV, where it quickly became fashionable; Louis XIV even designated it the Royal Dog of France. The breed was also used by the French nobility to guard their châteaux, particularly in the south. It is sometimes suggested that French settlers brought these dogs to Canada, where they may have contributed to the ancestry of the Newfoundland breed. In the 1830s, Pyrenean Mountain Dogs were among the foundation breeds used in developing the Leonberger.

After wolves were extirpated from the Pyrenees in the 19th century, the breed’s numbers declined sharply, and by the early 20th century it was close to extinction. Some shepherds sold pups to tourists, and a few dogs were taken to Britain, where several were registered with The Kennel Club, although interest in such a large breed waned during the First World War. A French aristocrat and canine authority, Bernard Senac-Lagrange, is credited with rescuing the breed at this time. He travelled through the mountains to locate high-quality specimens and used them to establish a new breeding base. In 1923, he founded the breed club Réunion des Amateurs de Chiens Pyrénées and drafted the first breed standard. That same year, he registered the breed as the Chien de Montagne des Pyrénées with the Société Centrale Canine. In 1946, the Real Sociedad Canina de España recognised the Mastín del Pirineo (Pyrenean Mastiff) as the large white livestock guardian dog of the southern, Spanish side of the Pyrenees, establishing a separate standard. The Chien de Montagne des Pyrénées received definitive acceptance from the Fédération Cynologique Internationale in 1955.

In the early 1930s, the breed was exported to North America, where it became known as the Great Pyrenees and gained popularity in the show ring in both Canada and the United States. In 1935, the American Kennel Club adopted a new breed standard that differed in several respects from the French original, promoting exaggerations of certain physical traits that would not have been permitted in France. This standard was later adopted by The Kennel Club in Great Britain. Concerned about the perceived deterioration of show lines, the British Pyrenean Mountain Dog Breed Club issued a brochure in 2011 advising judges not to reward overly glamorous, heavy-bodied, short-muzzled dogs over leaner, more functional examples with weatherproof coats suited to work in mountainous regions.

== Description ==
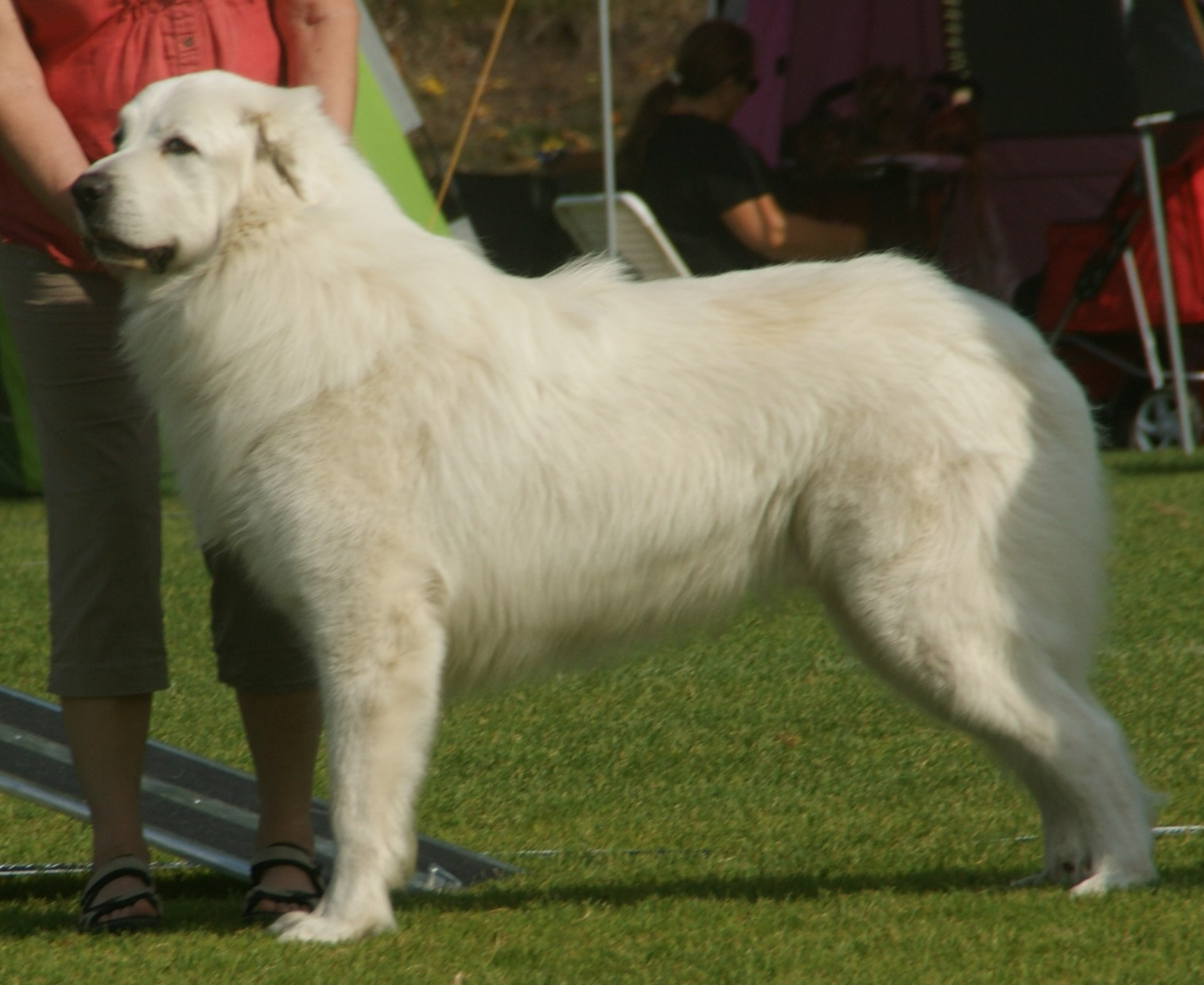
The white

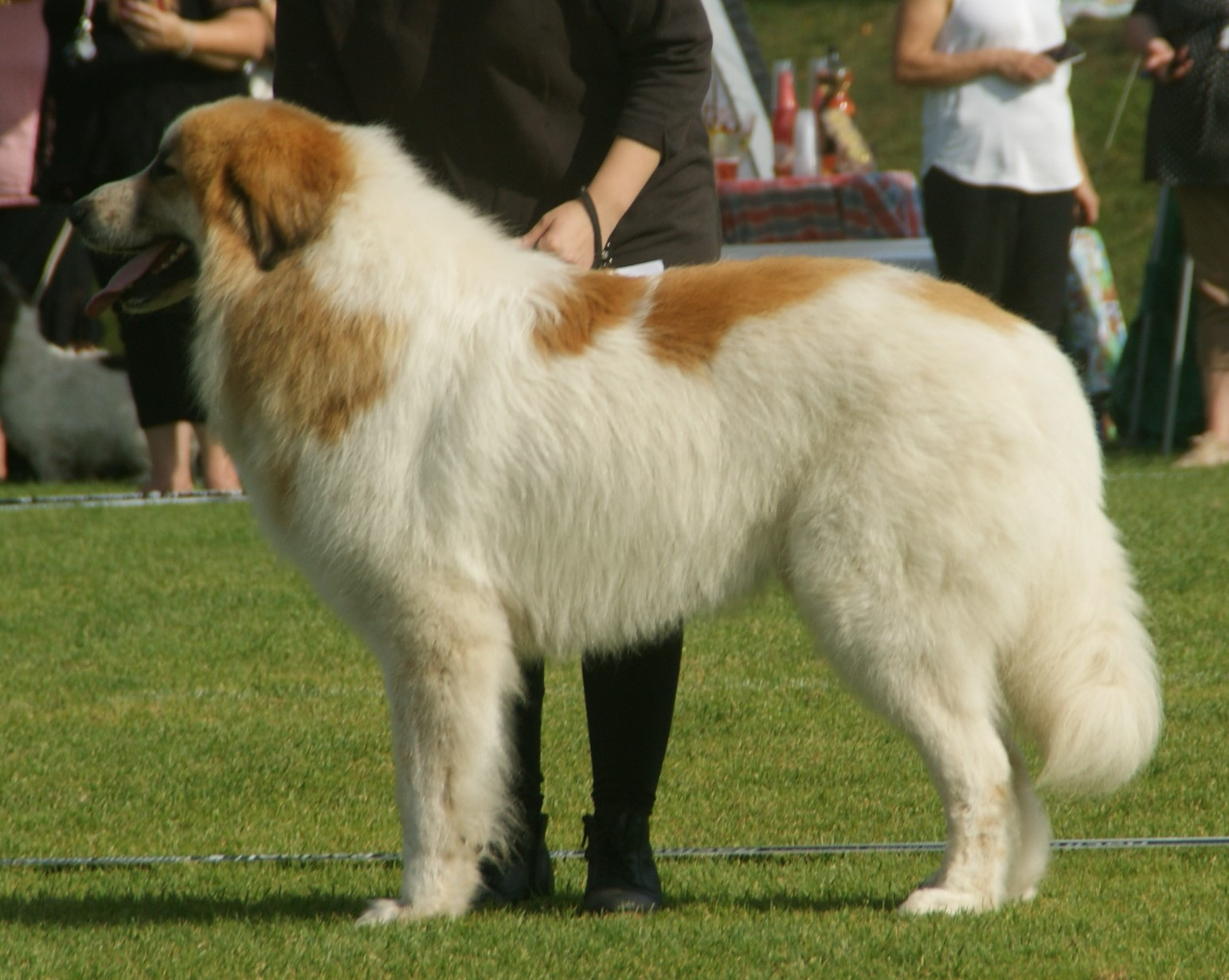
The white and badger

The Pyrenean Mountain Dog is a large, powerfully built livestock guardian. According to the breed standard of the Société Centrale Canine, dogs stand 70 to 80 cm (28 to 31 in) at the shoulder and bitches 65 to 75 cm (26 to 30 in). Healthy adults typically weigh between 55 and 75 kg (120 and 165 lb). The head is proportionate to the body, with a long, broad, slightly pointed muzzle; the lips are tight rather than pendulous, and the small triangular ears lie flat against the head. The neck is short and strong, the chest broad and moderately deep, and the tail long, carried low at rest but curling over the back when the dog is alert. A distinctive feature of the breed is the presence of double dewclaws on the hind legs; their absence is considered a disqualifying fault in showing.

The breed's double coat is long and thick, providing insulation and protection in harsh mountain weather. The outer coat is flat and particularly long around the neck, tail, and backs of the legs, while the undercoat is fine and dense. Pyrenean Mountain Dogs are predominantly white, sometimes with patches of black, badger, grey, or various shades of tan, most commonly on the head. Badger refers to a mixture of brown, black, grey and white hairs; it is frequently seen in puppies but often fades as they mature. Purebred dogs with black patches do occur, but this colouration is considered a disqualifying fault in the show ring.

A 2024 UK study reported a median lifespan of 10.9 years for the breed, below the overall canine average of 12.5 years. A 2005 Swedish insurance study found that 58% of Pyrenean Mountain Dogs died by age 10, compared with 35% across all breeds.

== Use ==
=== Pastoral uses ===
For millennia, these dogs were used by shepherds throughout the Pyrenean region to protect their flocks from predation by wolves and bears; in this role they were usually fitted with a heavy iron wolf collar studded with long nails for protection when fighting off wolves. They were often used by shepherds in combination with the much smaller Pyrenean Sheepdog, the former guarding the flocks and the latter herding them. The Pyrenean Mountain Dog is used in its original role as a livestock guardian by shepherds in the French Pyrenees and the French Alps, as well as in the United States.

==== France ====
In the early 1980s, farmers in the Massif Central and Lozère were experiencing problems with stray dogs attacking their flocks, so the French ITOVIC (Note: l'Institut technique de l'élevage ovin et caprin or Technical Institute of Sheep and Goat Breeding.) commenced an experiment with around 15 Pyrenean Mountain Dogs given to farmers. By the late 1980s, the ITOVIC experiment had been completed and an association, APAP, (Note: Association pour la Promotion des Animaux de Protection or Association for the Promotion of Protection Animals.) had been formed with around 15 Pyrenean Mountain Dog breeders, with the objective of providing suitable livestock guardian dogs to potential farmers, and by 1991 around 100 dogs were working on farms.

In the early 1990s, Italian wolves began to cross from Italy into France, where they have become established in approximately one third of its continental territories, particularly in the French Alps and Provence, but also throughout the Massif Central. Even before the presence of wolves was publicly reported in France, some farmers around the Mercantour National Park had reported unusual stock predation, which was, at the time, attributed by authorities to uncontrolled domestic dogs. Wolves are protected in France; (Note: In France, illegally killing a wolf is punishable by two years' imprisonment and a €150,000 fine.) in order to protect the livelihoods of farmers from wolf predation, since the late 1990s the French government has subsidized various methods of protecting flocks from depredation, including electrified pasture fencing, secured electrified night pens, hiring of additional farm hands, and the purchase, training, and upkeep of livestock guardian dogs. After the extirpation of wolves from France in the 1800s, livestock guardian dogs had been absent from the French Alps for over a century; when wolves resettled the country in the 1990s, the French Pyrenean Mountain Dog was the breed selected for use, as the ITOVIC trials had already been conducted with the breed, and within the country, the APAP was breeding Pyrenean Mountain Dogs specifically for the purpose.

In the mid-1990s, the French government began importing European brown bears from Slovenia into the Pyrenees, in order to save the species from extirpation from the region by inbreeding, as the local population had been reduced to an estimated six bears. With the increased numbers of bears in the region, local shepherds reported increases of stock losses to bear predation, particularly in the summer months, when shepherds move their flocks into the mountains to graze the summer alpine pastures. To assist the shepherds, government funding was provided to implement the same protection measures as those employed for wolves, and Pyrenean Mountain Dogs were given to farmers in the Pyrenees to guard flocks from predators. Studies conducted in the mid-2000s found shepherds who employed Pyrenean Mountain Dogs across the Pyrenees reported 90% fewer stock losses to predators than shepherds who did not employ the dogs.

By 2009, over 1,000 Pyrenean Mountain Dogs were employed to protect flocks against wolves in the Alps, and 500 were protecting flocks in the Pyrenees. In 2019, French government funding was being provided for the upkeep of 4258 livestock guardian dogs throughout the country, 92% of which were in the French Alps and Provence, although it is estimated the total number of dogs being employed at the time was around 5000. The re-employment of Pyrenean Mountain Dogs within the Pyrenees has not been without issues, however, as some hikers traversing the mountains have been attacked by the livestock guardians protecting their flocks, leading to a bilingual pamphlet being produced to warn walkers and bikers against risky behaviours in order to decrease incidents.

==== United States ====
Beginning in the late 1970s, sheep farmers in the United States began employing livestock guardian dogs to protect their flocks from various predators, particularly coyotes and black bears, but also cougars and grizzly bears. Several factors influenced the move to integrate livestock guardian dogs into farming operations, including federal restrictions on the use of poisons to control predator numbers. A 1986 survey of over 400 farmers employing 763 livestock guardian dogs in the US found 57% of them used Pyrenean Mountain Dogs, with Komondors, Akbashs, Anatolians and Maremmano-Abruzzese Sheepdogs being employed in fewer numbers.

=== Non-pastoral uses ===
They came to be used by the French nobility to guard their châteaux, particularly in the south of the country. They were also used to smuggle contraband between France and Spain, carrying packs over the Pyrenees on routes impassable to humans to avoid detection by customs officials.
