= Martingale (collar) =

Type of dog collar that provides more control over the animal

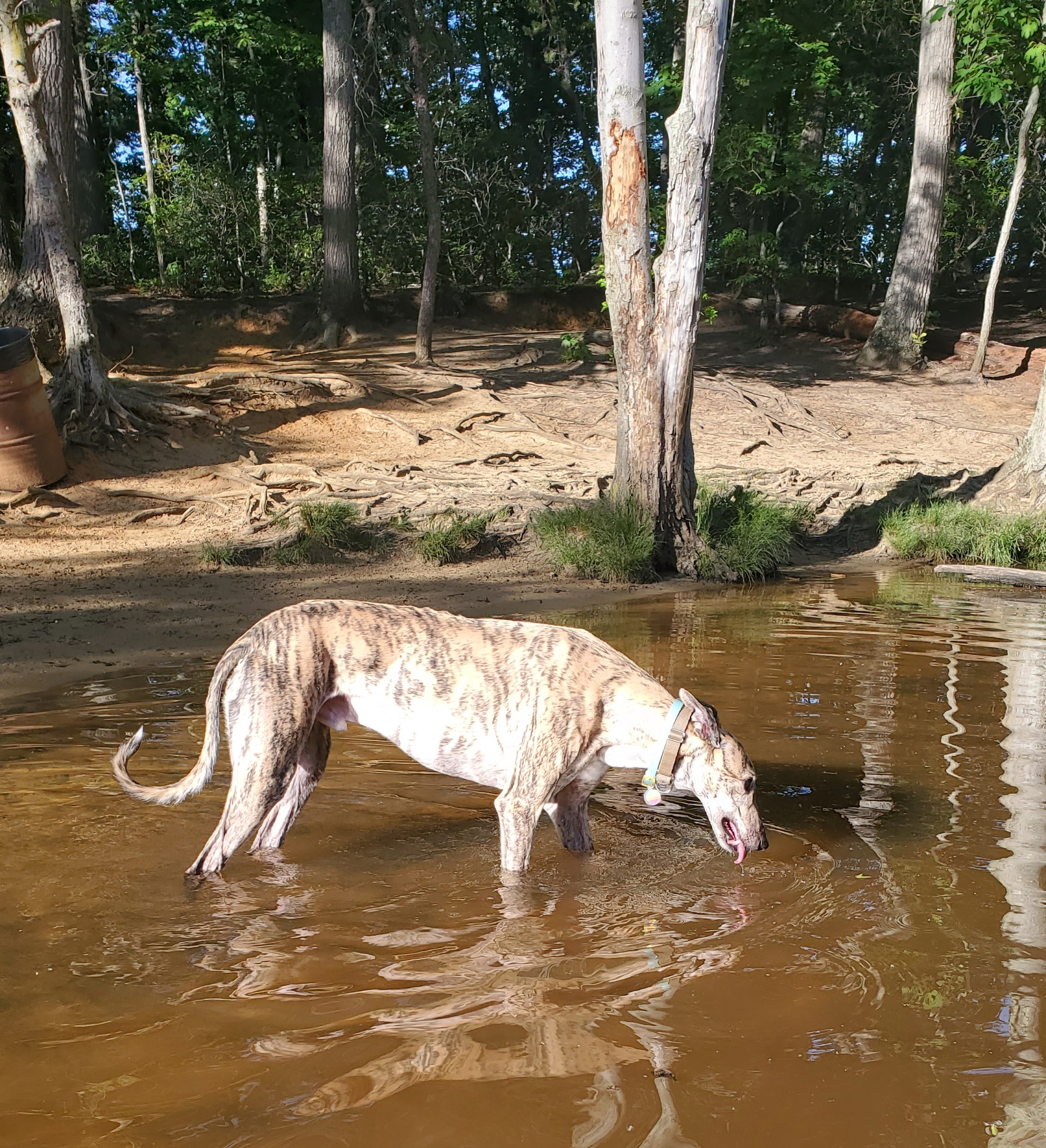
A brindle greyhound with a low-profile martingale collar

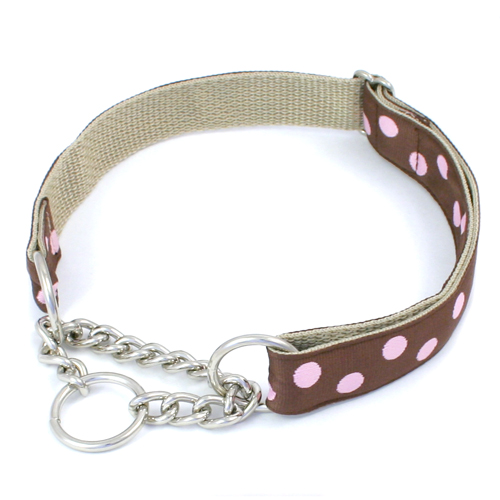
Martingale collar with chain loop; martingale collars also come with a fabric flat tab or loop instead of a chain, and optional buckles on both styles.

A martingale is a type of dog collar that provides more control over the animal without the choking effect of a slip collar.

Martingale dog collars are also known as greyhound, whippet or humane choke collars. The martingale dog collar was designed for sighthounds because their necks are larger than their heads, so they can often slip out of buckle collars. These collars have gained popularity among owners of other breeds in the recent past with many trainers now recommending them instead of choke chains or buckle collars. Martingale dog collars are particularly recommended for "escape artist" dogs that slip out of ordinary dog collars. They are also used by dog rescue groups.

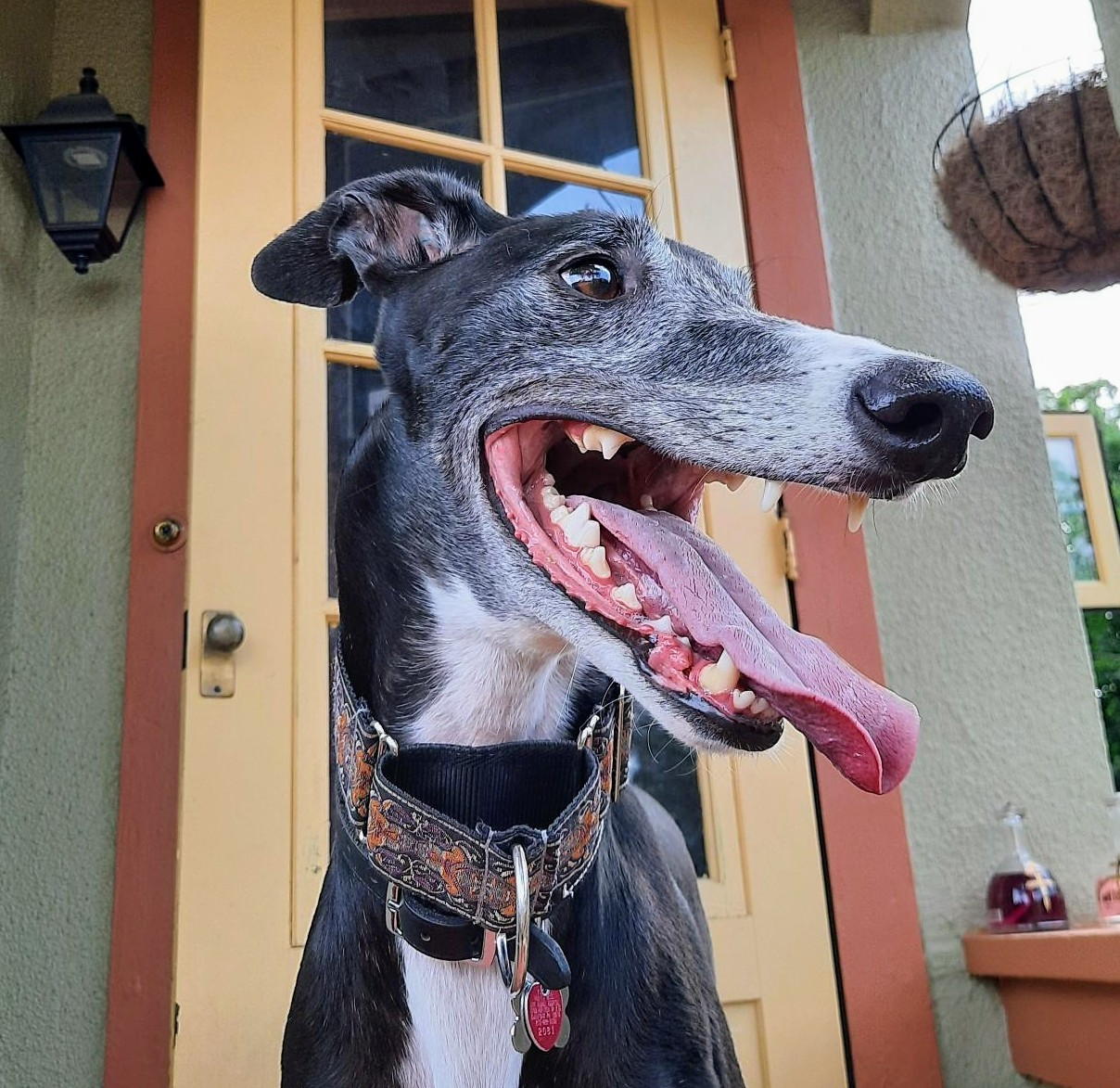
A greyhound displays a martingale collar.

A martingale collar is made with two loops. The larger loop is slipped onto the dog's neck and a lead is then clipped to the smaller loop. When the dog tries to pull, the tension on the lead pulls the small loop taut, which makes the large loop smaller and tighter on the neck, thus preventing escape. Properly fitted, the collar will be comfortably loose whenever the dog is not pulling against the leash.
