= Wolf collar =

Dog collar with outward-facing metal spikes

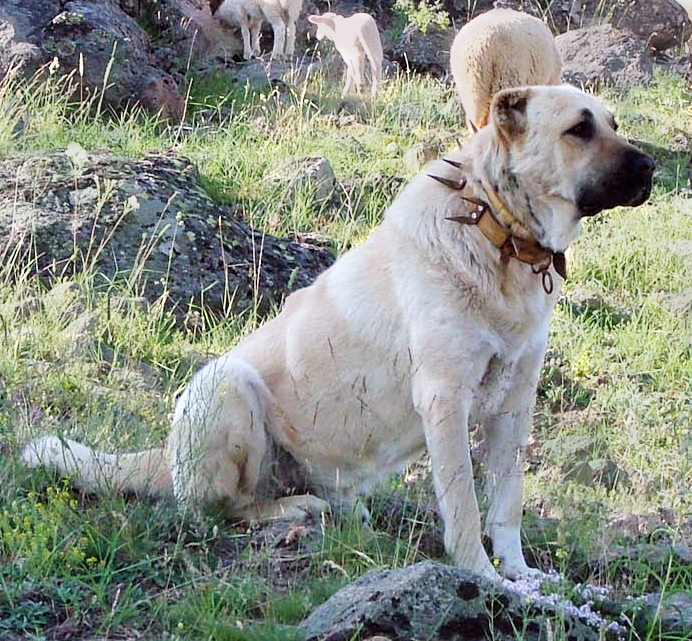
A Kangal Shepherd Dog with wolf collar

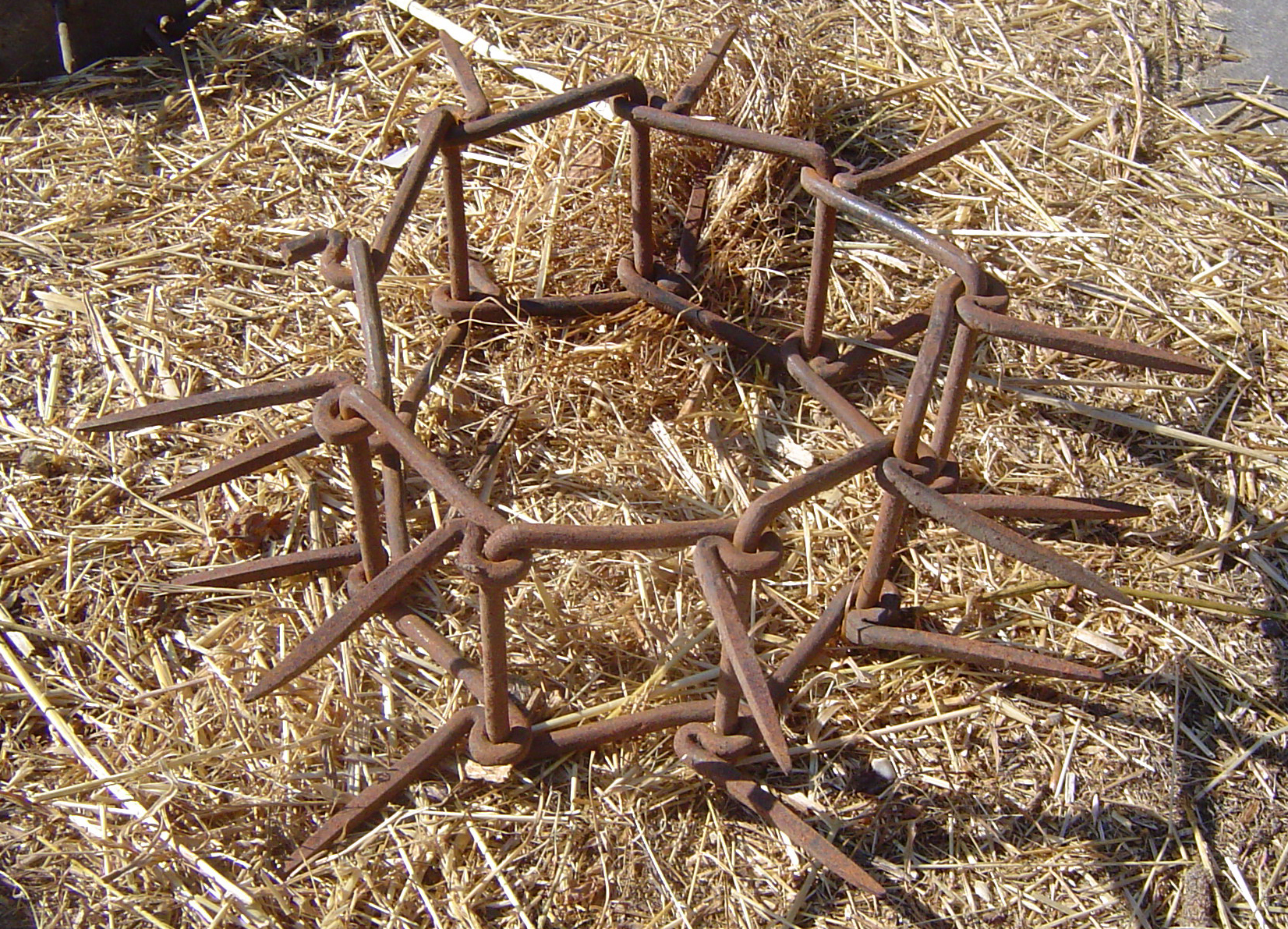
A roccale or vreccale, a spiked iron dog collar in Lazio, Italy

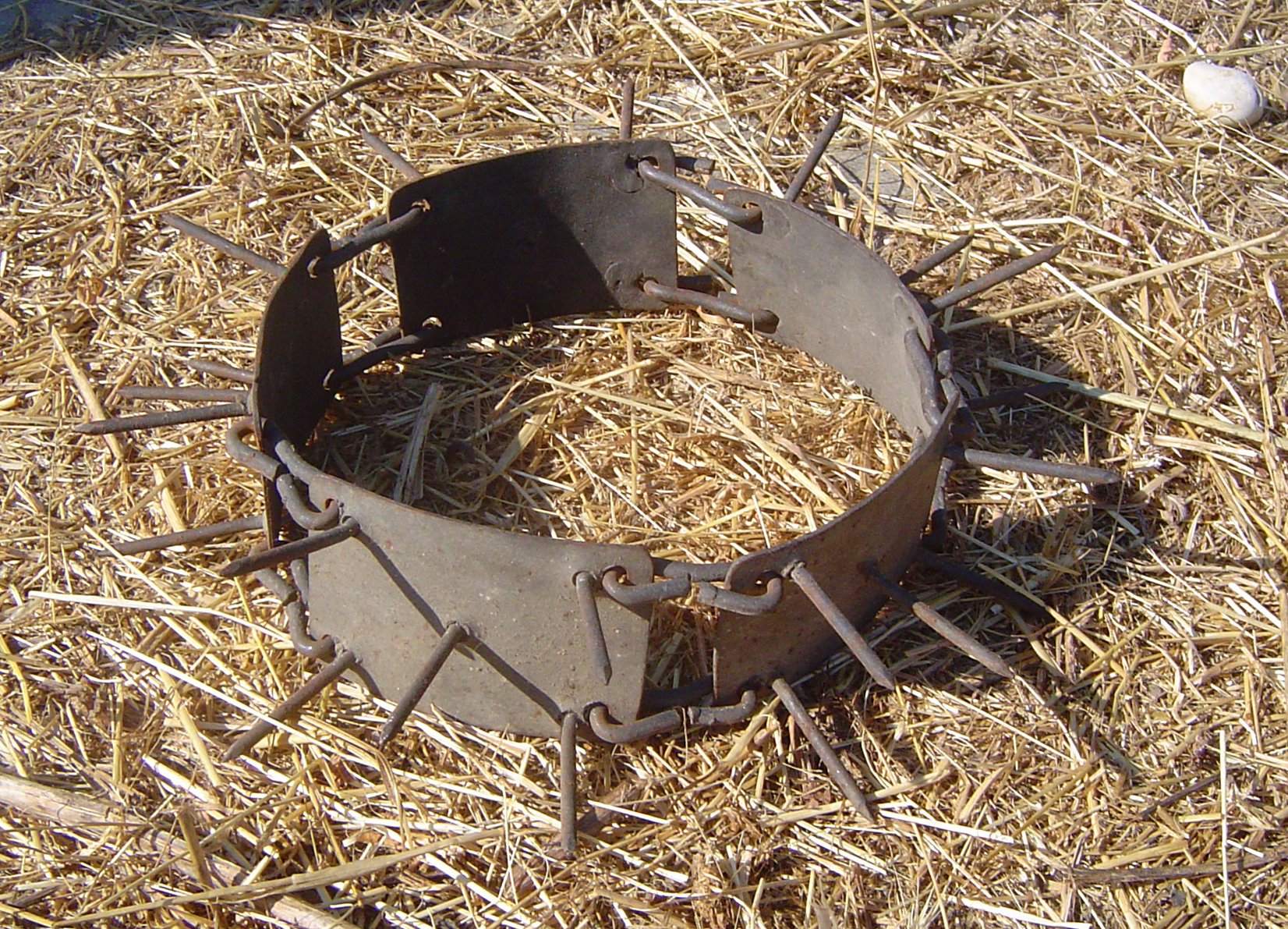
A roccale of a different type.

A wolf collar (also known as Italian: roccale or vreccale, Spanish: carlanca) is a type of dog collar designed to protect livestock guardian dogs from attacks by wolves. Wolf collars are fitted with elongated spikes to stop wolves from attacking dogs on the neck. Such collars are used by shepherds in many countries including Italy, Spain and Turkey.

Ancient Greeks used such collars to protect their dogs from wolf attacks.

In Latin the collar was called mellum or maelium or mellum or millus. Marcus Terentius Varro wrote that the farm dogs should have spiked collars for protection against wolves and other wild animals. Varro wrote that the collar was a strong leather belt around the neck, equipped with nails. Beneath the nails, a soft leather padding is sewn in to prevent the iron from harming the dog's neck.

War dogs in ancient Greece and Rome had collars with large spikes.

== Use ==
A wolf collar is normally made out of metals such as steel. The length of the spikes can be quite long, but styles differ in different places. The dogs that normally wore the collars were ones used to protect livestock from attack by wolves. The purpose of the collar is to protect the dog wearing it when it has to fight wolves. The collar base protects the dog's throat and carotid arteries, while the spikes are intended to deter bites to the neck, or even injure wolves trying to do so.
