= Crawley and Horsham Hunt =

British foxhound pack

The Crawley and Horsham Hunt is a United Kingdom foxhound pack, with hunting country of around 23 miles by 20 miles within the ceremonial county of Sussex.

== History ==
The precise date of establishment of hunting in Sussex is uncertain, but in the 17th century the Duke of Richmond formed the Old Chariton Hunt covering a huge territory later to be divided between the Goodwood Hunt and Colonel Wyndham's. The Merstham Hunt used to periodically hunt the area until these hounds were given up in 1835, whereupon the local Henry Steere turned his harriers into foxhounds, hunting the forest country north of Horsham until around 1842, when the hounds were sold to Charles Bethune and extended the hunting country out to Findon and Dial Post.

In 1851 the hounds moved to Warninglid and this pack continued until 1967 when the hounds were sold. A new hunt was then formed, with kennels at Staplefield and large improvements were seen in the hunt. The Findon country was made permanent and additional country was donated by Lord Leconfield. In November 1877 the hounds were moved to new purpose built kennels at West Grinstead, where they remain to this day.

In 2021 the Hunt Kennels at West Grinstead closed after 144 years due to loss of hunt country and financial pressures. Half the hounds were distributed to other hunts, and the rest relocated to the South Down and Eridge hunt's kennels at Ringmer, East Sussex, where the Crawley and Horsham Hunt will continue as a one day hunting a week pack.

== Pony Club ==
The hunt has an active section of The Pony Club, founded in 1932 and now with over 170 members.

== Conflict and legal actions ==
In October 2007 a 69-year-old Crawley and Horsham hunt supporter, John Hawkins was convicted at Brighton Crown Court of causing grievous bodily harm to anti-hunt protester, Lynn Phillips, by striking her with his stick and fracturing her arm. In 2008, the Crawley and Horsham hunt launched a legal action in the High Court for trespass, nuisance, and harassment against Simon and Jane Wild of West Sussex Wildlife Protection and West Sussex Badger Protection Group. The hunt used Timothy Lawson-Cruttenden, an expert in the use of the Protection from Harassment Act 1997 in such cases. This was viewed as a test case and received support from the Countryside Alliance, the Master of Foxhounds Association and 80 landowners and if successful was planned to lead to a request for an injunction against everyone associated with these groups from interfering with the hunt. The defendants claimed to have evidence of illegal hunting taking place and were asking the court to accept this as a defence to the Harassment Act action. The original judge, Justice Cranston stepped down in July 2008 due to earlier comments made in support of the ban made while an MP. During the second trial it was reported that the judge dismissed nuisance and trespass, because they had "fundamental defects", leaving only harassment. It was also reported that the protesters, using an undercover infiltrator, had been able to get hold of conclusive evidence that the claimants were engaged in illegal fox hunting. The principle plaintiff, Simon Greenwood, was filmed using his hounds to chase a fox to ground and then call in terrier-men to dig it out and throw it to the hounds The plaintiffs dropped the case in July 2009, and agreed to pay costs estimated at over £120,000.

In February 2011 the Police used pepper spray during violent clashes between 25 hunt saboteurs and members of the hunt, and then in September Andrew Leaver received a 12 months conditional discharge after being convicted of the use of "threatening words or behaviour to cause harassment or distress" to monitors of the hunt. He pleaded guilty after watching a video of him threatening protesters and attempting to punch through the side passenger window of one of their vehicles.

In May 2012 professional huntsman, Andrew Phillis, joint master, Neill Millard and the hunt secretary, Rachel Holdsworth were convicted on a total of five charges of illegally hunting. Millard and Holdsworth were fined £1000 each and both ordered to pay £2500 costs. Phillis was later sentenced to a £500 fine and £2500 costs. The prosecutions had been brought under the Hunting Act 2004.

In September 2013, professional huntsman, Nicholas Bycroft pleaded guilty to an offence under Section 1 of the Hunting Act. He admitted illegally hunting a fox during a meet at Angmering Park, near Arundel, West Sussex on 19 February 2013. He was given a 12-month conditional discharge, £150 costs and £15 victim surcharge.

In January 2014 a prosecution was dismissed against hunt terrier-man Daniel Howick and gamekeeper, Jonathan Light under the Protection of Badgers Act 1992. On the first day of trial the judge said the men could not have a fair trial because of delays in the prosecution case by police. The incident had occurred on 15 January 2013 at Balcombe during a meet of the Crawley and Horsham Hunt when it was alleged a terrier was entered into a badger sett after hounds had run a fox to ground.

On 10 October 2017, Hunt Master Kim Richardson was found guilty of a public order offence at Horsham magistrates for threatening a hunt saboteur in February 2017 during a hunt meet on the Wiston estate. He was fined £2500 with £650 prosecution costs and £130 victim surcharge.

In March 2021, Professional huntsman William Bishop was cleared of illegal fox hunting at Worthing Magistrates Court.

== See also ==
- List of foxhound packs of the United Kingdom
