= Fox hunting =

Traditional equestrian hunting activity

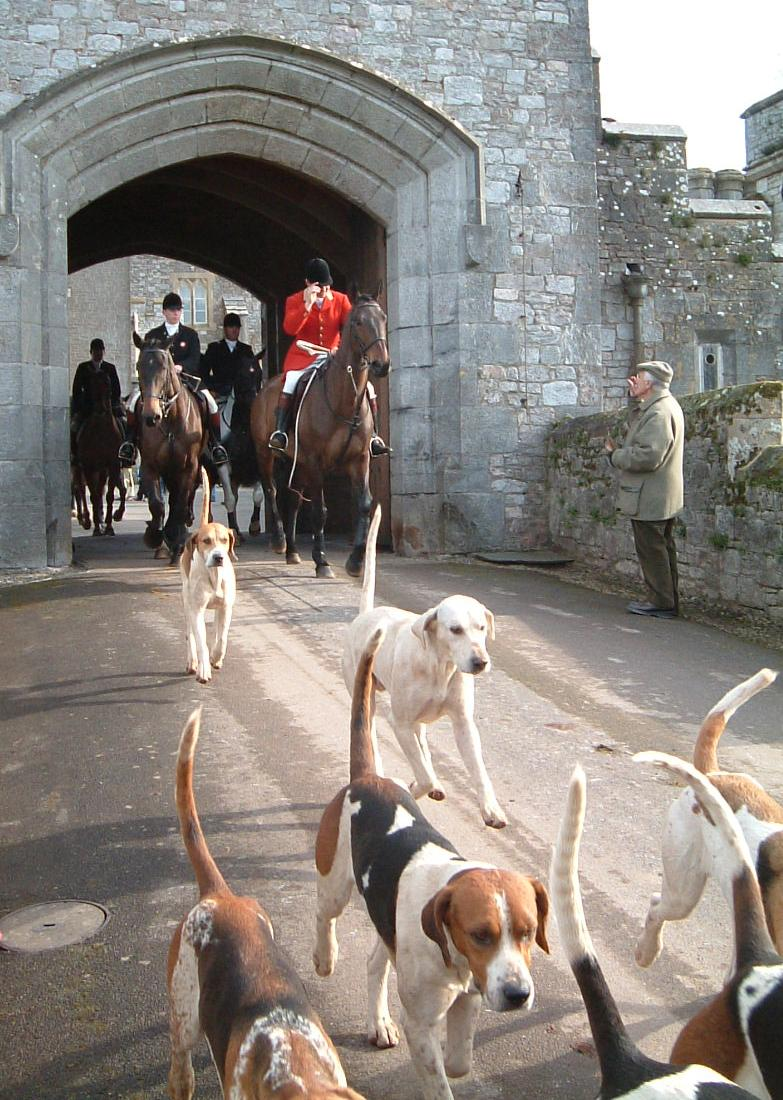
Master of foxhounds leads the field from Powderham Castle in Devon, England.

Fox hunting is a sport involving the tracking, chase and, if caught, the killing of a fox, normally a red fox, by trained foxhounds or other scent hounds. A group of unarmed followers, led by a "master of foxhounds" (or "master of hounds"), follow the hounds on foot or on horseback.

Fox hunting with hounds, as a formalised activity, originated in England in the sixteenth century, in a form very similar to that practised until February 2005, when a law banning the activity in England and Wales came into force. A ban on hunting in Scotland had been passed in 2002, but it continues to be within the law in Northern Ireland and several other jurisdictions, including Australia, Canada, France, Ireland and the United States.

The sport is controversial, particularly in the United Kingdom. Proponents of fox hunting view it as an important part of rural culture and beneficial to landscape management and a balanced ecosystem, while opponents argue it is cruel and unnecessary.

== History ==
The use of scenthounds to track prey dates back to Assyrian, Babylonian, and ancient Egyptian times, and was known as venery.

=== Europe ===
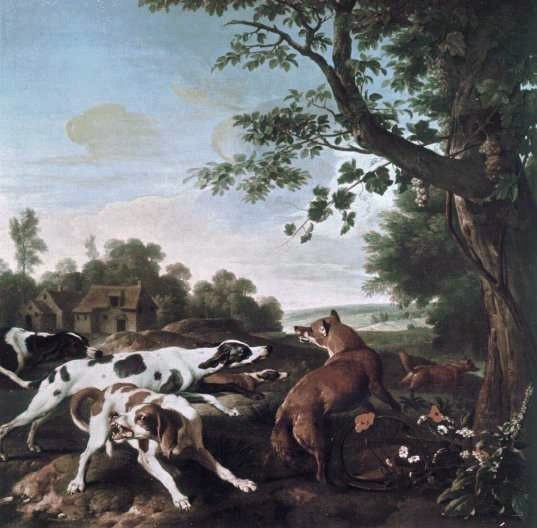
The Fox Hunt, Alexandre-François Desportes, France, 1720

Many Greek- and Roman-influenced countries have long traditions of hunting with hounds. Hunting with Agassaei hounds was popular in Celtic Britain, even before the Romans arrived, introducing the Castorian and Fulpine hound breeds which they used to hunt. Norman hunting traditions were brought to Britain when William the Conqueror arrived, along with the Gascon and Talbot hounds.

Foxes were referred to as beasts of the chase by medieval times, along with the red deer (hart & hind), martens, and roes, but the earliest known attempt to hunt a fox with hounds was in Norfolk, England, in 1534, where farmers began chasing foxes down with their dogs for the purpose of pest control. The last wolf in England was killed in the late 15th century during the reign of Henry VII, leaving the English fox with no threat from larger predators. The first use of packs specifically trained to hunt foxes was in the late 1600s, with the oldest fox hunt being, probably, the Bilsdale in Yorkshire.

By the end of the seventeenth century, deer hunting was in decline. The inclosure acts brought fences to separate formerly open land into many smaller fields, deer forests were being cut down, and arable land was increasing. With the onset of the Industrial Revolution, people began to move out of the country and into towns and cities to find work. Roads, railway lines, and canals all split hunting countries, but at the same time they made hunting accessible to more people. Shotguns were improved during the nineteenth century and the shooting of gamebirds became more popular. Fox hunting developed further in the eighteenth century when Hugo Meynell developed breeds of hound and horse to address the new geography of rural England.

In Germany, hunting with hounds (which tended to be deer or boar hunting) was first banned on the initiative of Hermann Göring on 3 July 1934. In 1939, the ban was extended to cover Austria after Germany's annexation of the country. Bernd Ergert, the director of Germany's hunting museum in Munich, said of the ban, "The aristocrats were understandably furious, but they could do nothing about the ban given the totalitarian nature of the regime."

=== United States ===
According to the Masters of Foxhounds Association of America, Englishman Robert Brooke was the first man to import hunting hounds to what is now the United States, bringing his pack of foxhounds to Maryland in 1650, along with his horses. Also around this time, numbers of European red foxes were introduced into the Eastern seaboard of North America for hunting. The first organised hunt for the benefit of a group (rather than a single patron) was started by Thomas, sixth Lord Fairfax in 1747. In the United States, George Washington and Thomas Jefferson both kept packs of foxhounds before and after the American Revolutionary War.

=== Australia ===
In Australia, the European red fox was introduced solely for the purpose of fox hunting in 1855. Native animal populations have been very badly affected, with the extinction of at least 10 species attributed to the spread of foxes. Fox hunting with hounds is mainly practised in the east of Australia. In the state of Victoria there are thirteen hunts, with more than 1000 members between them. Fox hunting with hounds results in around 650 foxes being killed annually in Victoria, compared with over 90,000 shot over a similar period in response to a State government bounty. The Adelaide Hunt Club traces its origins to 1840, just a few years after the colonization of South Australia.

== Current status ==
=== United Kingdom ===
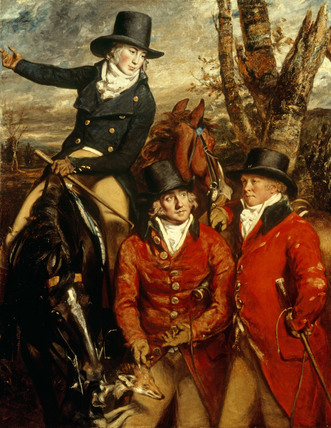
The Rev. William Heathcote (1772–1802), on horseback (son of the 3rd Baronet); Sir William Heathcote of Hursley, 3rd Baronet (1746–1819), holding his horse and whip; and Major Vincent Hawkins Gilbert, M.F.H., holding a fox's head. The Heathcote's family seat was Hursley House. Daniel Gardner portrayed the three gentlemen on the hunt in 1790.

Fox hunting is prohibited in Great Britain by the Protection of Wild Mammals (Scotland) Act 2002 and the Hunting Act 2004 (England and Wales), passed under the ministry of Tony Blair, but remains legal in Northern Ireland. The passing of the Hunting Act was notable in that it was implemented through the use of the Parliament Acts 1911 and 1949, after the House of Lords refused to pass the legislation, despite the Commons passing it by a majority of 356 to 166.

After the ban on fox hunting, hunts in Great Britain switched to legal alternatives, such as drag hunting and trail hunting. The Hunting Act 2004 also permits some previously unusual forms of hunting wild mammals with dogs to continue, such as "hunting... for the purpose of enabling a bird of prey to hunt the wild mammal".

Opponents of hunting, such as the League Against Cruel Sports, say that some of these alternatives are a smokescreen for illegal hunting or a means of circumventing the ban. Hunting support group the Countryside Alliance said in 2006 that there was anecdotal evidence that the number of foxes killed by hunts (unintentionally) and farmers had increased since the Hunting Act came into force, both by the hunts (through lawful methods) and landowners, and that more people were hunting with hounds (although killing foxes had become illegal).

Blair wrote in his 2010 memoir that the Hunting Act was "one of the domestic legislative measures I most regret".

The Labour Party's 2024 general election manifesto includes a pledge to ban trail hunting. Following their election, it was announced that the ban would feature in its new animal welfare strategy, with consultations to begin in early 2026 as to how to deliver an effective ban.

=== United States ===
In America, fox hunting is also called "fox chasing", as it is the practice of many hunts not to actually kill the fox (the red fox is not regarded as a significant pest). Some hunts may go without catching a fox for several seasons, despite chasing two or more foxes in a single day's hunting. Foxes are not pursued once they have "gone to ground" (hidden in a hole). American fox hunters undertake stewardship of the land, and endeavour to maintain fox populations and habitats as much as possible. In many areas of the eastern United States the coyote, a natural predator of the red and grey fox, is becoming more prevalent and threatens fox populations in a hunt's given territory. In some areas, coyote are considered fair game when hunting with foxhounds, even if they are not the intended species being hunted.

In 2013, the Masters of Foxhounds Association of North America listed 163 registered packs in the US and Canada. This number does not include non-registered (also known as "farmer" or "outlaw") packs. Baily's Hunting Directory Lists 163 foxhound or draghound packs in the US and 11 in Canada In some arid parts of the Western United States, where foxes in general are more difficult to locate, coyotes are hunted and, in some cases, bobcats.

=== Other countries ===
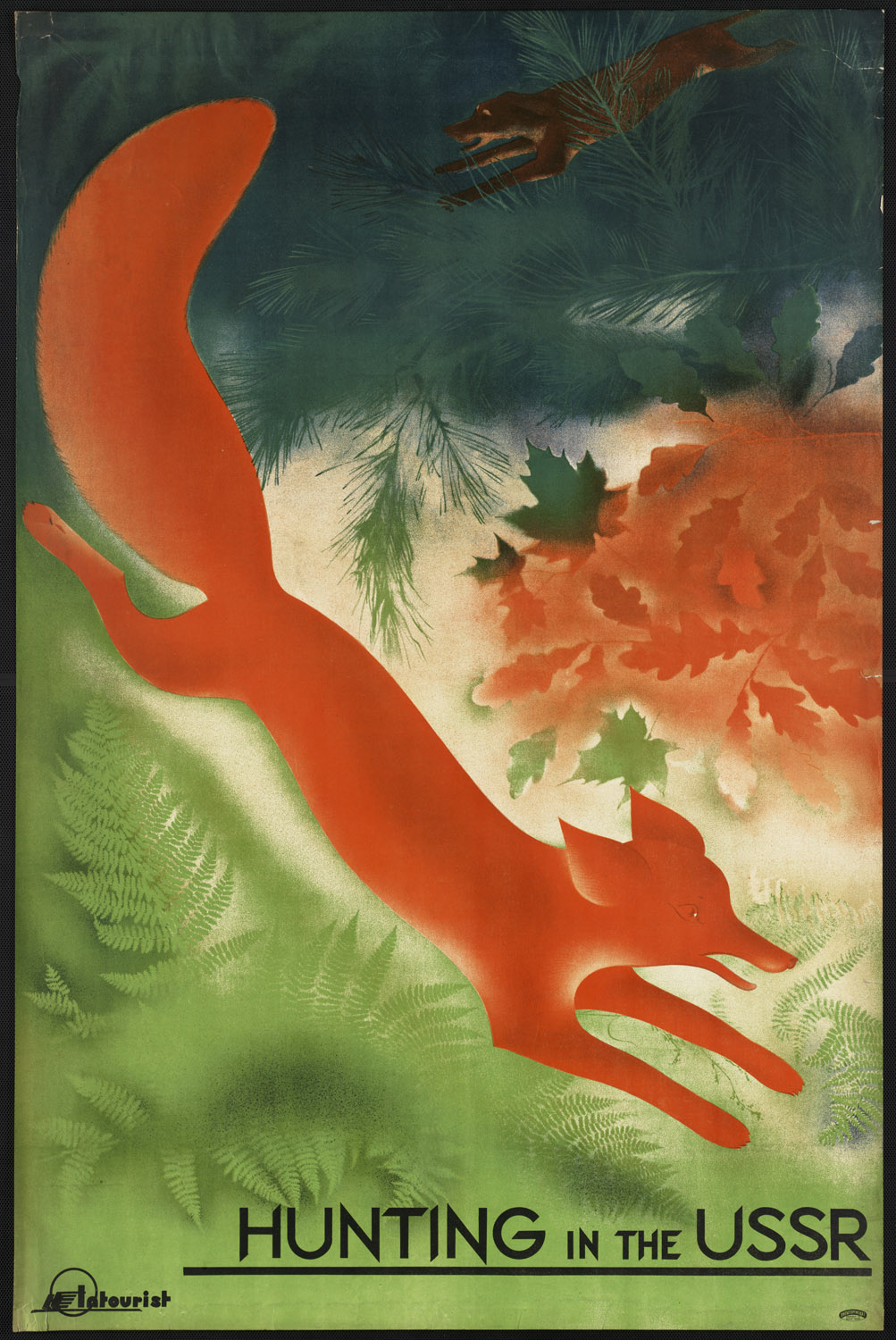
Lithograph. Tourism travel poster issued 1922–1959 (approximate)

The other main countries in which organized fox hunting with hounds is practised are Ireland (which has 42 registered packs), Australia, France (this hunting practice is also used for other animals such as deer, wild boar, fox, hare or rabbit), Canada and Italy. There is one pack of foxhounds in Portugal, and one in India. Although there are 32 packs for the hunting of foxes in France, hunting tends to take place mainly on a small scale and on foot, with mounted hunts tending to hunt red or roe deer, or wild boar.

In Portugal fox hunting is permitted (Decree-Law no. 202/2004) but there have been popular protests and initiatives to abolish it. A petition was handed over to the Assembly of the Republic on 18 May 2017 and the parliamentary hearing held in 2018.

In Canada, the Masters of Foxhounds Association of North America lists seven registered hunt clubs in the province of Ontario, one in Quebec, and one in Nova Scotia. Ontario issues licenses to registered hunt clubs, authorizing its members to pursue, chase or search for fox, although the primary target of the hunts is coyotes.

== Quarry animals ==
=== Red fox ===
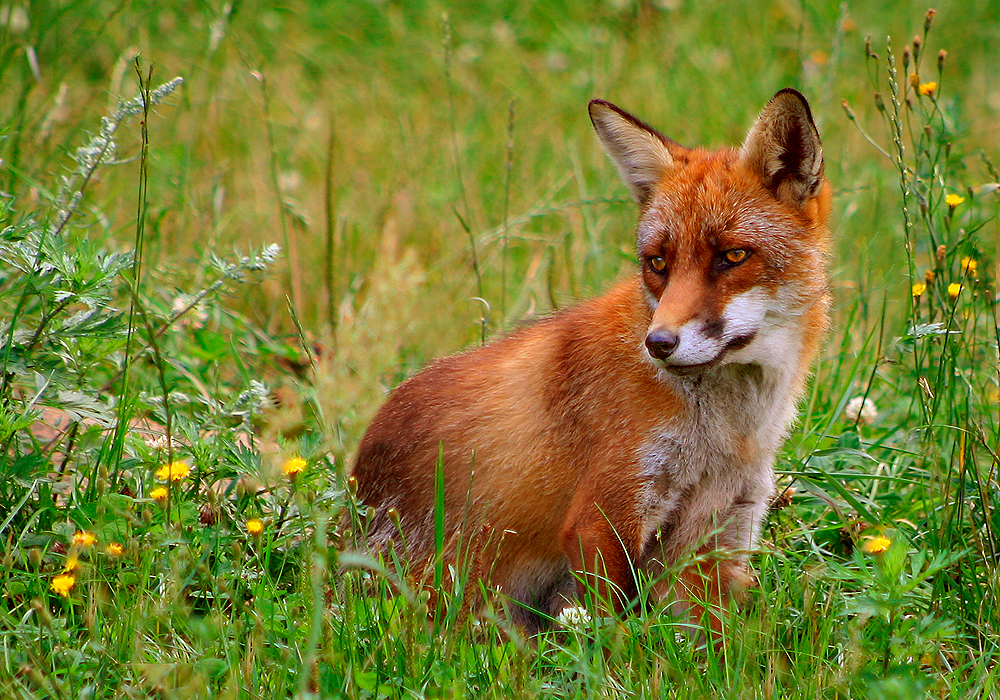
The red fox is the main quarry of European and North American fox hunts.

The red fox (Vulpes vulpes) is the normal prey animal of a fox hunt in the US and Europe. A small omnivorous predator, the fox lives in burrows called earths, and is predominantly active around twilight (making it a crepuscular animal). Adult foxes tend to range around an area of between 5 and 15 km^{2} (2 and 6 square miles) in good terrain, although in poor terrain, their range can be as much as 20 km^{2} (7 3/4 square miles). The red fox can run at up to 48 km/h (30 mph). The fox is also variously known as a Tod (old English word for fox), Reynard (the name of an anthropomorphic character in European literature from the twelfth century), or Charlie (named for the Whig politician Charles James Fox). American red foxes tend to be larger than European forms, but according to foxhunters' accounts, they have less cunning, vigour and endurance in the chase than European foxes.

=== Coyote, grey fox, and other quarry ===
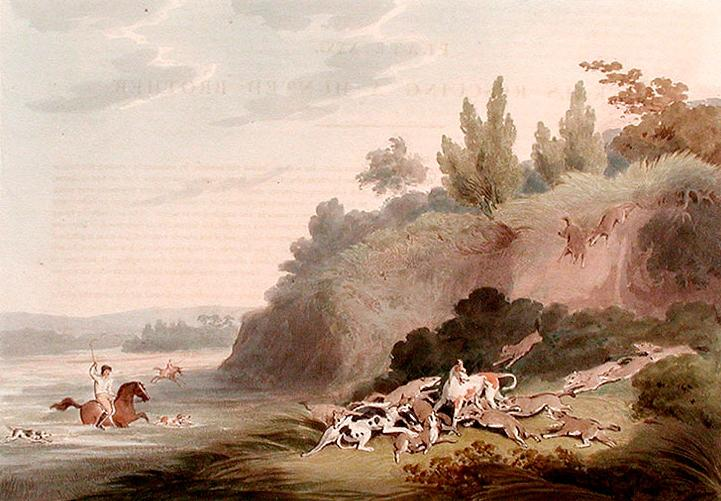
Hunting Jackals by Samuel Howitt, illustrating a group of golden jackals rushing to the defence of a fallen pack-mate

Other species than the red fox may be the quarry for hounds in some areas. The choice of quarry depends on the region and numbers available. The coyote (Canis latrans) is a significant quarry for many Hunts in North America, particularly in the west and southwest, where there are large open spaces. The coyote is an indigenous predator that did not range east of the Mississippi River until the latter half of the twentieth century. The coyote is faster than a fox, running at 65 km/h (40 mph) and also wider ranging, with a territory of up to 283 km^{2} (109 square miles), so a much larger hunt territory is required to chase it. However, coyotes tend to be less challenging intellectually, as they offer a straight line hunt instead of the convoluted fox line. Coyotes can be challenging opponents for the dogs in physical confrontations, despite the size advantage of a large dog. Coyotes have larger canine teeth and are generally more practised in hostile encounters.

The grey fox (Urocyon cinereoargenteus), a distant relative of the European red fox, is also hunted in North America. It is an adept climber of trees, making it harder to hunt with hounds. The scent of the gray fox is not as strong as that of the red, therefore more time is needed for the hounds to take the scent. Unlike the red fox which, during the chase, will run far ahead from the pack, the gray fox will speed toward heavy brush, thus making it more difficult to pursue. Also unlike the red fox, which occurs more prominently in the northern United States, the more southern gray fox is rarely hunted on horseback, due to its densely covered habitat preferences.

Hunts in the southern United States sometimes pursue the bobcat (Lynx rufus). In countries such as India, and in other areas formerly under British influence, such as Iraq, the golden jackal (Canis aureus) is often the quarry. During the British Raj, British sportsmen in India would hunt jackals on horseback with hounds as a substitute for the fox hunting of their native England. Unlike foxes, golden jackals were documented to be ferociously protective of their pack mates, and could seriously injure hounds. Jackals were not hunted often in this manner, as they were slower than foxes and could scarcely outrun greyhounds after 200 yards or 180 m.

== Alternatives to hunting live prey ==
Following the ban on fox hunting in Great Britain, hunts switched to legal alternatives in order to preserve their traditional practices, although some hunt supporters had previously claimed this would be impossible and that hound packs would have to be destroyed.

Most hunts turned, primarily, to trail hunting, which anti-hunt organisations claim is just a smokescreen for illegal hunting. Some anti-hunting campaigners have urged hunts to switch to the established sport of drag hunting instead, as this involves significantly less risk of wild animals being accidentally caught and killed.

=== Trail hunting ===
A controversial alternative to hunting animals with hounds. A trail of animal urine (most commonly fox) is laid in advance of the 'hunt', and then tracked by the hound pack and a group of followers; on foot, horseback, or both. Because the trail is laid using animal urine, and in areas where such animals naturally occur, hounds often pick up the scent of live animals; sometimes resulting in them being caught and killed.

=== Drag hunting ===
An established sport which dates back to the 19th century. Hounds follow an artificial scent, usually aniseed, laid along a set route which is already known to the huntsmen. A drag hunt course is set in a similar manner to a cross country course, following a route over jumps and obstacles. Because it is predetermined, the route can be tailored to keep hounds away from sensitive areas known to be populated by animals which could be confused for prey.

=== Hound trailing ===
Similar to drag hunting, but in the form of a race; usually of around 15 km (10 miles) in length. Unlike other forms of hunting, the hounds are not followed by humans.

=== Clean boot hunting ===
Clean boot hunting uses packs of bloodhounds to follow the natural trail of a human's scent.

== Animals of the hunt ==
=== Hounds and other dogs ===
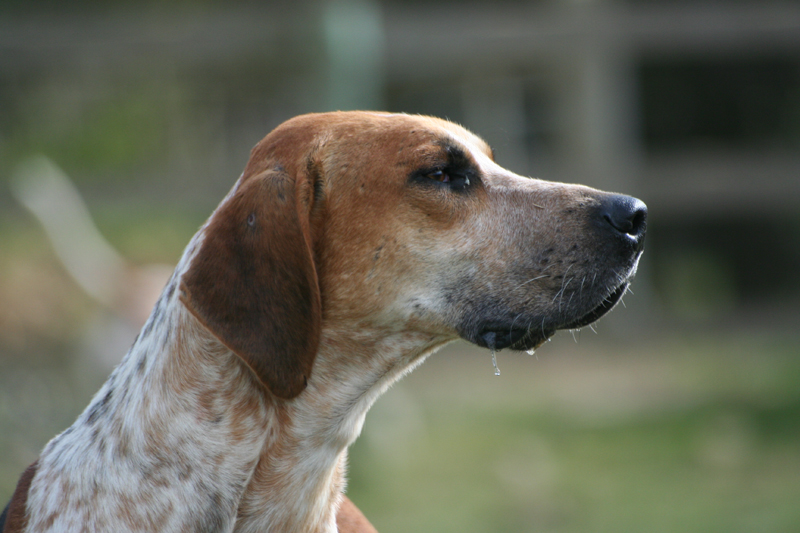
An English Foxhound

Fox hunting is usually undertaken with a pack of scent hounds, and, in most cases, these are specially bred foxhounds. These dogs are trained to pursue the fox based on its scent. The two main types of foxhound are the English Foxhound and the American Foxhound. It is possible to use a sight hound such as a Greyhound or lurcher to pursue foxes, though this practice is not common in organised hunting, and these dogs are more often used for coursing animals such as hares. There is also one pack of beagles in Virginia that hunt foxes. They are unique in that they are the only hunting beagle pack in the US to be followed on horseback. English Foxhounds are also used for hunting mink.

Hunts may also use terriers to flush or kill foxes that are hiding underground, as they are small enough to pursue the fox through narrow earth passages. This is not practised in the United States, as once the fox has gone to ground and is accounted for by the hounds, it is left alone.

=== Horses ===
A mixed field of horses at a hunt, including children on ponies

The horses, called "field hunters" or hunters, ridden by members of the field, are a prominent feature of many hunts, although others are conducted on foot (and those hunts with a field of mounted riders will also have foot followers). Horses on hunts can range from specially bred and trained field hunters to casual hunt attendees riding a wide variety of horse and pony types. Draft and Thoroughbred crosses are commonly used as hunters, although purebred Thoroughbreds and horses of many different breeds are also used.

Some hunts with unique territories favour certain traits in field hunters; for example, when hunting coyote in the western US, a faster horse with more stamina is required to keep up, as coyotes are faster than foxes and inhabit larger territories. Hunters must be well-mannered, have the athletic ability to clear large obstacles such as wide ditches, tall fences, and rock walls, and have the stamina to keep up with the hounds. In English foxhunting, the horses are often a cross of half or a quarter Irish Draught and the remainder English thoroughbred.

Dependent on terrain, and to accommodate different levels of ability, hunts generally have alternative routes that do not involve jumping. The field may be divided into two groups, with one group, the First Field, that takes a more direct but demanding route that involves jumps over obstacles while another group, the Second Field (also called Hilltoppers or Gaters), takes longer but less challenging routes that utilise gates or other types of access on the flat.

=== Birds of prey ===
In Great Britain, since the introduction of the hunting ban, a number of hunts have employed falconers to bring birds of prey to the hunt, due to the exemption in the Hunting Act for falconry. Many experts, such as the Hawk Board, deny that any bird of prey can reasonably be used in the British countryside to kill a fox which has been flushed by (and is being chased by) a pack of hounds.

== Procedure ==
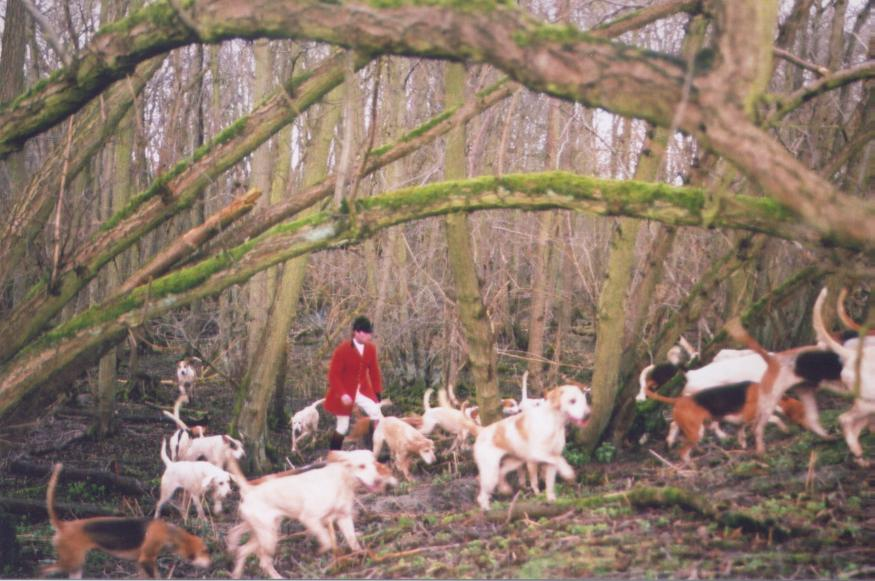
The Bedale Hunt, Yorkshire, drawing a wood in February 2005

=== Main hunting season ===
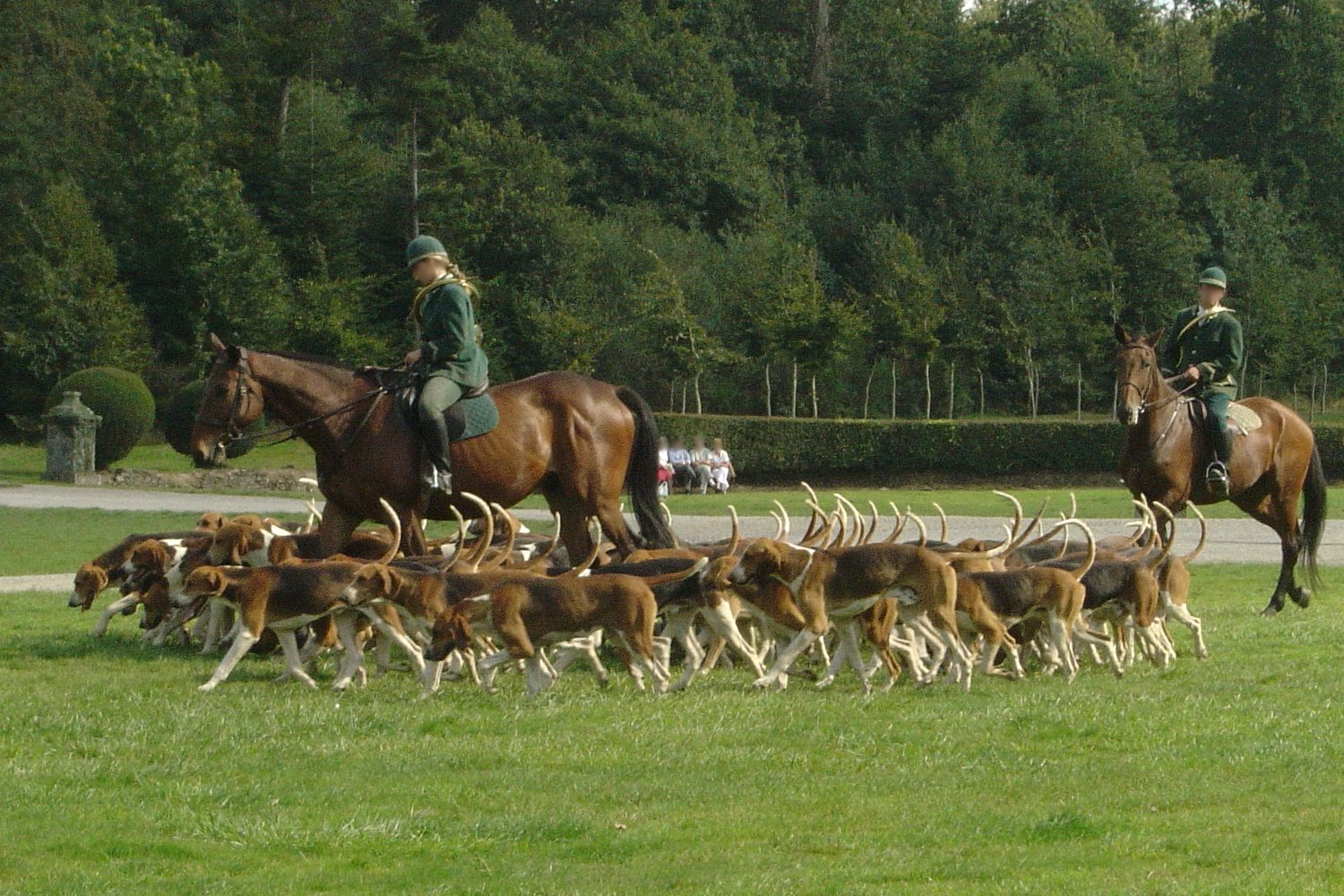
A French staghound pack: moving off

The main hunting season usually begins in early November, in the northern hemisphere, and in May in the southern hemisphere.

A hunt begins when the hounds are put, or cast, into a patch of woods or brush where foxes are known to lay up during daylight hours; known as a covert (pronounced "cover"). If the pack manages to pick up the scent of a fox, they will track it for as long as they are able. Scenting can be affected by temperature, humidity, and other factors. If the hounds lose the scent, a check occurs.

The hounds pursue the trail of the fox and the riders follow, by the most direct route possible. This may involve very athletic skill on the part of horse and rider, and fox hunting has given birth to some traditional equestrian sports including steeplechase and point-to-point racing.

The hunt continues until either the fox goes to ground (evades the hounds and takes refuge in a burrow or den) or is overtaken and usually killed by the hounds.

Social rituals are important to hunts, although many have fallen into disuse. One of the most notable was the act of blooding. In this ceremony, the master or huntsman would smear the blood of the fox onto the cheeks or forehead of a newly initiated hunt-follower, often a young child. Another practice of some hunts was to cut off the fox's tail (brush), the feet (pads) and the head (mask) as trophies, with the carcass then thrown to the hounds. Both of these practices were widely abandoned during the nineteenth century, although isolated cases may still have occurred to the modern day.

== Cubbing ==
In the autumn of each year, hunts accustom the young hounds, which by now are full-size, but not yet sexually mature, to hunt and kill foxes through the practice of cubbing (also called cub hunting, autumn hunting and entering). Cubbing also aims to teach hounds to restrict their hunting to foxes, so that they do not hunt other species such as deer or hares.

The activity sometimes incorporates the practice of holding up; where hunt supporters, riders and foot followers surround a covert and drive back foxes attempting to escape, before then drawing the covert with the young hounds and some more experienced hounds, allowing them to find and kill foxes within the surrounded covert. A young hound is considered to be entered into the pack once they have successfully joined in a hunt of this fashion. Young hounds which do not show sufficient aptitude may be killed by their owners or drafted to other packs, including minkhound packs.

Cub hunting is now illegal in Great Britain, although anti-hunt associations maintain that the practice continues.

== People ==
=== Hunt staff and officials ===
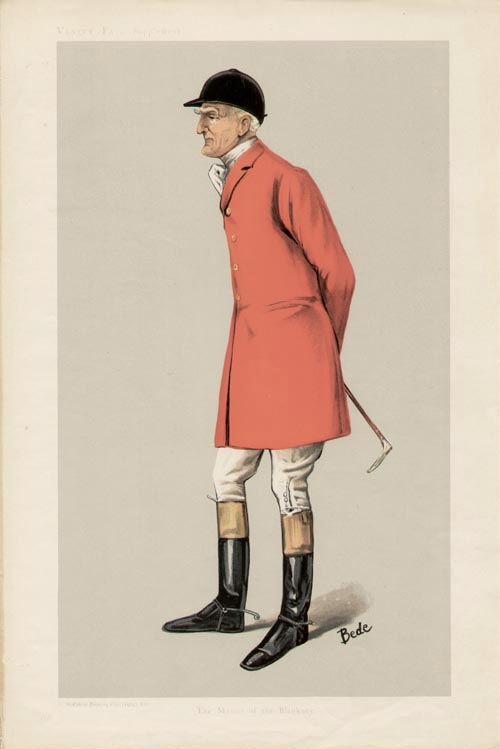
Caricature of Edgar Lubbock (1847–1907): "The Master of the Blankney". Published in Vanity Fair (1906)

As a social ritual, participants in a fox hunt fill specific roles, the most prominent of which is the master, who often number more than one and then are called masters or joint masters. These individuals typically take much of the financial responsibility for the overall management of the sporting activities of the hunt, along with the care and breeding of the hunt's foxhounds as well as control and direction of its paid staff.

- The Master of Foxhounds (who uses the post-nominal (and may also be called) MFH) or Joint Master of Foxhounds operates the sporting activities of the hunt, maintains the kennels, works with (and sometimes is) the huntsman, and spends the money raised by the hunt club. (Often the master or joint masters are the largest of financial contributors to the hunt.) The master will have the final say over all matters in the field.
- Honorary secretaries are volunteers (usually one or two) who look after the administration of the hunt.
- The Treasurer collects the cap (money) from guest riders and manages the hunt's finances.
- A kennelman looks after hounds in kennels, assuring that all tasks are completed when pack and staff return from hunting.
- The huntsman, who may be a professional, is responsible for directing the hounds. The Huntsman usually carries a horn to communicate to the hounds, followers and whippers in. Some huntsmen also fill the role of kennelman (and are therefore known as the kennel huntsman). In some hunts the master is also the huntsman.
- Whippers-in (or "Whips") are assistants to the huntsman. Their main job is to keep the pack all together, especially to prevent the hounds from straying or 'riotting', which term refers to the hunting of animals other than the hunted fox or trail line. To help them to control the pack, they carry hunting whips (and in the United States they sometimes also carry .22 revolvers loaded with snake shot or blanks.) The role of whipper-in in hunts has inspired parliamentary systems (including the Westminster System and the US Congress) to use whip for a member who enforces party discipline and ensures the attendance of other members at important votes.
- Terrier man – Carries out fox control. Most hunts where the object is to kill the fox will employ a terrier man, whose job it is to control the terriers, which may be used underground to corner or flush the fox. Often voluntary terrier men will follow the hunt as well. In the UK and Ireland, they often ride quadbikes with their terriers in boxes on their bikes.

In addition to members of the hunt staff, a committee may run the Hunt Supporters Club to organise fundraising and social events and in the United States many hunts are incorporated and have parallel lines of leadership.

The United Kingdom, Ireland, and the United States each have a Masters of Foxhounds Association (MFHA), which consists of current and past masters of foxhounds. This is the governing body for all foxhound packs and deals with disputes about boundaries between hunts, as well as regulating the activity.

=== Attire ===
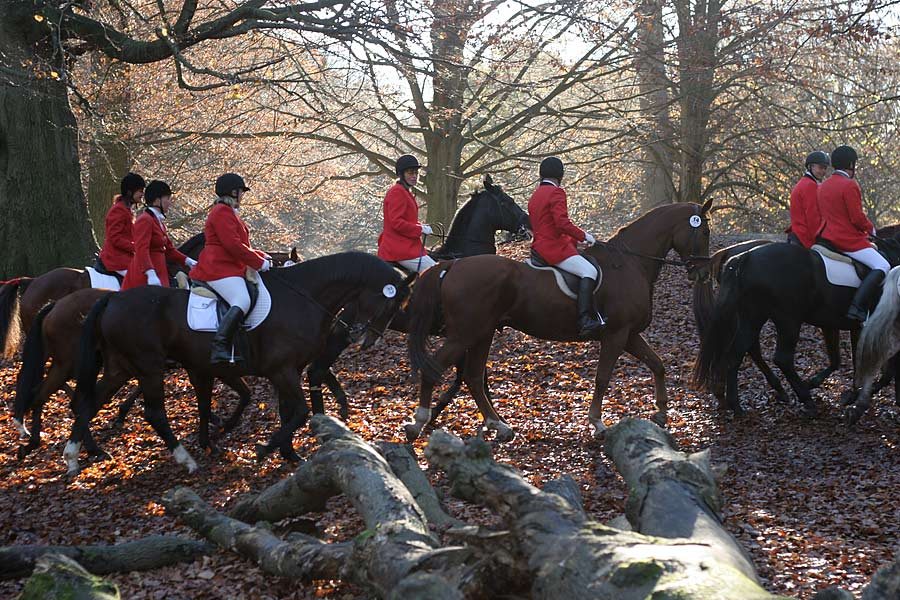
Members of the field following a Danish drag hunt

Mounted hunt followers typically wear traditional hunting attire. A prominent feature of hunts operating during the formal hunt season (usually November to March in the northern hemisphere) is hunt members wearing 'colours'. This attire usually consists of the traditional red coats worn by huntsmen, masters, former masters, whippers-in (regardless of sex), other hunt staff members and male members who have been invited by masters to wear colours and hunt buttons as a mark of appreciation for their involvement in the organization and running of the hunt.

Since the Hunting Act in England and Wales, only Masters and Hunt Servants tend to wear red coats or the hunt livery whilst out hunting. Gentleman subscribers tend to wear black coats, with or without hunt buttons. In some countries, women generally wear coloured collars on their black or navy coats. These help them stand out from the rest of the field.

Red fox hunting coat with 4 gold buttons and square skirt, as worn in England by Masters of Foxhounds and hunt staff. Masters who serve as their own huntsman ("hunt their own hounds"), known as "Amateur Masters", and professional huntsmen, wear five buttons with square corners on the skirt. Members of the field who have been "awarded colours" (permitted to wear a red coat and hunt buttons) wear three buttons (and in old tradition with rounded corners on the coat skirt).

The traditional red coats are often misleadingly called "pinks". Various theories about the derivation of this term have been given, ranging from the colour of a weathered scarlet coat to the name of a purportedly famous tailor.

Some hunts, including most harrier and beagle packs, wear green rather than red jackets, and some hunts wear other colours such as mustard. The colour of breeches vary from hunt to hunt and are generally of one colour, though two or three colours throughout the year may be permitted. Riding boots are generally English dress boots (no laces). For the men they are black with brown leather tops (called tan tops), and for the women, black with a patent black leather top of similar proportion to the men. Additionally, the number of buttons is significant. The Master wears a scarlet coat with four brass buttons while the huntsman and other professional staff wear five. Amateur whippers-in also wear four buttons.

Another differentiation in dress between the amateur and professional staff is found in the ribbons at the back of the hunt cap. The professional staff wear their hat ribbons down, while amateur staff and members of the field wear their ribbons up.

Those members not entitled to wear colours, dress in a black hunt coat and unadorned black buttons for both men and women, generally with pale breeches. Boots are all English dress boots and have no other distinctive look. Some hunts also further restrict the wear of formal attire to weekends and holidays and wear ratcatcher (tweed jacket and tan breeches), at all other times.

Other members of the mounted field follow strict rules of clothing etiquette. For example, for some hunts, those under eighteen (or sixteen in some cases) will wear ratcatcher all season. Those over eighteen (or in the case of some hunts, all followers regardless of age) will wear ratcatcher during autumn hunting from late August until the Opening Meet, normally around 1 November. From the Opening Meet they will switch to formal hunting attire where entitled members will wear scarlet and the rest black or navy.

The highest honour is to be awarded the hunt button by the Hunt Master. This sometimes means one can then wear scarlet if male, or the hunt collar if female (colour varies from hunt to hunt) and buttons with the hunt crest on them. For non-mounted packs or non-mounted members where formal hunt uniform is not worn, the buttons are sometimes worn on a waistcoat. All members of the mounted field should carry a hunting whip (it should not be called a crop). These have a horn handle at the top and a long leather lash (2–3 yards or 2–2.5 m) ending in a piece of coloured cord. Generally all hunting whips are brown, except those of Hunt Servants, whose whips are white.

== Controversy ==
The nature of fox hunting, including the killing of the quarry animal, the pursuit's strong associations with tradition and social class, and its practice for sport have made it a source of great controversy within the United Kingdom. In December 1999, the then Home Secretary, Jack Straw MP, announced the establishment of a Government inquiry (the Burns Inquiry) into hunting with dogs, to be chaired by the retired senior civil servant Lord Burns. The inquiry was to examine the practical aspects of different types of hunting with dogs and its impact, how any ban might be implemented and the consequences of any such ban.

Amongst its findings, the Burns Inquiry committee analysed opposition to hunting in the UK and reported that:

There are those who have a moral objection to hunting and who are fundamentally opposed to the idea of people gaining pleasure from what they regard as the causing of unnecessary suffering. There are also those who perceive hunting as representing a divisive social class system. Others, as we note below, resent the hunt trespassing on their land, especially when they have been told they are not welcome. They worry about the welfare of the pets and animals and the difficulty of moving around the roads where they live on hunt days. Finally there are those who are concerned about damage to the countryside and other animals, particularly badgers and otters.

In a later debate in the House of Lords, the inquiry chairman, Lord Burns, also stated that "Naturally, people ask whether we were implying that hunting is cruel... The short answer to that question is no. There was not sufficient verifiable evidence or data safely to reach views about cruelty. It is a complex area."

Anti-hunting activists who choose to take action in opposing fox hunting can do so through lawful means, such as campaigning for fox hunting legislation and monitoring hunts for cruelty. Some use unlawful means. Main anti-hunting campaign organisations include the RSPCA and the League Against Cruel Sports. In 2001, the RSPCA took high court action to prevent pro-hunt activists joining in large numbers to change the society's policy in opposing hunting.

Outside of campaigning, some activists choose to engage in direct intervention such as sabotage of the hunt. Hunt sabotage is unlawful in a majority of the United States, and some tactics used in it (such as trespass and criminal damage) are offences there and in other countries.

Fox hunting with hounds has been happening in Europe since at least the sixteenth century, and strong traditions have built up around the activity, as have related businesses, rural activities, and hierarchies. For this reason, there are large numbers of people who support fox hunting and this can be for a variety of reasons.

=== Pest control ===
The fox is referred to as vermin in some countries. Some farmers fear the loss of their smaller livestock, while others consider them an ally in controlling rabbits, voles, and other rodents, which eat crops. A key reason for dislike of the fox by pastoral farmers is their tendency to commit acts of surplus killing toward animals such as chickens, since having killed many they eat only one. Some anti-hunt campaigners maintain that provided it is not disturbed, the fox will remove all of the chickens it kills and conceal them in a safer place.

Opponents of fox hunting claim that the activity is not necessary for fox control, arguing that the fox is not a pest species despite its classification and that hunting does not and cannot make a real difference to fox populations. They compare the number of foxes killed in the hunt to the many more killed on the roads. They also argue that wildlife management goals of the hunt can be met more effectively by other methods such as lamping (dazzling a fox with a bright light, then shooting by a competent shooter using an appropriate weapon and load).

There is scientific evidence that fox hunting has no effect on fox populations, at least in Britain, thereby calling into question the idea it is a successful method of culling. In 2001 there was a 1-year nationwide ban on fox-hunting because of an outbreak of foot-and-mouth disease. It was found this ban on hunting had no measurable impact on fox numbers in randomly selected areas. Prior to the fox hunting ban in the UK, hounds contributed to the deaths of 6.3% of the 400,000 foxes killed annually.

The hunts claim to provide and maintain a good habitat for foxes and other game, and, in the US, have fostered conservation legislation and put land into conservation easements. Anti-hunting campaigners cite the widespread existence of artificial earths and the historic practice by hunts of introducing foxes, as indicating that hunts do not believe foxes to be pests.

It is also argued that hunting with dogs has the advantage of weeding out old, sick, and weak animals because the strongest and healthiest foxes are those most likely to escape. Therefore, unlike other methods of controlling the fox population, it is argued that hunting with dogs resembles natural selection. The counter-argument is given that hunting cannot kill old foxes because foxes have a natural death rate of 65% per annum.

In Australia, where foxes have played a major role in the decline in the number of species of wild animals, the Government's Department of the Environment and Heritage concluded that "hunting does not seem to have had a significant or lasting impact on fox numbers." Instead, control of foxes relies heavily on shooting, poisoning and fencing.

=== Economics ===
As well as the economic defence of fox hunting that it is necessary to control the population of foxes, lest they cause economic cost to the farmers, it is also argued that fox hunting is a significant economic activity in its own right, providing recreation and jobs for those involved in the hunt and supporting it. The Burns Inquiry identified that between 6,000 and 8,000 full-time jobs depend on hunting in the UK, of which about 700 result from direct hunt employment and 1,500 to 3,000 result from direct employment on hunting-related activities.

Since the ban in the UK, there has been no evidence of significant job losses, and hunts have continued to operate along limited lines, either trail hunting, or claiming to use exemptions in the legislation.

=== Animal welfare and animal rights ===
Many animal welfare groups, campaigners and activists believe that fox hunting is unfair and cruel to animals. They argue that the chase itself causes fear and distress and that the fox is not always killed instantly as is claimed. Animal rights campaigners also object to hunting (including fox hunting), on the grounds that animals should enjoy some basic rights (such as the right to freedom from exploitation and the right to life).

In the United States and Canada, pursuing quarry for the purpose of killing is strictly forbidden by the Masters of Foxhounds Association. According to article 2 of the organisation's code:

The sport of fox hunting as it is practised in North America places emphasis on the chase and not the kill. It is inevitable, however, that hounds will at times catch their game. Death is instantaneous. A pack of hounds will account for their quarry by running it to ground, treeing it, or bringing it to bay in some fashion. The Masters of Foxhounds Association has laid down detailed rules to govern the behaviour of Masters of Foxhounds and their packs of hounds.

There are times when a fox that is injured or sick is caught by the pursuing hounds, but hunts say that the occurrence of an actual kill of this is exceptionally rare.

Supporters of hunting maintain that when foxes or other prey (such as coyotes in the western USA) are hunted, the quarry are either killed relatively quickly (instantly or in a matter of seconds) or escapes uninjured. Similarly, they say that the animal rarely endures hours of torment and pursuit by hounds, and research by Oxford University shows that the fox is normally killed after an average of 17 minutes of chase. They further argue that, while hunting with hounds may cause suffering, controlling fox numbers by other means is even more cruel. Depending on the skill of the shooter, the type of firearm used, the availability of good shooting positions and luck, shooting foxes can cause either an instant kill, or lengthy periods of agony for wounded animals which can die of the trauma within hours, or of secondary infection over a period of days or weeks. Research from wildlife hospitals, however, indicates that it is not uncommon for foxes with minor shot wounds to survive. Hunt supporters further say that it is a matter of humanity to kill foxes rather than allow them to suffer malnourishment and mange.

Other methods include the use of snares, trapping and poisoning, all of which also cause considerable distress to the animals concerned, and may affect other species. This was considered in the Burns Inquiry (paras 6.60–11), whose tentative conclusion was that lamping using rifles fitted with telescopic sights, if carried out properly and in appropriate circumstances, had fewer adverse welfare implications than hunting. The committee believed that lamping was not possible without vehicular access, and hence said that the welfare of foxes in upland areas could be affected adversely by a ban on hunting with hounds, unless dogs could be used to flush foxes from cover (as is permitted in the Hunting Act 2004).

Some opponents of hunting criticise the fact that the animal suffering in fox hunting takes place for sport, citing either that this makes such suffering unnecessary and therefore cruel, or else that killing or causing suffering for sport is immoral. The Court of Appeal, in considering the British Hunting Act, determined that the legislative aim of the Hunting Act was "a composite one of preventing or reducing unnecessary suffering to wild mammals, overlaid by a moral viewpoint that causing suffering to animals for sport is unethical."

Anti-hunting campaigners also criticised UK hunts of which the Burns Inquiry estimated that foxhound packs put down around 3,000 hounds, and the hare hunts killed around 900 hounds per year, in each case after the hounds' working life had come to an end.

In June 2016, three people associated with the South Herefordshire Hunt (UK) were arrested on suspicion of causing suffering to animals in response to claims that live fox cubs were used to train hounds to hunt and kill. The organisation Hunt Investigation Team supported by the League Against Cruel Sports, gained video footage of an individual carrying a fox cub into a large kennel where the hounds can clearly be heard baying. A dead fox was later found in a rubbish bin. The individuals arrested were suspended from Hunt membership. In August, two more people were arrested in connection with the investigation.

=== Civil liberties ===
It is argued by some hunt supporters that no law should curtail the right of a person to do as they wish, so long as it does not harm others. Philosopher Roger Scruton has said, "To criminalise this activity would be to introduce legislation as illiberal as the laws which once deprived Jews and Catholics of political rights, or the laws which outlawed homosexuality". In contrast, liberal philosopher, John Stuart Mill wrote, "The reasons for legal intervention in favour of children apply not less strongly to the case of those unfortunate slaves and victims of the most brutal parts of mankind—the lower animals." The UK's most senior court, the House of Lords, has decided that a ban on hunting, in the form of the Hunting Act 2004, does not contravene the European Convention on Human Rights, as did the European Court of Human Rights.

=== Trespass ===
In its submission to the Burns Inquiry, the League Against Cruel Sports presented evidence of over 1,000 cases of trespass by hunts. These included trespass on railway lines and into private gardens. Trespass can occur as the hounds cannot recognise human-created boundaries they are not allowed to cross, and may therefore follow their quarry wherever it goes unless successfully called off. However, in the United Kingdom, trespass is a largely civil matter when performed accidentally.

Nonetheless, in the UK, the criminal offence of 'aggravated trespass' was introduced in 1994 specifically to address the problems caused to fox hunts and other field sports by hunt saboteurs. Hunt saboteurs trespass on private land to monitor or disrupt the hunt, as this is where the hunting activity takes place. For this reason, the hunt saboteur tactics manual presents detailed information on legal issues affecting this activity, especially the Criminal Justice Act. Some hunt monitors also choose to trespass whilst they observe the hunts in progress.

The construction of the law means that hunt saboteurs' behaviour may result in charges of criminal aggravated trespass, rather than the less severe offence of civil trespass. Since the introduction of legislation to restrict hunting with hounds, there has been a level of confusion over the legal status of hunt monitors or saboteurs when trespassing, as if they disrupt the hunt whilst it is not committing an illegal act (as all the hunts claim to be hunting within the law) then they commit an offence; however, if the hunt was conducting an illegal act then the criminal offence of trespass may not have been committed.

=== Social life and class issues in Britain ===
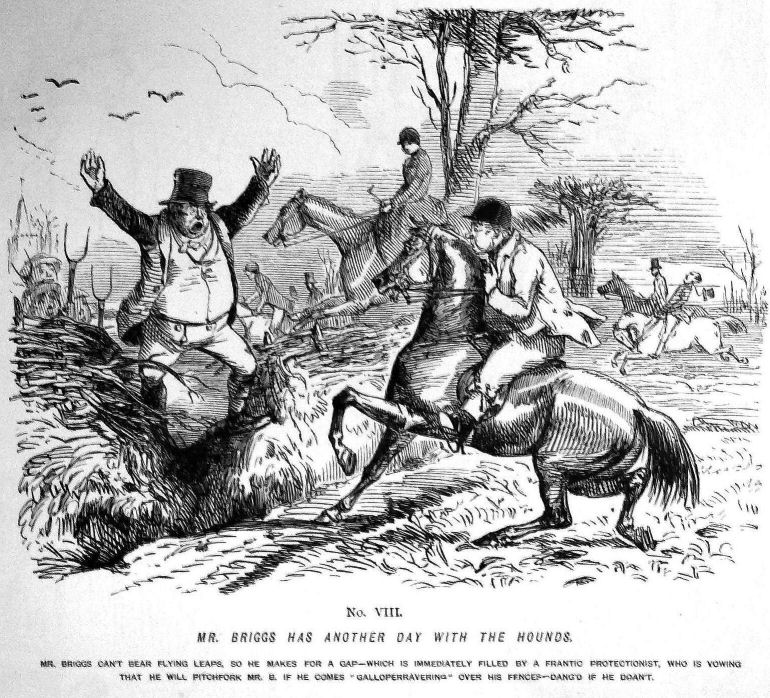
Punch magazine's "Mr. Briggs" cartoons illustrated issues over fox hunting during the 1850s.

In Britain, and especially in England and Wales, supporters of fox hunting regard it as a distinctive part of British culture generally, the basis of traditional crafts and a key part of social life in rural areas, an activity and spectacle enjoyed not only by the riders but also by others such as the unmounted pack which may follow along on foot, bicycle or 4×4 vehicles. They see the social aspects of hunting as reflecting the demographics of the area; the Home Counties packs, for example, are very different from those in North Wales and Cumbria, where the hunts are very much the activity of farmers and the working class. The Banwen Miners Hunt is such a working class club, founded in a small Welsh mining village, although its membership now is by no means limited to miners, with a more cosmopolitan make-up.

Oscar Wilde, in his play A Woman of No Importance (1893), once famously described "the English country gentleman galloping after a fox" as "the unspeakable in full pursuit of the uneatable." Even before the time of Wilde, much of the criticism of fox hunting was couched in terms of social class. The argument was that while more "working class" blood sports such as cock fighting and badger baiting were long ago outlawed, fox hunting persists, although this argument can be countered with the fact that hare coursing, a more "working-class" sport, was outlawed at the same time as fox hunting with hounds in England and Wales. The philosopher Roger Scruton has said that the analogy with cockfighting and badger baiting is unfair, because these sports were more cruel and did not involve any element of pest control.

A series of "Mr. Briggs" cartoons by John Leech appeared in the magazine Punch during the 1850s which illustrated class issues. More recently the British anarchist group Class War has argued explicitly for disruption of fox hunts on class warfare grounds and even published a book The Rich at Play examining the subject. Other groups with similar aims, such as "Revolutions per minute" have also published papers which disparage fox hunting on the basis of the social class of its participants.

Opinion polls in the United Kingdom have shown that the population is equally divided as to whether or not the views of hunt objectors are based primarily on class grounds. Some people have pointed to evidence of class bias in the voting patterns in the House of Commons during the voting on the hunting bill between 2000 and 2001, with traditionally working-class Labour members voting the legislation through against the votes of normally middle- and upper-class Conservative members.

== See also ==
- Beagling
- Trail hunting
- Coon hunting
- Otter hunting
- Drag hunting
- Duck netting
- Fox tossing
- Hunting and shooting in the United Kingdom
- Hunting the clean boot
- List of foxhound packs of the United Kingdom
- Mink hunting
- Scent hound
- Wolf hunting
- Montería (hunt)
