= Protection of Wild Mammals (Scotland) Act 2002 =

Act of the Scottish Parliament

Protection of Wild Mammals (Scotland) Act 2002 (Note: Section 12(1).)
- Act of the Scottish Parliament
- Scottish Parliament
- Long title: An Act of the Scottish Parliament to protect wild mammals from being hunted with dogs; and for connected purposes.
- Citation: 2002 asp 6
- Introduced by: Mike Watson
- Territorial extent: Scotland

Dates
- Royal assent: 15 March 2002
- Commencement: 1 August 2002 (Note: Section 12(2). The Protection of Wild Mammals (Scotland) Act 2002 (Commencement) Order 2002.)
- Repealed: 3 October 2023

Other legislation
- Amends: Dogs (Protection of Livestock) Act 1953; Protection of Badgers Act 1992
- Repealed by: Hunting with Dogs (Scotland) Act 2023
- Relates to: Hunting Act 2004

Status: Repealed

Text of statute as originally enacted

Revised text of statute as amended

The Protection of Wild Mammals (Scotland) Act 2002 (asp 6) was an act of the Scottish Parliament passed in February 2002, making Scotland the first part of the United Kingdom to ban traditional fox hunting and hare coursing. It was repealed in 2023.

== Passage of the act ==
The bill was introduced into the Scottish Parliament in 1999 by Mike Watson MSP with support from SNP MSP Tricia Marwick. In September 2001, the Scottish Parliament rejected a negative committee report about the Bill from its Rural Development Committee and voted to support the general principles of the Bill. On 13 February 2002 the Parliament voted by eighty-three to thirty-six to pass the legislation to ban hunting with dogs. MSPs decided not to give compensation to those whose livelihoods or businesses might suffer as a result of the ban. The Scottish Countryside Alliance attempted to block introduction of the legislation by taking their case to the Court of Session in Edinburgh, although their appeal was not successful and in July the Judge recognised the will of the Parliament on this issue. The Act came into effect on 1 August 2002.

== Impact of the ban ==
An article in The Guardian on 9 September 2004 reported that of the ten Scottish hunts, nine survived the ban, using the permitted exemption allowing them to use packs of hounds to flush foxes to guns (an exemption strongly opposed by people against hunting).

A number of convictions took place under the act, two for people hunting foxes and ten for hare coursing. The only prosecution of a traditional fox hunt led to a not guilty verdict, but to a clarification of the law, with the sheriff saying that the activity of flushing foxes to guns "will require to be accompanied by realistic and one would expect, effective arrangements for the shooting of pest species. The use of what might be termed "token guns" or what was described by the Crown as paying lip service to the legislation is not available ... as a justification for the continuation of what was referred to in the evidence before me as traditional fox hunting."

There is controversy over the impact on the number of foxes killed by hunts. Hunts said that the number killed by hunts doubled because shooting is more effective than chasing with dogs.

Following the ban, two new fox hunts started in Scotland, the Strathappin and the Dumfriesshire and Stewartry.

== 2016 review ==
In December 2015, the Scottish Government announced that a review would be held that would look at legislation dealing with hunting with dogs, with the review to be led by Lord Bonomy. In November 2016 a report was published with various recommendations, including making amendments to the law.

== Replacement ==
The 2002 act was repealed and replaced by the Hunting with Dogs (Scotland) Act 2023.

== See also ==
- Animal law
- Fox hunting legislation
- Hunting Act 2004
