= Hunting Act 2004 =

Act of the Parliament of the United Kingdom

Hunting Act 2004 (Note: Section 16.)
- Act of Parliament
- Parliament of the United Kingdom
- Long title: An Act to make provision about hunting wild mammals with dogs; to prohibit hare coursing; and for connected purposes.
- Citation: 2004 c. 37
- Territorial extent: England and Wales (Note: Section 17.)

Dates
- Royal assent: 18 November 2004
- Commencement: 18 February 2005 (Note: Section 15.)
Other legislation
Amends	Game Act 1831; Game Licences Act 1860; Protection of Animals Act 1911; Protection of Badgers Act 1992; Wild Mammals (Protection) Act 1996
Amended by	Serious Organised Crime and Police Act 2005

Status: Amended

Text of statute as originally enacted

Revised text of statute as amended

The Hunting Act 2004 (c. 37) is an act of the Parliament of the United Kingdom which bans the hunting of most wild mammals (notably foxes, deer, hares and mink) with dogs in England and Wales, subject to some strictly limited exemptions; the act does not cover the use of dogs in the process of flushing out an unidentified wild mammal, nor does it affect drag hunting, where hounds are trained to follow an artificial scent.

The act came into force on 18 February 2005. The pursuit of foxes with hounds, other than to flush out to be shot, had been banned in Scotland two years earlier by the Protection of Wild Mammals (Scotland) Act 2002. Such hunting remains permitted by the law in Northern Ireland, where the act does not apply.

== History ==
=== Background ===
Several UK laws on animal welfare, such as the Protection of Animals Act 1911, the Protection of Badgers Act 1992 and the Wild Mammals (Protection) Act 1996 contained specific exemptions for hunting activities, thereby preventing prosecutions of other hunts activities that might otherwise have been considered cruel.

Many earlier attempts had been made to ban hunting. Two private member's bills to ban, or restrict, hunting were introduced in 1949, but one was withdrawn and the other defeated on its second reading in the House of Commons. The Labour government appointed a Select Committee on Cruelty to Wild Animals, chaired by John Scott-Henderson KC, to investigate all forms of hunting, and it published a report in 1951. Opponents of hunting claimed that the membership of the committee had been chosen to produce a pro-hunting report. The inquiry reported its view that "Fox hunting makes a very important contribution to the control of foxes and involves less cruelty than most other methods of controlling them. It should therefore be allowed to continue." The select committee was unanimous in recommending no action on hunting, but it made proposals on the use of spring traps.

Twice, in 1969 and in 1975, the House of Commons voted in favour of bills to ban hare coursing, but neither bill became law. Three further private member's bills were introduced by Kevin McNamara in 1992 (Wild Mammals (Protection) Bill), by Tony Banks in 1993 (Fox Hunting (Abolition) Bill), and by John McFall in 1995 (Wild Mammals (Protection) Bill)—all of which failed to go on to become law.

The Protection of Wild Mammals (Scotland) Act 2002 made it unlawful to chase or deliberately kill mammals with dogs in 2002. There are a number of differences between the two acts: The Scottish act does not place a two dog limit on the flushing of a mammal to guns in order to shoot it; with respect to flushing foxes above ground to guns to shoot them, only the Scottish act permits this to be done to protect game birds; with respect to flushing foxes below ground to guns to shoot them, only the Scottish act permits this to be done to protect livestock. The Scottish act allows someone convicted to be sentenced for up to six months in prison, there is no such power in the Hunting Act 2004.

At the time of this bill fox hunting with hounds was "not practised or is largely banned" in Belgium, Denmark, Finland, Germany, Norway, Spain and Sweden, but was allowed in Australia, Canada, France, India, Ireland, Italy, Russia and the USA.

=== Drafting ===
The Labour Party came to power in 1997 with a manifesto saying, "We will ensure greater protection for wildlife. We have advocated new measures to promote animal welfare, including a free vote in Parliament on whether hunting with hounds should be banned." A new private member's bill, introduced by Michael Foster MP, received a second reading with 411 MPs voting in support, but failed due to lack of parliamentary time. The Burns Report in 2000 concluded that forms of fox hunting "seriously compromise the welfare of the fox", but (in line with its remit) did not draw any conclusion on whether hunting should be banned or should continue. In a later debate in the House of Lords, the inquiry chairman, Lord Burns also stated that "Naturally, people ask whether we were implying that hunting is cruel... The short answer to that question is no. There was not sufficient verifiable evidence or data safely to reach views about cruelty. It is a complex area." Following the Burns inquiry, the Government introduced an 'options bill' which allowed each House of Parliament to choose between a ban, licensed hunting, and self-regulation. The House of Commons voted for a banning bill and the House of Lords for self-regulation. The 2001 general election was then called and the bill ran out of parliamentary time.

In what he described as an attempt to raise animal welfare standards at the same time, and as an alternative to legislation that specifically targeted hunting, Lord Donoughue proposed the Wild Mammals (Protection) (Amendment) Bill. This would have made it the case that "any person who intentionally inflicts, or causes or procures, unnecessary suffering on or to any wild mammal shall be guilty of an offence." A matching Bill was introduced in the Commons with the support of The Middle Way Group (see below). Both bills failed to become law as they were blocked by Labour members who wanted a specific hunting ban. Animal welfare groups such as the League Against Cruel Sports criticised the Bill on two grounds. Firstly, they opposed the exemption in the Bill for activities undertaken "in accordance with an approved code of conduct". Secondly, they argued that, if an activity was inherently cruel, it should be deemed as such by Parliament, rather than prosecutors having to argue and prove cruelty in every court case.

Following a series of evidence hearings in 2002, on 3 December 2002, DEFRA Minister of State for Rural Affairs Alun Michael introduced a bill which would have allowed some licensed hunting. In July 2003, by a majority of 208 in a free vote, the Commons passed an amendment proposed by Tony Banks to ban hunting entirely, but in October 2003 this was rejected by the House of Lords by a majority of 212.

== Voting, conflict with the Lords and royal assent ==
A bill identical to the one passed by the House of Commons in 2003 was reintroduced to the Commons on 9 September 2004.

On 15 September 2004, the day of the final vote (third reading) on the bill, two protesters staged the first invasion of the House of Commons chamber since King Charles I in 1641. The protesters were quickly removed by Parliamentary officials, but the incident led to a review of parliamentary security, given that it was the second breach of the security of the chamber in four months (Fathers 4 Justice activists had thrown purple flour in the Commons four months earlier). Simultaneously, a demonstration of between 8,000 and 10,000 people, including protesters from the Countryside Alliance filled Parliament Square outside. Later, John Holliday wrote for the Guardian an essay on his actions.

On 17 November, on one of the days of the Parliamentary session, the Lords again insisted on its amendments to the main bill. In the Commons, the Government's last-ditch attempt to compromise on a delay until 31 July 2007 won the support of only 46 MPs, although the delay until 2006 was inserted in the bill. The Lords, who would have had to have accepted the Commons' other amendments (including the principle of a ban on hunting) and dues, rejected the proposal by 153 to 114.

With the Lords and Commons unable to come to agreement by the end of the Parliamentary year the Speaker of the House of Commons, Michael Martin, invoked the Parliament Acts 1911 and 1949, an infrequently used legislative device that allows the Commons to overrule the Lords where agreement can not be reached. The Hunting Act was only the seventh statute since 1911 enacted using these provisions. The House of Lords was criticised for undemocratically blocking the legislation; however, other newspapers and broadcasters condemned Tony Blair's Labour administration for giving in to what they perceived as the prejudicial views of anti-hunting Labour backbenchers.

The act came into force on 18 February 2005, three calendar months after it received royal assent.

== Exempt hunting ==
The Act exempts some limited forms of hunting believed to be necessary. Hunting with dogs is exempt from the Act if it falls within a class listed in Schedule 1, which may be amended by an Order made by the Secretary of State for the Environment.

Schedule 1 of the Act specifies nine forms of hunting with dogs which are exempt, subject to conditions in each case:

1. Stalking and flushing out
2. Use of dogs below ground to protect birds for shooting
3. Rats
4. Rabbits
5. Retrieval of hares
6. Falconry
7. Recapture of wild mammal
8. Rescue of wild mammal
9. Research and observation

The Countryside Alliance has noted that "The Act makes it an offence to hunt a mouse with a dog but not a rat, you can legally hunt a rabbit but not a hare. You can flush a fox to guns with two dogs legally but if you use three it's an offence. You can flush a fox to a bird of prey with as many dogs as you like."

=== Stalking and flushing out ===
Traditionally, in some upland areas, foxes were flushed by packs of dogs to be shot.

Stalking and flushing out are exempt under the Act, subject to five conditions:

Firstly, the stalking or flushing out is for the purpose of preventing or reducing serious damage which the wild mammal would otherwise cause to livestock, to game birds or wild birds, to food for livestock, to crops, to growing timber, to fisheries, to other property, or to biological diversity; or for obtaining meat for human or animal consumption; or for participation in a field trial competition in which dogs flush animals out of cover and/or retrieve animals that have been shot.

Secondly, the stalking or flushing out must take place on land which belongs to the person doing the stalking or flushing out or which he has been given permission to use for the purpose.

Thirdly, only one or two dogs may be used.

Fourthly, the use of a dog below ground is limited as in the next section.

Fifthly, reasonable steps must be taken to ensure that as soon as possible after being found or flushed out, the wild mammal is shot dead by a competent person, and that each dog used is kept under sufficiently close control to ensure that it does not obstruct the prevention or reduction of serious damage.

Flushing to guns is still permitted in Scotland under the Protection of Wild Mammals (Scotland) Act 2002. However MPs, in making law for England and Wales, decided that this activity did result in unnecessary suffering, not least because it is more difficult to control a large number of hounds in dense woodland where this activity used to take place.

This exemption was claimed by one stag hound pack in the Exmoor area. In an appeal judgment following the conviction of two stag hunt officials, the judge said that such hunting conducted primarily for recreation was unlawful.

=== Use of dogs below ground to protect birds for shooting ===
Hunting below ground often took place with terriers, and the Act outlaws hunting with terriers, apart from a narrowly drawn exemption, described by the Minister, Alun Michael MP, as existing "for gamekeepers".

The use of one such dog is exempt, but only in the course of stalking or flushing out, and in accordance with four conditions.

The activity must be carried out "for the purpose of preventing or reducing serious damage to gamebirds or wild birds which a person is keeping or preserving for the purpose of their being shot."

The stalker or person doing the flushing out must have written evidence that the land concerned belongs to him, or that he has been given permission to use it for the purpose, and must make the evidence immediately available for inspection by a constable who asks to see it.

Only one dog can be used below ground at any time.

Reasonable steps must be taken to ensure that

- as soon as possible after being found the wild mammal is flushed out from below ground and is shot dead by a competent person
- the dog is under close control
- injury to the dog is prevented; and
- the use of the dog complies with any code of practice issued or approved by the Secretary of State.

Despite this, many fox hunts continue to use terriers regularly. Three people, not associated with hunts, have pleaded guilty to offences under the Hunting Act 2004 for hunting with terriers and a fourth was found guilty after a trial.

=== Hunting rats and rabbits ===
In enacting the Hunting Act, parliament accepted the view that the hunting of rats and rabbits is legitimate, as they are pests. Parliament did not believe there was any necessity to use dogs to hunt mice, so provided no such exemption.

The hunting of rats and rabbits is exempt only if it takes place on land which belongs to the hunter, or which he has been given permission to use for the purpose by the occupier or (if unoccupied) by an owner.

=== Retrieval of hares ===
The hunting of a hare which has been shot is exempt if it takes place on land which belongs to the hunter, or which he has been given permission to use for the purpose.

In a private prosecution under the Act brought by the International Fund for Animal Welfare (IFAW) who had observed two hare coursing events in villages near Malton, North Yorkshire in March 2007 organised by the Yorkshire Greyhound Field Trialling Club, the District Judge in Scarborough magistrates court clarified that the club was mistaken in believing that because the dogs they had been using were muzzled, the practice was lawful.

=== Falconry ===
In making falconry an exempt form of hunting, the Act lays down two conditions.

"Flushing a wild mammal from cover is exempt hunting if undertaken for the purpose of enabling a bird of prey to hunt the wild mammal."

Such activity must be done on land which belongs to the hunter or which he has been given permission to use for the purpose.

Many traditional hunts have bought birds of prey and say that they are using hounds to flush foxes to the bird of prey. Many experts, such as the Hawk Board, deny that any bird of prey can reasonably be used in the British countryside to kill a fox which has been flushed by (and is being chased by) a pack of hounds. If this view proves to be correct, then it is unlikely that such a use of dogs is lawful.

Expert opinion on the limitations of flushing foxes to birds of prey will be available to advise courts considering such cases, when they are litigated. For now, the question of what is lawful remains to be determined.

=== Recapture of wild mammal ===
This exemption is for the hunting of a wild mammal which has escaped or been released from captivity, subject to these conditions:

The activity must take place on land which belongs to the hunter, or on land which he has been given permission to use for the purpose, or with the authority of a constable.

Reasonable steps must be taken to ensure that as soon as possible after being found the wild mammal is recaptured or shot dead by a competent person, and that each dog used in the hunt is kept under close control.

The wild mammal must not have been released or allowed to escape for the purpose of being hunted.

=== Rescue of wild mammal ===
The hunting of an injured wild mammal is exempt, subject to these conditions:

The hunter must reasonably believe that the wild mammal is or may be injured.

The hunting must be for the purpose of relieving the wild mammal's suffering.

No more than two dogs may be used.

There must be no use of a dog below ground.

The activity must take place on land which belongs to the hunter or which he has been given permission to use for the purpose or with the authority of a constable.

Reasonable steps must be taken to ensure that as soon as possible after the wild mammal is found appropriate action (if any) is taken to relieve its suffering, and that each dog used in the hunt is kept under close control.

The wild mammal must not have been harmed to enable it to be hunted under this exemption.

=== Research and observation ===
The last form of exempt hunting which is provided for in the Act is subject to these conditions:

The hunting must be undertaken "for the purpose of or in connection with the observation or study of the wild mammal."

No more than two dogs may be used, and no dog below ground.

The activity must take place on land which belongs to the hunter, or which he has been given permission to use for the purpose.

Each dog used must be kept under close control to ensure that it does not injure the wild mammal.

== Failed challenges ==
Challenges to the Act which questioning the legality of the Parliament Act 1949 in the High Court and Court of Appeal failed (for example Jackson v Attorney General). The House of Lords in their judicial capacity agreed with the lower courts in a judgment delivered in October 2005.

An application for judicial review was made to the High Court of England and Wales which argued that the anti-hunting legislation contravenes individual human or property rights protected in the European Convention on Human Rights (ECHR) and under European Community law and on grounds of the free movement of goods and services. The application was dismissed by the High Court in July 2005, the Court of Appeal in June 2006 and the House of Lords in November 2007. An application to the European Court of Human Rights was ruled inadmissible.

== Penalties and enforcement ==
A person guilty of an offence under this Act is liable on summary conviction to an unlimited fine at the discretion of judges. (The provisions of the law state a penalty not exceeding level 5 on the standard scale, however, level 5 currently has no upper limit).

Analysis published in 2015 by pro-hunting pressure group the Countryside Alliance of 2005-14 data from the Ministry of Justice shows that 378 people have been convicted of Hunting Act offences over that period, but only 24 of the offenders were involved with registered hunts. They therefore conclude that more than 94% of Hunting Act convicted offenders were not members of registered hunts but were involved in poaching or other casual hunting activities. Justice Minister Crispin Blunt said in a written answer to Parliament in June 2011 that "it is not possible to separately identify those specific cases proceeded against under the Hunting Act 2004 related to hunts recognised and regulated by the Council of Hunting Associations" since "statistical information available centrally does not include the circumstances of each case." In 2014, the number of successful convictions under the act had risen to 430.

Animal welfare groups such as the RSPCA, IFAW and the League Against Cruel Sports monitor some hunts, which they believe may be breaking the law. Small, local groups of Hunt Monitors, made up of independent, private individuals, also engage in regular hunt monitoring. In 2011 the League Against Cruel Sports complained that "On several occasions over the last few years, we have provided what we believed to be good evidence to Devon & Cornwall Police, but the police haven't even moved from the starting blocks by interviewing suspects. Some cases have run out of time and sometimes the Crown Prosecution Service (CPS) decide to take no action."

Police forces have said, on a number of occasions, that enforcement of the Hunting Act 2004 like much wildlife crime is a low priority for them, although they say that they will enforce the law. However, the Police's UK National Wildlife Crime Unit has said that policing of hunting should be a priority for forces in some areas of the country, most notably the South West.

== Key court cases involving registered hunts ==
=== Tony Wright (Exmoor Foxhounds): 2006–2009 ===
Tony Wright, huntsman for the Exmoor Foxhounds, was convicted of illegal hunting with dogs in Barnstaple magistrates court in August 2006 in a private prosecution by the League Against Cruel Sports, but was then acquitted by the High Court on appeal. The appeal took place at the request of the Crown Prosecution Service who wished to determine if it is necessary for the prosecution to demonstrate that any hunting taking place was not exempt, or for the defence to prove that it was exempt; also to define what was meant by "hunting". The High Court ruled that it was necessary for the prosecution to prove that the conditions of the exemption had not been met. It also ruled that for the offence of "hunting a wild mammal" to take place there must be an identifiable mammal.

=== Julian Barnfield (Heythrop Hunt): 2009 ===
Charges of illegal hunting of a fox between November 2008 and February 2009 brought against Julian Barnfield of the Heythrop Hunt by the Crown Prosecution Service were dropped in March 2009 in response to the earlier High Court ruling in the Tony Wright case that 'searching' for a mammal was not hunting and that "hunting could only be an 'intentional' activity".

=== Derek Hopkins and Kevin Allen (Fernie Hunt): 2011 ===
Huntsman Derek Hopkins and terrierman Kevin Allen, employees of the Fernie Hunt from Great Bowden, were convicted of illegal hunting in October 2011. They also lost their appeal, partly based on video evidence collected by the League Against Cruel Sports. It was the third successful prosecution for illegal fox hunting using the 2004 Act.

=== Crawley and Horsham Hunt: 2008–2013 ===
In 2008, the Crawley and Horsham Hunt launched a legal action in the High Court for trespass, nuisance, and harassment against Simon and Jane Wild of West Sussex Wildlife Protection and West Sussex Badger Protection Group. The hunt used Timothy Lawson-Cruttenden, an expert in the use of the Protection from Harassment Act 1997 in such cases. This was viewed as a test case and received support from the Countryside Alliance, the Master of Foxhounds Association and 80 landowners and if successful was planned to lead to a request for an injunction against everyone associated with these groups from interfering with the hunt. The defendants claimed to have evidence of illegal hunting taking place and were asking the court to accept this as a defence to the Harassment Act action. The original judge, Justice Cranston, stepped down in July 2008 due to earlier comments made in support of the ban made while an MP. During the second trial it was reported that the judge dismissed nuisance and trespass, because they had "fundamental defects", leaving only harassment. It was also reported that the protestors, using an undercover infiltrator, had been able to get hold of conclusive evidence that the claimants were engaged in illegal fox hunting. The principal plaintiff, Simon Greenwood, was filmed using his hounds to chase a fox to ground and then call in terrier-men to dig it out and throw it to the hounds. The plaintiffs dropped the case in July 2009, and agreed to pay costs estimated at over £120,000.

Officials of the Crawley and Horsham Hunt were found guilty in May 2012 of Hunting Act offences: professional huntsman Andrew Phillis, joint master Neill Millard and the hunt secretary Rachel Holdsworth were convicted on a total of five charges of illegally hunting. Millard and Holdsworth were fined £1000 each and both ordered to pay £2500 costs. Phillis was later sentenced to a £500 fine and £2500 costs.

In September 2013, professional huntsman Nicholas Bycroft pleaded guilty to an offence under Section 1 of the Hunting Act: he admitted illegally hunting a fox during a meet at Angmering Park, near Arundel, West Sussex, on 19 February 2013. He was given a 12-month conditional discharge, £150 costs and £15 victim surcharge.

=== RSPCA vs Heythrop Hunt: 2012 ===
In December 2012 the RSPCA took out a private prosecution against Heythrop Hunt Limited. This was a landmark case, as it was the first time that an organized hunt was prosecuted as a corporate body. The Heythrop Hunt, its Huntsman, Julian Barnfield, and its Senior Master, Richard Sumner, all pleaded guilty to four charges of illegally hunting a fox at Oxford magistrates court in December 2012. Barnfield, a former huntsman with the Heythrop and one of those convicted, said that the case had been politically motivated with its links with David Cameron's constituency. The presiding magistrate called the RSPCA's £327,000 costs "staggering"; however, Gavin Grant, the chief executive of the RSPCA, said that the organisation would prevent cruelty to animals by all lawful means and had prosecuted 1,341 individuals and secured 3,114 convictions in the past year with a success rate of more than 98%.

=== Other cases ===
Subsequently, three pending prosecutions against hunts, including one brought privately by the League Against Cruel Sports, were dropped and a further two cases which did reach court were thrown out at the conclusion of the prosecution cases when the District Judges ruled that there was no case to answer.

From March to November 2013, staff of six separate hunts were either acquitted of Hunting Act offences or had the prosecutions against them dropped, including three foxhound packs (The York & Ainsty South, the Avon Vale and the Ledbury), a harrier pack (Weston & Banwell Harriers), a staghound pack (The Quantock Staghounds) and a beagle pack (The RAC Beagles).

In September 2013 David Parker, the huntsman of the Seavington Hunt, was fined after he admitted illegally hunting a fox with dogs in Dorset. The prosecution was brought by the RSPCA with evidence from the International Fund for Animal Welfare (IFAW).

== Perspectives ==
=== Public opinion ===
Public opinion has tended to be in favour of the ban on fox hunting:

- A survey commissioned by The Daily Telegraph in 2002 indicated that a majority of people (57%) agreed with the statement that 'hunting with dogs is never acceptable'.
- A survey by MORI for the BBC carried out in February 2005 found that there was a plurality of support for the new legislation, but not an absolute majority (47% supporting, 26% opposed).
- In 2009, Ipsos MORI found that a total of 75% supported the ban on fox hunting.
- In 2010, the figure was almost identical, with 76% being opposed to repealing the Hunting Act, including with 71% of rural residents. There was 18% support for repeal.
- A poll by MORI in December 2012 showed no change on fox hunting, with 76% being opposed to moves to make it legal, rising to 81% in respect to deer hunting.
- Ahead of Boxing Day 2016 a poll was released which indicated opposition to fox hunting had reached all-time highs, with 84% of voters, including 82% of those in rural areas, opposing fox hunting.
- An opinion poll in May 2017 revealed overwhelming public opposition to hunting with dogs, including the repeal of the Hunting Act 2004. 64% of voters disagreed with the statement that "the ban on fox hunting should be reversed", including 46% who "strongly disagreed". Just 11% supported the repeal of the ban. The poll was published in the aftermath of the release of the Conservative Party manifesto for the 2017 general election, which promised a vote on the repeal of the Act. Only 16% of Conservative voters want the ban overturned, with 50% opposed.

=== Supporters of the bill ===
- Royal Society for the Prevention of Cruelty to Animals (RSPCA), charity operating in England and Wales which promotes animal welfare
- League Against Cruel Sports, a UK-based animal welfare charity which campaigns to stop blood sports such as fox hunting, hare and deer hunting; game bird shooting; and animal fighting
- Hunt Saboteurs Association, a United Kingdom organisation that uses hunt sabotage as a means of direct action to stop fox hunting
- Animal Welfare Party, is a minor political party in the United Kingdom campaigning on an animal welfare, environment and health platform
- Patrick Moore, an amateur astronomer who attained prominence in that field as a writer, researcher, radio commentator and television presenter
- Conservatives Against Fox Hunting
- Conservative MPs Caroline Dinenage, Tracey Crouch, Mike Weatherley, Dominic Raab, Sir Roger Gale, Stuart Andrew, Simon Kirby, Caroline Ansell, Ann Widdecombe and Lee Scott
- Brian May, musician, songwriter, record producer, animal rights activist and astrophysicist.
- Paul McCartney, singer, songwriter and musician
- Ricky Gervais, comedian, actor, writer, producer, and director
- Roger Moore, actor

=== Opponents of the bill ===
- Countryside Alliance
- Theresa May, later Prime Minister
- Clarissa Dickson Wright, celebrity cook, writer, journalist and TV host
- Charles III, later King of the United Kingdom and the 14 other Commonwealth realms, allegedly commented that "if hunting was banned, he might as well leave the country and spend the rest of his life skiing".
- Jeremy Irons, actor and activist
- Jeremy Clarkson, journalist and broadcaster
- Otis Ferry, son of musician Bryan Ferry
- Roger Waters, bassist in Pink Floyd
- Game and Wildlife Conservation Trust, a British charitable organisation using science to promote game and wildlife management as an essential part of nature conservation
- Farmers' Union of Wales, a member organisation, was formed in 1955 to protect and advance the interests of those who derive an income from Welsh agriculture
- The Middle Way Group, a group of Conservative, Labour, Liberal Democrat and Plaid Cymru parliamentarians
- Union of Country Sports Workers, a former trade union

=== Neutral ===
- National Farmers Union, a member organisation/industry association for farmers in England and Wales

== Proposed Coalition review ==
The Conservative – Liberal Democrat Coalition Agreement, agreed by the new government following the 2010 general election, aimed to give MPs a free vote "to express its view" on repealing the Hunting Act 2004 when parliamentary time allowed; in late 2010, it was thought this might be in "early 2012". The prime minister, David Cameron, explained in January 2012 "I always thought the hunting ban was a pretty bizarre piece of legislation ... I think there should be a free vote in the House of Commons. I think the Commons should make its mind up about this. My problem has always been that it was just taking the criminal law into an area of activity where it didn't really belong." However, in December 2012 Owen Paterson, the Environment Secretary, said that there was no immediate likelihood of winning a Commons vote to make hunting legal again and that supporters of hunting would need to do "more work" to win over sceptical MPs.

== Proposed Conservative amendments ==
The 2015 Conservative Government proposed "technical" amendments to the Act. These were officially postponed on 14 July 2015.

At the 2017 election Theresa May pledged to hold a free vote on repealing the Hunting Act if the Conservative Party won a majority. These plans were scrapped in January 2018.

At the 2019 election the Conservative Party announced that they would not make any changes to the Hunting Act leading to suggestions that the Conservatives would no longer oppose the Hunting Ban.

== See also ==
- Animal law
- Beagling
