= Radnor Hunt =

American fox hunting club

Radnor Hunt is the oldest continuous fox-hunting club in the United States recognized by the Masters of Foxhounds Association of North America.

== Overview ==
Radnor Hunt was founded in 1883 in Pennsylvania. A property was purchased on the corner of Darby-Paoli and Roberts Roads in Newtown Township, Delaware County, Pennsylvania, and it became the club headquarters.

From its early days, it attracted members of prominent families from Philadelphia and the Philadelphia Main Line, also known as "Old Philadelphians". For example, Alexander Cassatt (1839–1906), the seventh president of the Pennsylvania Railroad (PRR), was a founding member. The first President was James Rawle of the J. G. Brill Company, and the first Master of Foxhounds was Horace B. Montgomery. Later, Samuel D. Riddle (1861–1951) joined the club.

M. Roy Jackson served as master of foxhounds for Radnor Hunt from 1929 to 1944.

In 1931, architect Arthur Ingersoll Meigs (1882–1956), who was a member of the hunt, restored the Gallagher Farm on Boot Road (now Providence Road) in White Horse, Pennsylvania as well as new stables and kennels. It became the new club headquarters.

The club is recognized by the Masters of Foxhounds Association of America. Memberships are cited in the Social Register.

== Leadership ==
- President: Janice Murdoch .
- Vice President: J. Wesley Hardin.
- Treasurer: Stephen E. Flynn II
- Secretary: Jane Taylor.

== Bibliography ==
- Collin F. McNeil, Bright Hunting Morn: The 125th Anniversary of the Radnor Hunt (New York, New York: The Derrydale Press, 2009)
