= Hunt Saboteurs Association =

UK anti-hunting organisation

- Formation: 1963 (60 years ago)
- Founder: John Prestige
- Founded at: Brixham, England
- Type: Animal rights group
- Legal status: Active
- Region served: United Kingdom (with international affiliates)
- Methods: Direct action, hunt sabotage
- Members: 58 affiliated groups (2021)
- Secessions: Band of Mercy/Animal Liberation Front (1972)
- Website: www.huntsabs.org.uk

The Hunt Saboteurs Association (HSA) is a United Kingdom organisation that uses hunt sabotage as a means of direct action to stop fox hunting. It was founded in 1963, with its first sabotage event occurring at the South Devon Foxhounds on 26 December (Boxing Day) 1963.

== History ==
In 1963, John Prestige founded the Hunt Saboteurs Association in Brixham, England, after being assigned to report on the Devon and Somerset Staghounds, where "he witnessed the hunters drive a deer into a village and kill her."

Within a year, HSA affiliates were founded across England in Devon, Somerset, Avon, Birmingham, Hampshire and Surrey; the HSA now operates throughout Europe and North America.

Ronnie Lee, founder of the animal rights group Band of Mercy (a forerunner to the Animal Liberation Front), began his activism with an HSA group in Luton, England.

In 1974, it was publicized that David McCalden, a member of the HSA and the editor of their journal, HOWL, was a neo-Nazi and a member of the National Front. This resulted in bad press for the HSA, and the organisation held on a vote on whether to expel him in 1978; while some opposed his expulsion or abstained from voting against him (including Ronnie Lee), McCalden was expelled that year.

== Tactics ==
The HSA uses tactics including hunting horns and whistles to misdirect hounds, spraying scent dullers, laying false trails, and locking gates to interfere with the progress of a hunt. In the mid-1990s, members used a "gizmo" (a portable cassette tape player linked up to a megaphone or other portable amplification equipment) to play the sound of hounds in cry, causing the dogs to break off the chase. These are documented examples of HSA tactics.

The HSA has expanded into Europe, Canada and the United States, and have adapted their tactics depending on the type of hunting being disrupted. The HSA have disrupted deer, waterfowl, turkey, mink and hare hunts, as well as angling and other types of fishing. As a result, some US states have passed laws forbidding the disruption of legal hunting activities.

HSA UK has published a quarterly journal, Howl, since 1973.

== Controversy ==
Hunt saboteurs have been seriously injured after clashes with hunters.

A public order act was created to help control HSA members on private land. Part V Criminal Justice and Public Order Act 1994 (CJPOA) Section 68(1) created offences in connection with trespass by hunt saboteurs, including giving police officers the power to "direct trespassers on land (who are there with the common purpose of residing there for any period) to leave the land where the occupier has taken steps to ask them to do so, and either: they have damaged the land; or they have used threatening, abusive or insulting behaviour to the occupier, the occupier's family, employees or agents; or between them they have 6 or more vehicles on the land".

The Act also created the offence of aggravated trespass which was formed (in part) to give the police power over HSA members and actions: "a person commits the offence of aggravated trespass if he trespasses on land in the open air and, in relation to any lawful activity which persons are engaging in or are about to engage in on that or adjoining land in the open air, does there anything which is intended by him to have the effect: a) of intimidating those persons or any of them so as to deter them or any of them from engaging in that activity, b) of obstructing that activity, or c) of disrupting that activity".

== See also ==
- Opposition to hunting
- Ecotage
- Hunting Act 2004 (prohibited hunting with dogs)
- List of animal rights groups
