= Legislation on hunting with dogs =

Legislation on hunting with dogs is in place in many countries around the world. Legislation may regulate, or in some cases prohibit the use of dogs to hunt or flush wild animal species.

== History ==
The use of scenthounds to track prey dates back to Assyrian, Babylonian and Egyptian times and in England, hunting with Agassaei hounds was popular before the Romans. In more modern times, hunting regulation has been encouraged by the animal welfare and animal rights movements out of concern for wildlife management and to prevent cruelty.

== Germany ==
Contrary to popular belief, Germany was not the first country to have enacted national laws against animal cruelty (the British Parliament adopted the Cruel Treatment of Cattle Act 1822 111 years earlier), and the process of adopting animal welfare legislation on state and local level began decades before the Nazis took power in 1933.

In the 19th century, many aristocrats in the German Empire hunted with hounds on horseback, including Emperor Wilhelm II (r. 1888–1918). Hounds were used to pursue deer, wild boar, hares and foxes. However, in the late 1880s until the early 1900s, the nature conservation and animal protection movement in Germany started to form and began campaigning for legislation on animal welfare, including hunting. Although no national (imperial) laws were ever passed, several German states including the largest and most populous and powerful, Prussia, adopted laws on which wild animals received protected status and which could be hunted. This decentralised process of regulation resulted in a situation where hunting laws varied from state to state. During the Weimar Republic (1918–1933), more state laws and local decrees were passed, while some national laws were drafted that were never enacted. For example, the Prussian Tier- und Pflanzenschutzverordnung ('Animal and Plant Protection Act') of 16 December 1929 protected 'all wild bird species native to Europe' with the exception of designated 'huntable' species (specified in the Prussian Hunting Regulation of 15 July 1907) and 13 unprotected bird species.

The first time a national law on hunting was passed was the Reichsjagdgesetz ('Imperial Hunting Law') of 3 July 1934, during Adolf Hitler's government. This nationwide law superseded all seventeen state regulations that existed up until that point. It was closely modelled on the Weimar-era Prussian Tier- und Pflanzenschutzverordnung ('Animal and Plant Protection Act') of 16 December 1929. Hermann Göring had a passion for shooting game and was appointed both Reichsforstmeister ('Imperial Master of Forestry') and Reichsjagdmeister ('Imperial Master of Hunting').

== Republic of Ireland ==
In the Republic of Ireland, hunting with hounds is legal and there are many hound packs in the country. Fox hunting is legal as foxes are not a protected species, but hunts must be registered and take place at only certain times of the year. Lamping, the night-time hunting of rabbits with lurcher dogs and bright lights, is legal.

Hunting protected species is controlled under the Wildlife Acts 1976 to 2012. It is illegal to hunt deer with dogs. Hunting of hares with dogs is also illegal.

== United Kingdom ==
=== England and Wales ===
Hunting of wild mammals in the traditional style is banned by the Hunting Act 2004. Earlier acts, such as the Protection of Animals Act 1911, the Protection of Badgers Act 1992 and the Wild Mammals (Protection) Act 1996 contained specific exemptions for hunting activities.

=== Scotland ===
In February 2002 the Scottish Parliament voted by eighty-three to thirty-six to pass legislation to ban hunting with hounds. MSPs decided not to give compensation to those whose livelihoods or businesses might suffer as a result of the ban. The Act came into effect on 1 August 2002. An article in The Guardian on 9 September 2004 reported that of the ten Scottish hunts, nine survived the ban, using the permitted exemption allowing them to use packs of hounds to flush foxes to guns.

A number of convictions took place under the Act, two for people hunting foxes and ten for hare coursing. The only prosecution of a traditional mounted hunt led to a not guilty verdict, but to a clarification of the law, with the sheriff saying that the activity of flushing foxes to guns "will require to be accompanied by realistic and one would expect, effective arrangements for the shooting of pest species. The use of what might be termed "token guns" or what was described by the Crown as paying lip service to the legislation is not available ... as a justification for the continuation of what was referred to in the evidence before me as traditional fox hunting."

There were eleven hunts in Scotland as of February 2015. The continuation of the current law regarding fox hunting in England and Wales has been guaranteed by the Scottish National Party. The law regarding fox hunting in Scotland was made stricter in 2023, following the passage and commencement of the Hunting with Dogs (Scotland) Act 2023, which repealed and replaced the 2002 Act.

=== Northern Ireland ===
Fox hunting in Northern Ireland would have been banned had the Foster Bill become law. However, by the time of subsequent hunting legislation in the House of Commons, the Northern Ireland Assembly had been established and the hunting issue had been devolved to that body. A Hunting Bill was introduced into the Northern Ireland Assembly but rejected in December 2010.

== United States ==
In the United States federal system, the agency primarily responsible for wildlife management is the United States Fish and Wildlife Service, a division of the United States Department of the Interior, a cabinet-level division, whose director reports directly to the president. Within these federal guidelines, most hunting regulation for non-migratory species rests within wildlife or agricultural departments at the state level. With fifty different states, this lends itself to a wide variety of diversity, especially for an activity such as fox hunting. Much more common than organised fox hunting is the hunting (usually by private individuals) of raccoons (Ursus lotor) with coonhounds, and where such hunting is practised, the two are often regulated similarly due to the method (which involves tracking or active pursuit by dogs).

The red fox is protected in every state in which it is present (all except Hawaii), in contrast to its status in the UK. It is variously classified as a furbearer, small game or predator in state hunting and trapping regulations. The open and closed hunting seasons for fox (both red and gray) also vary by state. Pursuit of red fox while in possession of a firearm requires a hunting license (or in some cases a trapping license) in all states, and is generally restricted to a specific season (typically the winter months). In some states (such as Florida) it is illegal to chase fox with dogs while in possession of a firearm, although it is legal to chase them otherwise.

In some western states the coyote is an unprotected species, and there are no restrictions on the methods used in hunting them. In these areas Hunt Clubs often pursue coyote instead of fox.

== See also ==
- Animal law
- Conservation movement
- Falconry
- Fox hunting
- Hunting
- Wildlife management
