= Michael Winter (professor) =

British academic

Professor Michael Winter OBE
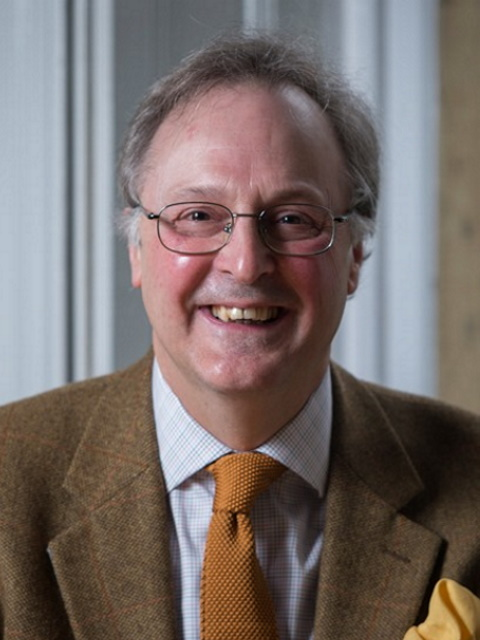
- Born: 10 November 1955 (age 70); Launceston, Cornwall, England
- Occupations: Academic, University of Exeter
- Title: OBE
- Website: www.gov.uk/government/people/michael-winter

David Michael Winter, OBE (born 10 November 1955) is an expert on rural politics and economics.

== Early life ==
He was born in Launceston, Cornwall in 1955, the son of David Winter (d.1989) a farmer and lecturer and his wife Jeanne Nanette. His early life was spent firstly in Devon, where the family farmed near Beaworthy before moving to Hampshire where his father lectured at Sparsholt College. He was educated at Peter Symonds College then at Wye College, Kent. He received a PhD from the Open University in 1988.

== Career ==
He is Director of the Centre for Rural Policy Research at the University of Exeter, UK. He is also a board member of the Commission for Rural Communities, formerly the Countryside Agency, and was formerly a member of the Governing Body of IGER (The Institute for Grassland and Environment Research). His other previous roles have included being Chair of the South West Rural Affairs Forum, a member of the Government's Inquiry into fox hunting, President of the Devon Rural Network, Vice-Chair of the Hatherleigh Area Project and Chair of Exbourne C of E Primary School Governors. In May 2008, Prof. Winter was made a Lay canon of Exeter Cathedral, Devon by Michael Langrish the Bishop of Exeter along with Dr. John Rea.

== Works ==
- Rural Politics: Policies for Agriculture, forestry and the Environment. ISBN 9780415081757
