= Lawson Soulsby, Baron Soulsby of Swaffham Prior =

British microbiologist and parasitologist

The Right Honourable The Lord Soulsby of Swaffham Prior
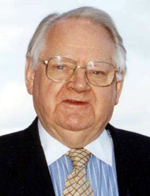
- Lord Soulsby of Swaffham Prior

Member of the House of Lords
- Lord Temporal
- Life peerage 22 May 1990 – 31 December 2015

Personal details
- Born: 23 June 1926
- Died: 8 May 2017 (aged 90)

Ernest Jackson Lawson Soulsby, Baron Soulsby of Swaffham Prior (23 June 1926 – 8 May 2017) was a British microbiologist and parasitologist. In 1990 he was made a Conservative life peer and sat in the House of Lords until his retirement in December 2015.

== Biography ==
Soulsby was brought up in the former county of Westmorland on the family farm at Williamsgill, Newbiggin, Temple Sowerby. He was educated at Queen Elizabeth Grammar School, Penrith, and then at the University of Edinburgh. Soulsby was Professor of Animal Pathology at the University of Cambridge from 1978 to 1993. He was a Fellow of Wolfson College, Cambridge from 1978.

Soulsby was a Veterinary Officer for the City of Edinburgh Council from 1949 to 1952, and then a lecturer in Clinical Parasitology at the University of Bristol from 1952 to 1954. From 1954 to 1963 Soulsby was a lecturer in Animal Pathology at the University of Cambridge. He was Professor of Parasitology at the University of Pennsylvania until 1978, when he returned to the University of Cambridge as Professor of Animal Pathology.

Before his retirement, Soulsby was also a visiting professor at various universities in Europe and the United States. He was an honorary member of numerous international parasitology societies and has been awarded numerous honorary degrees and awards. Soulsby was a member of the Council of the Royal College of Veterinary Surgeons from 1978 and was President of the Royal Society of Medicine from 1998 to 2000, past President of the Royal College of Veterinary Surgeons and was emeritus fellow of Wolfson College, Cambridge.

He was created a life peer on 22 May 1990 as Baron Soulsby of Swaffham Prior, of Swaffham Prior in the County of Cambridgeshire and was introduced in the House of Lords on 12 June 1990, where he sat as a Conservative until his retirement on 31 December 2015. He served on the Government's inquiry into fox hunting and was an expert adviser to the UK Government on animal welfare, science and technology, biotechnology and environmental issues. He was in addition the President of the Parliamentary and Scientific Committee and the President of the Royal Institute of Public Health until 2008, when it merged with the Royal Society of Health to become the Royal Society for Public Health (RSPH). He served the new body as president until the end of 2009 and was an Honorary Fellow of the RSPH.

Soulsby was also veterinary surgeon to Her Majesty Queen Elizabeth II. He published 14 books, as well as articles in various veterinary journals. In 1962, Soulsby married Annette Williams. Soulsby died on 8 May 2017 at his home in Swaffham Prior at the age of 90.

== Selected works ==
- Textbook of Veterinary Clinical Parasitology [1965]
- Biology of Parasites [1966]
- Epidemiology and Control of Nematodiasis in Cattle [1981]
