= Hunt sabotage =

Interference with hunting by activists

Hunt sabotage is the direct action that animal rights activists and animal liberation activists undertake to interfere with hunting activity.

== Description ==
Hunt sabotage, as carried out by anti-hunting campaigners, or hunt saboteurs, involves the use of a variety of tactics to prevent the killing of animals. Since the opposition to killing is generally on moral or ethical grounds, hunt sabotage takes place against both lawful and unlawful hunting activity. Tactics vary depending on the type of hunt that is being targeted.

- Fox hunting, Stag hunting or Beagling (hare hunting) often involves large packs of hounds who hunt by scent. Saboteurs use various strong smelling products, like citronella oil or aniseed, to mask the scent of the quarry animal. Other tactics include mimicking the calls of the hunt staff to pull the hounds away from the hunted animal.
- Sabotage of culls, for example badger culling or wolf culling, involves destruction of animal traps and confrontation with hunters.
- Sabotage of animal shooting involves destruction of shooting towers and hides, as well as disruption of shooting events by mass protest.
- Sabotage of killing done for pest control involves destruction of snares and traps.
- Hunt sabotage also involves infiltration by saboteurs into hunting groups. For example, the work of saboteur Mike Huskisson documenting various British hunts revealed a number of practices which were previously unknown to the general public and helped to turn opinion against hunting. Infiltration by saboteurs into meetings of the Masters of Foxhounds Association revealed tactics used by the associations members to evade anti-hunting laws in the UK, leading to the banning of various hunts by large land owners such as Natural Resources Wales and National Trust.
- Both direct action saboteurs and non-interventionists like the League Against Cruel Sports use video, photography and witness statements to support prosecution of hunters who commit offenses or to raise awareness of issues they consider show hunting as cruel, ineffective or in a bad light.

== Conflicts between hunt saboteurs and hunt supporters ==
The actions of saboteurs often place them in direct confrontation with hunters and hunt supporters.

- A member of the South Coast Hunt Saboteurs assaulted in Herstmonceux.
- Pytchley Hunt rider jailed for attack on hunt saboteur.
- Devon & Somerset Staghounds members attack saboteurs and smash vehicle.
- Weston and Banwell terrierman arrested for shovel attack on hunt saboteur.
- Hunt saboteurs assaulted by Cottesmore Hunt stewards.
- Blackmore and Sparkford Vale hunt supporters assault and intimidate saboteurs.
- West Midlands Hunt Saboteurs harassed and assaulted by police.
- Hunt saboteur beaten with shovel by badger baiters.

== By country ==
In the United Kingdom the direct-action saboteurs are often members of the Hunt Saboteurs Association. Other groups such as the League Against Cruel Sports also carry out anti-hunting activities, generally through non-direct means, campaigning, publicity etc.

Every year in Spain, organisations such as Equanimal or the platform Matar por matar, non are involved in the sabotage of the Copa Nacional de Caza del Zorro (Spanish: "National Fox Hunt Cup") following the hunters making noise with megaphones to scare foxes and preventing them from being killed.

In Ireland the Hunt Saboteurs Ireland, founded in 2019, aims to sabotage fox hunting and other forms of wildlife persecution such as lamping.

In Sweden, the Hunt Saboteurs Sweden take direct action against hunting in Sweden and Norway, especially wolf hunting.

== See also ==
- Hunt Saboteurs Association
- League Against Cruel Sports
