= Burns Inquiry =

Inquiry into British fox hunting

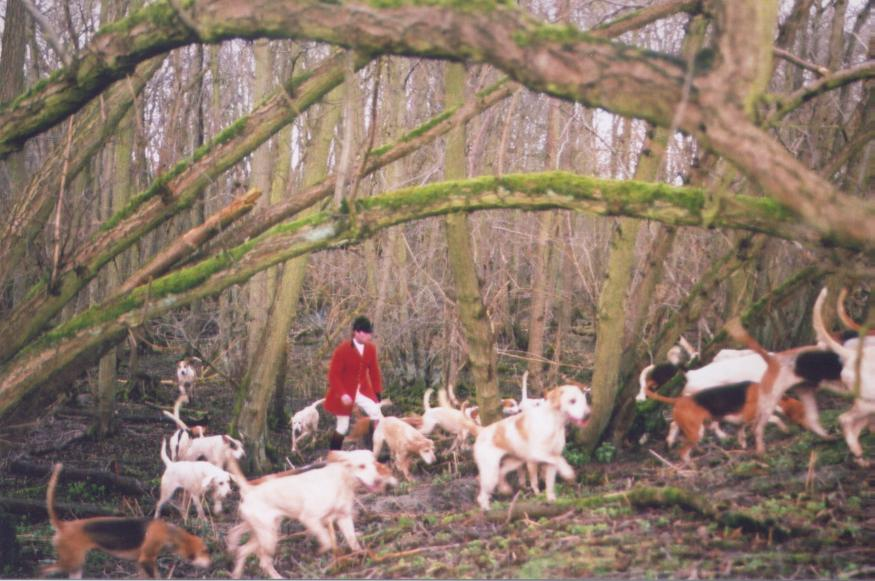
Fox hunting had long been a controversial issue in the UK.

The Burns Inquiry (or Committee of Inquiry into Hunting with Dogs in England and Wales) was a Government committee set up to examine the facts in the debate in the United Kingdom about hunting with hounds.

== Establishment ==
In December 1999, the then Home Secretary, Rt. Hon. Jack Straw MP, announced the establishment of a Government inquiry into hunting with dogs, to be chaired by the retired senior civil servant Lord Burns. Its terms of reference were:

"To inquire into:
- the practical aspects of different types of hunting with dogs and its impact on the rural economy, agriculture and pest control, the social and cultural life of the countryside, the management and conservation of wildlife, and animal welfare in particular areas of England and Wales;
- the consequences for these issues of any ban on hunting with dogs; and
- how any ban might be implemented.
To report the findings to the Secretary of State for the Home Department"

The committee commissioned a range of scientific research, undertook a series of visits to hunting events and held a number of evidence hearings. The committee did not seek "to address the ethical aspects of the subject".

== Membership ==
Following consultation with Lord Burns, Jack Straw MP appointed the following to membership of the committee:

- Lord Burns
- Dr Victoria Edwards OBE
- Professor Sir John Marsh
- Lord Soulsby of Swaffham Prior
- Professor Michael Winter

The League Against Cruel Sports criticised the appointment of several members with backgrounds related to hunting.

== Conclusions ==
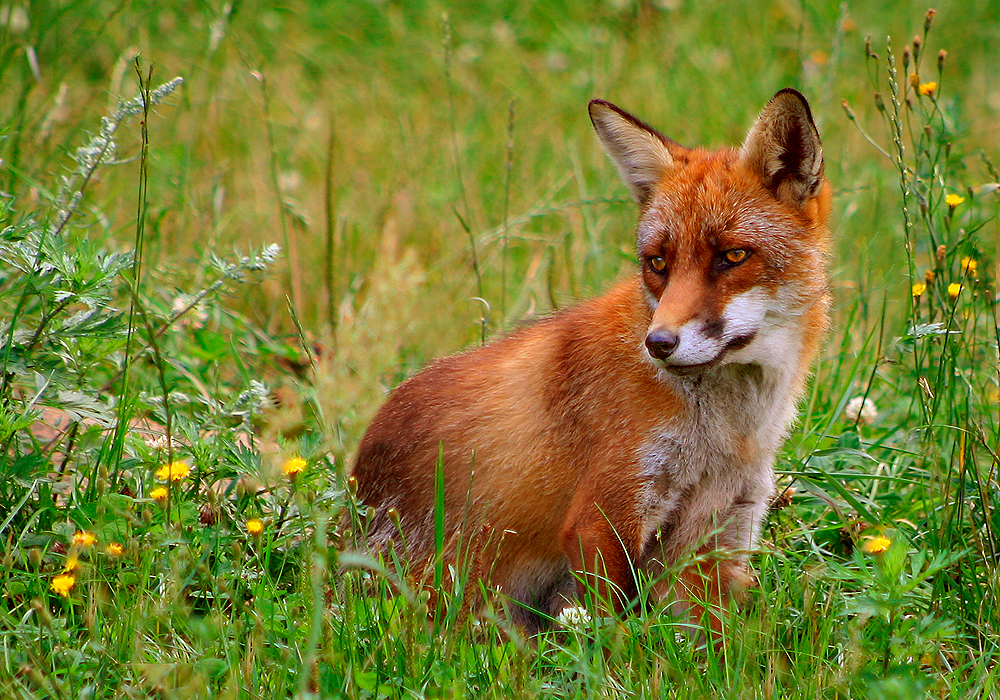
The inquiry found that foxes suffer during hunting.

The committee's most reported conclusion was that hunting with dogs "seriously compromises" the welfare of the quarry species. In line with its remit, the committee did not, however, draw any conclusion on whether hunting should be banned or should continue. In a later debate in the House of Lords, the inquiry chairman, Lord Burns, also stated that "Naturally, people ask whether we were implying that hunting is cruel... The short answer to that question is no. There was not sufficient verifiable evidence or data safely to reach views about cruelty. It is a complex area."

In a highly controversial subject area, the Burns Inquiry report was welcomed by both hunters and anti-hunting campaigners.

== Consequences ==
Following the publication of the Burns Inquiry report, the Government introduced an "options bill" which allowed each House of Parliament to choose between a ban, licensed hunting, and self-regulation. The House of Commons voted for a banning Bill and the House of Lords for self-regulation. After further inquiries, the Government introduced a further Bill, which was amended to become the Hunting Act 2004.

== See also ==
- Beagling
- Deer hunting
- Hare coursing
- Animal welfare in the United Kingdom
