= Hunt monitor =

Hunt observers in the United Kingdom

In the United Kingdom, hunt monitors endeavour to observe behaviours of organized hunts and undertake information gathering activities, known as hunt monitoring.

Hunt monitoring is an activity undertaken by concerned individuals who want to see the UK Parliament’s Hunting Act upheld.

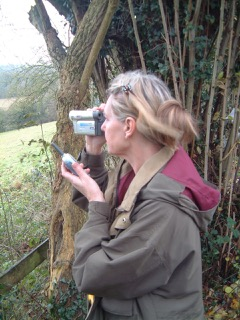
A hunt monitor observes a hunt in England

Hunt monitoring activities are undertaken mainly by private individuals who wish to see The Hunting Act 2004, passed by The U.K. Parliament, upheld by The U.K. Courts. Hunt monitoring is also carried out by a number of animal welfare organizations in The U.K.. The prime aim of hunt monitors is to facilitate successful prosecution of those who do not hunt within the laws of The U.K., through gathering evidence of illegal hunting.

The Hunting Act 2004 became law, in England and Wales, in February 2005. It bans hunting with dogs of particular wild mammals, namely: foxes, deer, hare and mink. The ban was achieved through efforts of many campaigners, over almost a century. In recent years, evidence gathering by hunt monitors became central to the long campaign to ban hunting with hounds, as hunt monitors began to use portable video cameras to record hunting activity. Recorded evidence of hunting with dogs, collected by hunt monitors, was shown in the media and to Members of Parliament, and contributed to evidence used to support passage of The Hunting Bill through Parliament.

Before the hunting with dogs ban came into force, it was reported that an estimated 50,000 hunt supporters had signed a "Hunting Declaration", pledging that they would break any such anti-hunting law, should it be put onto The Statute Book. Local newspapers were invited to hunting rallies, in order to publicize signings of "Hunting Declarations".

Since The Hunting Act became law, in contrast to tackling illegal hare coursing fairly consistently, the police and The Crown Prosecution Services appear to have been reluctant to act against organized hunts. Nevertheless, numerous members of organized hunts have been taken to court. A significant number of members, as well as an organized hunt, acting as a corporate body, have been convicted of hunting illegally.

The work of hunt monitors has been recognized by Ann Widdecombe, a former Conservative Minister and MP.

In January 2011, The Huntsman and a Terrierman of The Fernie Hunt were found guilty of digging a fox out of a sett and, in May 2012, three members of The Crawley and Horsham Hunt were found guilty of illegal hunting.

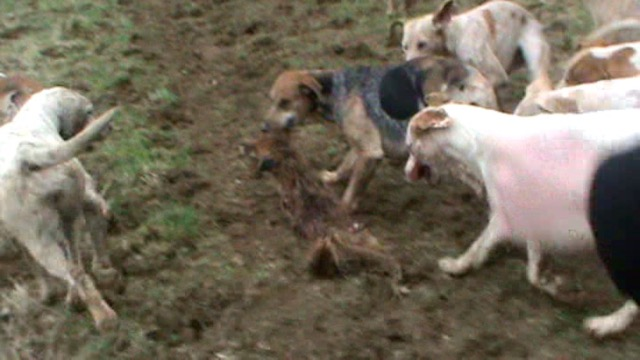
Heythrop Hunt hounds maul a fox on 29 February 2012

In August 2012, two members of The Meynell and South Staffordshire Hunt were found guilty of illegal hunting. The Hunt Master and a Terrierman were each convicted at Derby Magistrates' Court.

In December 2012, The Royal Society for the Prevention of Cruelty to Animals (RSPCA) took out a private prosecution, using evidence collected by several, independent hunt monitors, against Heythrop Hunt Limited. This was a landmark case, as it was the first time that an organized hunt was prosecuted as a corporate body. The Heythrop Hunt, its Huntsman and its Senior Master all pleaded guilty to four charges of illegally hunting a fox.

Hunt monitors have been subjected to threats, assault, damage to their cars, cameras and radios, as well as verbal abuse, obstruction and intimidation.

On 13 February 2013, Chris Williamson, MP led a debate in The House of Commons, entitled Policing of Violence at Hunts, to highlight, as he put it "... the antisocial and criminal behaviour ..." directed towards hunt monitors by some hunt supporters.

While some hunt monitors are employed by organizations and charities, such as The League Against Cruel Sports and International Fund for Animal Welfare, most are private individuals, who are unpaid and self-funded. Some hunt monitors accept donations to support their activities, made through social media sites, such as GoFundMe and Facebook.
