= Timothy Lawson-Cruttenden =

British solicitor (1955–2019)

Arthur Timothy Lawson-Cruttenden (23 January 1955 – 17 April 2019) was a British solicitor. He specialised in court-martial law, and using the Protection from Harassment Act 1997 to contain and curtail protest involving, amongst other matters, anti-corporate groups. He acted in numerous cases involving animal rights groups, environmentalists, and anti-militarist groups.

Timothy ("Tim") Lawson-Cruttenden was born in Hendon (North London). His father, most commonly known as Roy Cruttenden (1925–2019), was an Olympic long jumper. His mother, born Phyllis May Watkins, was a PE teacher. Tim Lawson-Cruttenden attended Harrow School and Sidney Sussex College, Cambridge. He was a British Army Lieutenant in the Blues and Royals and an honorary legal advisor to the Regiment.

He was the secretary of the Old Harrovian Law Society and was one of the founding members of the Solicitors’ Association of Higher Court Advocates and its chairman from 2007.

He died while swimming off the coast of Gibraltar in 2019. An obituary appeared in The Times.

== Books ==
- Timothy Lawson-Cruttenden and Neil Addison (1997), Blackstone's Guide to the Protection from Harassment Act 1997, Blackstone Press, ISBN 978-1-85431-695-0
- Neil Addison and Timothy Lawson-Cruttenden (1997), Harassment Law & Practice
