= Masters of Foxhounds Association of North America =

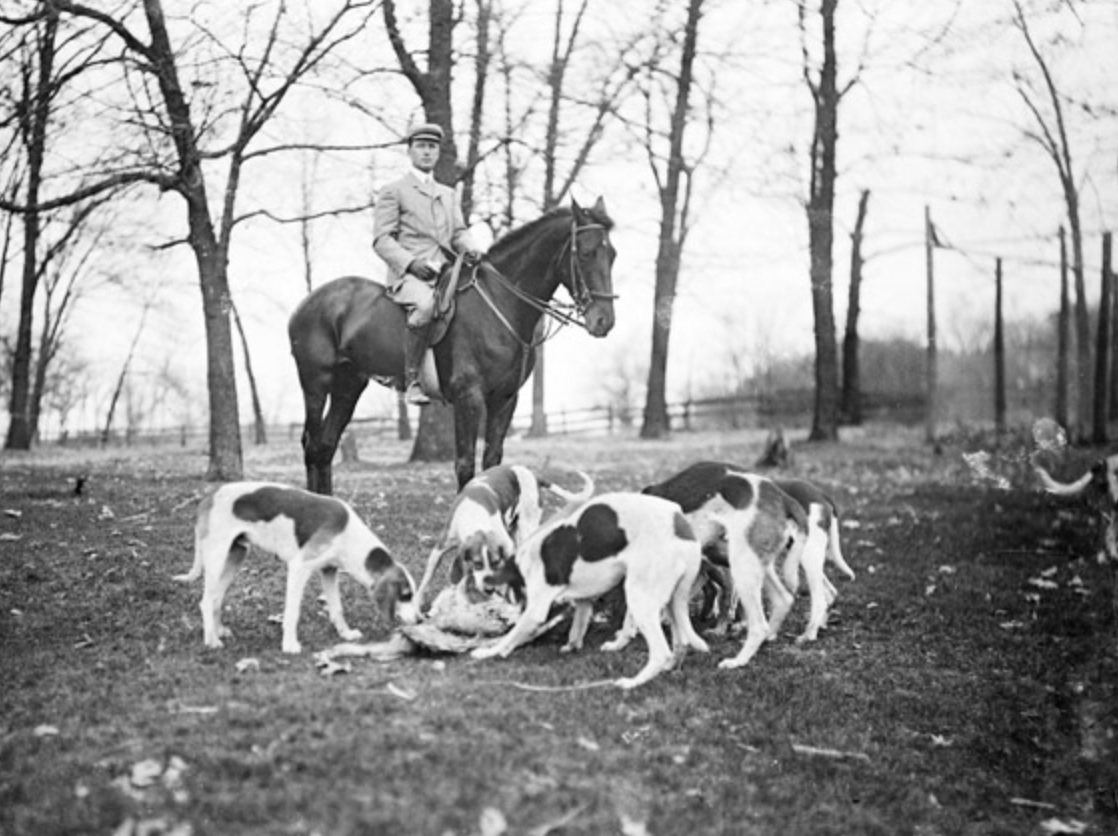
Foxhounds at Midlothian Country Club

The Masters of Foxhounds Association of North America, first established in 1907 as the Masters of Foxhounds Association of America, and commonly abbreviated to MFHA, is an association promoting the activities and interests of fox hunting in the United States and Canada. It has its headquarters in Middleburg, Virginia.

The MFHA is the governing body of fox, coyote, and drag hunts in both the United States and Canada.

As well as organizing fox hound shows and performance trials, the MFHA operates a Professional Development Program and a Hunt Staff Benefit Foundation. It also publishes a number of guides and handbooks, several of which are available on its web site.

Members of the MFHA include the Montreal Hunt, the oldest fox hunt in Canada, formed in 1826, and the Piedmont Foxhounds of Virginia, first established in 1840.

== Publications ==
- Forming a Hunt: Considerations and Structure (MFHA, 2003)
- MFHA Constitution & By-Laws (MFHA, 2010)
- Lt. Col. Dennis J. Foster, Introduction to Foxhunting (4th edition, MFHA, 2013)
- Performance Trial Rules and Regulations (MFHA, 2013)
- A Guide for Hound Shows, Puppy Shows & Performance Trials (MFHA, 2013)
- A Guide to Kennel Standards of Care Checklist (MFHA laminated poster, 2013)
- Lt. Col. Dennis J. Foster, A Guide to Being a Master of Foxhounds (MFHA, 2015)
- Code of Hunting Practices (MFHA, 2015)
- Mrs William G. Fendley III, A Guide to Establishing a Foxhunting Camp (MFHA, 2015)
- Foxhound Kennel Notebook (5th edition, MFHA, 2015)
- MFHA Guidebook & Rules (MFHA, 2015)
- MFHA Territory Policy (2015)
