= Opposition to hunting =

Movement against hunting

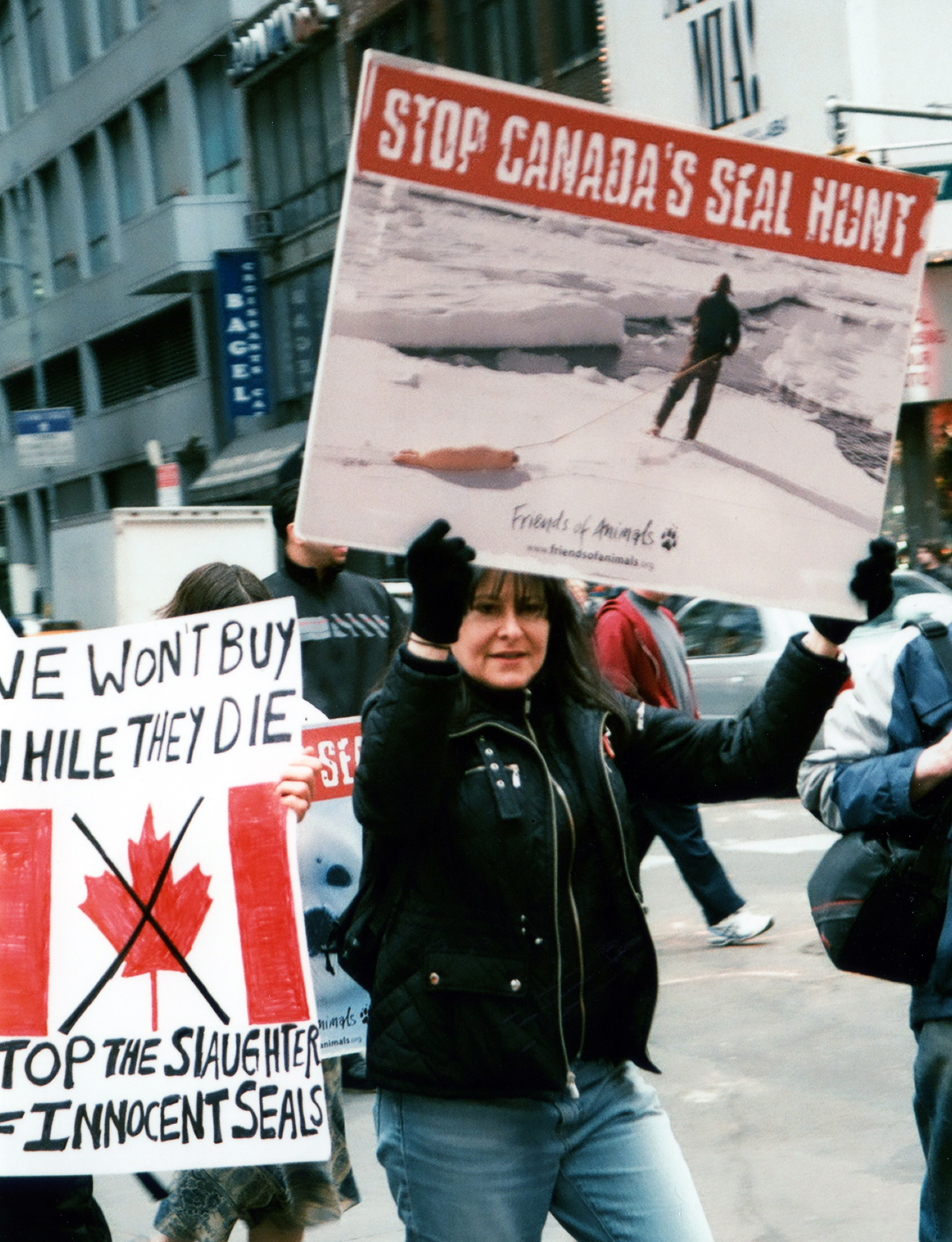
Anti-hunting protest, New York City

Opposition to hunting is espoused by people or groups who object to the practice of hunting, often seeking anti-hunting legislation and sometimes taking on acts of civil disobedience, such as hunt sabotage. Anti-hunting laws, such as the English Hunting Act 2004, are generally distinguishable from conservation legislation like the American Marine Mammal Protection Act by whether they seek to reduce or prevent hunting for perceived cruelty-related reasons or to regulate hunting for conservation, although the boundaries of distinction are sometimes blurred in specific laws, for example when endangered animals are hunted.

Animal rights activists argue that hunting for sport is cruel, unnecessary, and unethical. The term anti-hunting is used to describe opponents of hunting; while it does not appear to be pejorative, it is widely used as such by pro-hunting people.

== Geographic differences ==
It is difficult to compare strength of anti-hunting sentiment in different countries, for example because the word hunting carries different meanings in the UK and United States. Nonetheless, it is more possible to compare the strength of the anti-hunting movement in different countries, with some having stronger organization, such as in the UK, and some being nearly without it, such as New Zealand. Opinions can vary widely on different surveys even within the same country, and as in all market research, consideration must be given to recent events that made the news and the wording of the questions, both of which can influence results.

== Roots of the movement ==
The Burns Inquiry analysis of the opposition to hunting in the UK included social class, sometimes proposed as a differentiating factor between hunting in the UK and hunting in the United States, as one among many anti-hunting concerns. Furthermore, they showed the UK's anti-hunting movement was itself only part of a wider, grassroots opposition to hunting in the UK. The Burns Inquiry reported:

There are those who have a moral objection to hunting and who are fundamentally opposed to the idea of people gaining pleasure from what they regard as the causing of unnecessary suffering. There are also those who perceive hunting as representing a divisive social class system. Others, as we note below, resent the hunt trespassing on their land, especially when they have been told they are not welcome. They worry about the welfare of the pets and animals and the difficulty of moving around the roads where they live on hunt days. Finally there are those who are concerned about damage to the countryside and other animals, particularly badgers and otters.

Opposition to hunting is not new. Victorian era dramatist W. S. Gilbert remarked, "Deer-stalking would be a very fine sport if only the deer had guns."

The UK government's response to the call for bans on hunting, notably rabbit and hare coursing, has historically been to show its support for the interests of farmers, according to political historian Michael Tichelar. As recently as 2005, one anti-hare coursing organisation referred to coursing supporters as being made up of "10% Nobs and 90% Yobs".

An element of class is absent from the hunting debate in the United States where there are not many obvious class differences in hunting habits. Instead the differences in anti-hunting sentiment relates to urban sprawl and increasing population density. Because of the abundance of public land in the United States, as high as 75% of the land in some states, one need not be wealthy to have access to huntable land in less densely populated areas.

The democratic perspective on hunting in the United States started as a result of the reaction against English laws restricting game to the crown. This is one of the aspects of American culture which formed as a result of that nation's original high number of enclosure refugees from the UK and Ireland. A further distinction between the context of debate on hunting in the UK and US is that US hunting is generally licensed by government agencies, providing licence fee revenue. In contrast to this, hunting in the UK has broadly required only the permission of the landowner or the owner of sporting rights over the land.

== Measures to protect animals ==
Some organizations advocate protecting animals from hunters by spreading deer repellent or human hair (from barber shops) near hunting areas.

== Anti-hunting organizations ==
There are various organizations advocating for anti-hunting legislation and protection of wildlife. These include organizations such as PETA, Humane Society of the United States (HSUS), Center for Biological Diversity, Defenders of Wildlife, etc. Though all of them are generally supporting the same idea, they achieve their goal in different ways. PETA, for instance, one of the most prominent organizations of this sort, primarily endorses the idea that we are not allowed to hunt down, exploit or utilize animals for any purposes, whether it is to eat them, wear them or abuse them for entertainment, and that humans as a species are not superior to animals and do not own them. PETA uses various methods of spreading their message and targeting specific audiences such as policymakers or businesses that use animals in their production.

Organizations such as HSUS may also help the endangered animals around the globe directly. For example, "Black Beauty Ranch", which was founded in 1979 by the HSUS is a sanctuary for endangered exotic animals. The animals living there were saved from various sites around the world where they were being exploited, experimented on or jeopardized in other ways. The HSUS is also working with the US government and policymakers to ban activities such as trophy hunting and cosmetic animal testing. Some organizations such as Center for Biological Diversity go as far as to launch a lawsuit to ban damaging hunting practices which jeopardize endangered wildlife.

== Opinion polls ==
Country	Polling firm	Question	Date of polling	Source	Pro hunting	Anti hunting	Don't know/ no opinion
United Kingdom	MORI for League Against Cruel Sports (n=2,032)	Do you think fox hunting should be made legal again?	5–11 September 2008		16	75	9
United Kingdom	MORI for BBC (n=2,234)	To what extent do you support or oppose a ban on hunting with dogs?	Feb 2005		26%	47%	27%
United Kingdom	MORI for RSPCA / IFAW (n=1,983)	Do you support the ban [on hunting with dogs] staying in place / being scrapped?	2–8 February 2007		17	58	24
United States	Responsive Management	Do you approve or disapprove of legal hunting?	September 2006		78	16	6
Northern Ireland	Millward Brown	Is fox hunting cruel?	20–27 March 2006		11	79	10
United States	Responsive Management	Do you approve or disapprove of legal hunting?	1995		73	22	5

In both 2004 and 2014, voters in Maine, US, rejected a proposed ban on the use of dogs, bait, and traps while hunting black bears. Polls preceding the 2014 vote had predicted the measure would be rejected.

== See also ==
- Animal welfare - Opposition to fishing, Opposition to farming
- Bambi effect
- Class struggle
- Conservation biology
- Hunting law
- Speciesism
- Hunt Saboteurs Association
- List of animal rights groups
