= Terence Burns, Baron Burns =

British economist

The Right Honourable The Lord Burns GCB
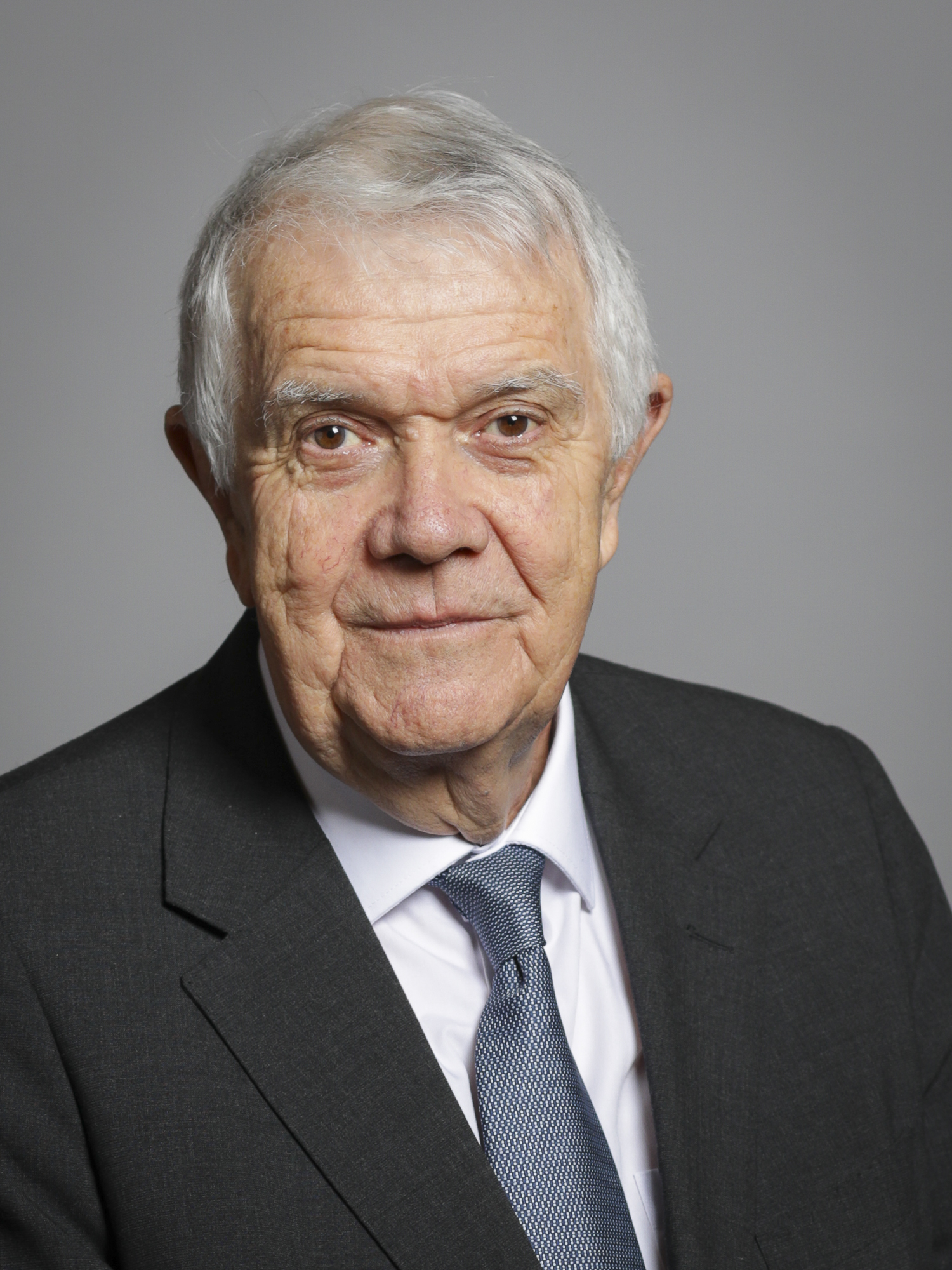
- Burns in 2019

Chairman of the Office of Communications
- In office 1 January 2018 – 31 December 2020
- Prime Minister: Theresa May; Boris Johnson
- Culture Sec.: Karen Bradley; Matt Hancock; Jeremy Wright; The Baroness Morgan of Cotes; Oliver Dowden
- Preceded by: Dame Patricia Hodgson
- Succeeded by: Maggie Carver (Interim)

Chairman of Channel Four Television Corporation
- In office January 2010 – January 2016
- Preceded by: Luke Johnson
- Succeeded by: Charles Gurassa

Permanent Secretary to the Treasury
- In office 1991–1998
- Preceded by: Peter Middleton
- Succeeded by: Andrew Turnbull

President of National Institute of Economic and Social Research
- In office 2003–2010
- Succeeded by: Sir Nicholas Monck

Member of the House of Lords
- Lord Temporal
- Life peerage 20 July 1998

Personal details
- Born: 13 March 1944 (age 82) Hetton-le-Hole, Durham
- Party: Crossbench
- Spouse: Anne Elizabeth Powell (m. 1969)
- Children: 3
- Occupation: Civil Servant, Businessman
- Known for: Civil Service (UK), HM Treasury, Channel 4, Ofcom

Terence Burns, Baron Burns GCB (born 13 March 1944), sometimes known as Terry Burns, is a British economist. He was made a life peer in 1998 after serving as Chief Economic Advisor and Permanent Secretary to HM Treasury. He served as Chairman of Ofcom from 2018 to 2020, and is currently a senior adviser to Santander UK, a non-executive Chairman of Glas Cymru, and a non-executive director of Pearson Group plc. He is also a former President of the National Institute of Economic and Social Research, President of the Society of Business Economists, ex Chairman of the Governing Body of the Royal Academy of Music, and ex Chairman of the Monteverdi Choir and Orchestra. On 5 November 2009 he was announced chairman Designate of Channel Four Television Corporation, succeeding Luke Johnson, who retired on 27 January 2010 following six years in the post.

== Government career ==
His government service began as a member of the HM Treasury Academic Panel from 1976 to 1979, then as Chief Economic Adviser to the Treasury and Head of the Government Economic Service from 1980 to 1991, and as Permanent Secretary of HM Treasury from 1991 to 1998.

Lord Burns was a member of the Hansard Society Commission on Parliamentary Scrutiny which ran from 1999 to 2001. He was a member of the Scottish Fee Support Review from 1998 to 2000, and Chairman of the Committee of Inquiry into Hunting with Dogs in England and Wales in 2000. He was Chairman of the National Lottery Commission between 2000 and 2001. In 2003, he was appointed Independent Adviser to the Secretary of State for the BBC Charter Review.

== Business career ==
Lord Burns was appointed a non-executive director of Pearson plc in 1999, and Senior Independent Director in 2004. He was also a non-executive director of Legal and General Group plc between 1999 and 2001, and of The British Land Company plc between 2000 and 2005. In July 2000, he was appointed Non-Executive Chairman of Glas Cymru. He was named Chairman of Abbey National plc in February 2002, and a non-executive director of Banco Santander Central Hispano S.A. in December 2004. He became Chairman of Marks and Spencer plc in 2006, after serving as Deputy chairman since 2005. Lord Burns was appointed as Chairman of Ofcom for a four-year term from 1 January 2018.

== Professional ==
Lord Burns has been President of the Society of Business Economists since 1998, previously serving as Vice-President since 1985. He has been President of the National Institute of Economic and Social Research since 2003, previously serving as a Governor. He is also a Fellow of the London Business School, and a Vice-President of the Royal Economic Society.

== Other positions held ==
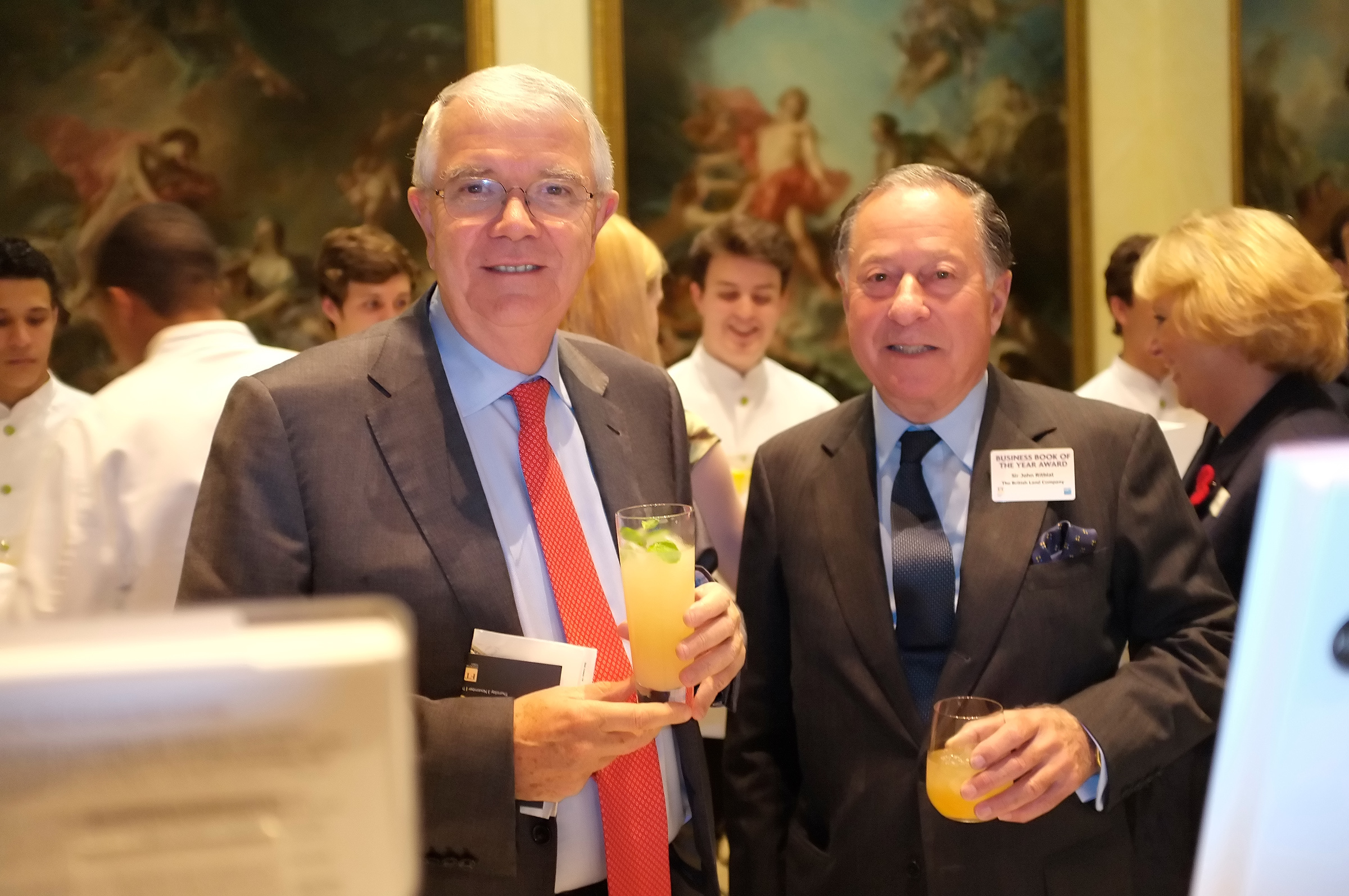
Lord Burns and Sir John Ritblat

Lord Burns chaired the Government Inquiry into Hunting with Dogs in England and Wales in 1999–2000, was named Chairman of the Monteverdi Choir and Orchestra in 2001 after serving as a Trustee since 1998 and was appointed Chairman of the Governing Body of the Royal Academy of Music in 2002 after being a Governor since 1998.

He was a non-executive director of Queens Park Rangers FC between 1996 and 2001. In 2004, he was appointed Chairman of the FA Structural Review by The Football Association, and delivered his Final Report on 12 August 2005.

== Personal life ==
The son of Patrick Owen Burns, a coalminer, and Doris Burns, he was born and brought up in the village of Hetton-le-Hole in County Durham, and educated at Houghton-le-Spring Grammar School and the University of Manchester, where he graduated with a Bachelor of Arts degree in economics in 1965. He has been married to Anne Elizabeth Powell since 1969. They have a son, two daughters and four grandchildren.

== Honours ==
He was knighted in the 1983 Birthday Honours, and was appointed to the Order of the Bath as a Knight Grand Cross (GCB) in the 1995 Birthday Honours. In the 1998 Birthday Honours, he was raised to the peerage as Baron Burns, of Pitshanger in the London Borough of Ealing. He sits as a crossbencher.

He received honorary doctorates from the University of Manchester in 1992, the University of Sunderland in 1993, Durham University in 1996 and the University of Sheffield in 1999.

== Works ==
- Britton, A., Randolph Quirk, Terence Burns, Peter Mathias, John Mason, The Interpretation and Use of Economic Predictions: Discussion, Proceedings of the Royal Society of London. Series A, Mathematical and Physical Sciences, Volume 407, Issue 1832, (1986), 1986RSPSA.407..123B
- The UK Government's Financial Strategy (1988)

Media offices
Preceded by Luke Johnson	Chairman of Channel 4 January 2010 – January 2016	Succeeded by Charles Gurassa
Orders of precedence in the United Kingdom
Preceded by The Lord Alli	Gentlemen; Baron Burns	Followed by The Lord Lamont of Lerwick
