= Victim surcharge =

Penalty to compensate victims of crime

In the legal system of England and Wales, the surcharge, often referred to as a victim surcharge, is a penalty applied to people convicted of offences, in addition to a conditional discharge, a fine, or a community or custodial sentence, in order to provide compensation for the victims of crime.

The surcharge is not paid directly to the criminal's victim, but is pooled and distributed through the Victim and Witness General Fund. The amount to be paid is specified by law, and courts have limited discretion to reduce the amount, or even to waive the surcharge, for defendants of limited means. The law journalist Joshua Rozenberg has reported cases where a surcharge levied against a young person became the responsibility of their parents, even when a parent was the victim of the crime in question.

In some circumstances, the court may waive the victim surcharge where the court orders compensation as part of the sentence. Additionally, the surcharge is not payable where the court is dealing with breach of a community order or breach of a suspended sentence or breach of a conditional discharge.

The surcharge was first introduced in 2007. From 1 September 2014, the discretion of magistrates' courts to apply additional custody days in lieu of the surcharge was withdrawn.

== Amounts ==
For offences committed after 16 June 2022, the amount of the surcharge, depending on the penalty awarded, is:

Conditional discharge
£26
Fine
40% of the fine value (£2,000 maximum)
Community sentence
£114
Custodial sentence of 6 months and below
£154
Custodial sentence, 6 months to 2 years
£187
Custodial sentence over 2 years
£228 (only in Crown Court)

Other figures apply for legal persons who are not individuals; and offenders aged under 18.

Official figures show that £51 million was raised between 2010 and 2014. That figure has increased significantly, as £74 million was raised in the 2024-25 financial year alone (out of the £106 million imposed).

== In other countries ==
In Canada, the Federal Victim Surcharge was made mandatory by the Increasing Offenders' Accountability for Victims Act in 2013. A number of Charter challenges have been made, where it was applied to offenders who would not be able to pay.
