= List of foxhound packs of the United Kingdom =

The following is a list of foxhound packs in the United Kingdom, which are recognised by the Masters of Foxhounds Association. Fox hunting is prohibited in Great Britain by the Protection of Wild Mammals (Scotland) Act 2002 and the Hunting Act 2004 (England and Wales), but remains legal in Northern Ireland. Since the inception of the ban, most registered hunts in Great Britain have switched to trail hunting as a legal alternative.

== England ==
Traditional-style fox hunting with hounds in England is prohibited, with some exemptions, under the Hunting Act 2004.

=== South West England ===
- Avon Vale Foxhounds
- Axe Vale Hunt
- Berkeley Hunt
- Blackmore and Sparkford Vale Hunt
- Cattistock Hunt
- Cotley Hunt
- Cotswold Hunt
- Cotswold Vale Farmers Foxhounds
- Croome and West Warwickshire Foxhounds
- Cury Hunt
- Dartmoor Hunt
- Duke of Beaufort's Hunt
- Dulverton Farmers Hunt (formerly the Dulverton East Foxhounds)
- Dulverton West Foxhounds
- East Cornwall Hunt
- East Devon Hunt
- Eggesford Foxhounds
- Exmoor Foxhounds
- Four Burrow Hunt
- Lamerton Hunt
- Ledbury Hunt
- Mendip Farmers Hunt
- Mid Devon Foxhounds
- North Cotswold Hunt
- Portman Hunt
- Royal Artillery Hunt
- Seavington Hunt
- Silverton Foxhounds
- South and West Wilts Hunt
- South Devon Hunt
- South Dorset Hunt
- South Tetcott Hunt
- Spooners and West Dartmoor Hunt
- Stevenstone Hunt
- Taunton Vale Foxhounds
- Tedworth Hunt
- Tetcott Hunt
- Tiverton Foxhounds
- Torrington Farmers Hunt
- Vale of White Horse Hunt
- West Somerset Foxhounds
- West Somerset Vale Hunt
- Western Hunt
- Wilton Hunt

=== South East England ===
- Ashford Valley Tickham Hunt
- Bicester with Whaddon Chase Hunt
- Chiddingfold, Leconfield and Cowdray Hunt
- Crawley and Horsham Hunt
- East Kent Foxhounds
- East Kent with West Street Hunt
- East Sussex and Romney Marsh Foxhounds
- Hampshire Hunt (HH)
- Heythrop Hunt
- Hursley Hambledon Hunt
- Isle of Wight Foxhounds
- Kimblewick Hunt
- New Forest Hounds
- North Cornwall Foxhounds
- Old Berkshire Hunt
- Old Surrey Burstow and West Kent Hunt
- Southdown and Eridge Hunt
- Surrey Union Hunt
- Vine and Craven Hunt

=== East of England ===
- Cambridgeshire Hunt with Enfield Chace
- East Essex Hunt
- Essex and Suffolk Hunt
- Essex Farmers and Union Hunt
- Essex Hunt
- Fitzwilliam (Milton) Hunt
- Puckeridge Hunt
- Suffolk Hunt
- Thurlow Hunt
- West Norfolk Foxhounds

=== West Midlands ===
- Albrighton and Woodland Hunt
- Atherstone Hunt
- Clifton-on-Teme Hunt
- Ludlow Hunt
- Moorlands Hunt
- North Herefordshire Hunt
- North Ledbury Hunt
- North Shropshire Hunt
- North Staffordshire Hunt
- Radnor and West Hereford Hunt
- Sir Watkin Williams-Wynns Hunt (the Wynnstay)
- South Herefordshire Hunt
- South Shropshire Hunt
- United Pack
- Warwickshire Hunt
- Wheatland Hunt
- Worcestershire Hunt

=== East Midlands ===
- Barlow Hunt
- Belvoir Hunt
- Blankney Hunt
- Brocklesby Foxhounds
- Burton Hunt
- Cottesmore Hunt
- Fernie Hunt
- Grafton Hunt
- Grove and Rufford Hunt
- Meynell and South Staffordshire Hunt
- Oakley Hunt
- Pytchley Hunt
- Quorn Hunt
- South Notts Hunt
- South Wold Hunt
- Woodland Pytchley Hunt

=== North West England ===
- Bewcastle Hunt
- Blencathra Foxhounds
- Cheshire Forest Hunt
- Cheshire Hunt
- Coniston Foxhounds
- Cumberland Farmers Hunt
- Cumberland Foxhounds
- Eskdale and Ennerdale Foxhounds
- Lunesdale Foxhounds
- Melbeak Foxhounds
- North Lonsdale Foxhounds
- Pennine Foxhounds
- Ullswater Foxhounds

=== North East England ===
- Border Hunt
- Braes of Derwent Hunt
- College Valley and North Northumberland Hunt
- Haydon Hunt
- Morpeth Hunt
- North Pennine Hunt
- North Tyne Hunt
- Percy Hunt
- South Durham Hunt
- Tynedale Hunt
- West Percy Hunt

=== Yorkshire and the Humber ===
- Badsworth and Bramham Moor Foxhounds
- Bedale Hunt
- Bilsdale Hunt
- Cleveland Hunt
- Derwent Hunt
- Farndale Hunt (disbanded)
- Glaisdale Foxhounds
- Goathland and Glaisdale Hunt
- Goathland Foxhounds
- Holderness Hunt
- Hurworth Hunt
- Middleton Hunt
- Saltersgate Farmers Hunt
- Sinnington Hunt
- Staintondale Hunt
- Wensleydale Foxhounds
- West of Yore Hunt
- York north and west of yore hunt
- York and Ainsty South Hunt
- Zetland Hunt

== Wales ==
Fox hunting with hounds in Wales is prohibited, with some exemptions, under the Hunting Act 2004.

- Aber Valley Foxhounds
- Banwen Miners Hunt
- Brecon and Talybont Hunt
- Caerphilly & District Hunt
- Carmarthenshire Hunt
- Curre and Llangibby Hunt
- Cwrt Y Cadno Farmers Foxhounds
- David Davies Hunt
- Dwyryd Hunt
- Eryri (cwn Hela Eryi) Foxhounds
- Flint and Denbigh Hunt
- Gelligaer Farmers Hunt
- Glamorgan Hunt
- Gogerddan Hunt
- Golden Valley Hunt
- Gwendraeth Valley Hunt
- Irfon and Towy Hunt
- Llandeilo Farmers Hunt
- Llangeinor Pentyrch Foxhounds
- Llanwnnen Farmers Hunt
- Llanwrthwl Hunt
- Monmouthshire Hunt
- Nantcol Valley Foxhounds
- Pembrokeshire Hunt
- Pentyrch Hunt Club
- Sennybridge Farmers Hunt
- Cresselly Hunt
- Tanatside Hunt
- Teme Valley Hunt
- Tivyside Hunt
- Towy & Cothi Hunt
- Tredegar Farmers Hunt
- Vale of Clettwr Hunt
- Ystrad Taf Fechan Hunt

== Scotland ==
Traditional-style fox hunting in Scotland is prohibited under the Protection of Wild Mammals (Scotland) Act 2002.

- Berwickshire Foxhounds
- Duke of Buccleuch's Hunt
- Dumfriesshire and Stewartry Foxhounds
- Eglinton Hunt (disbanded in 2008 following suspension.)
- Fife Foxhounds (re-formed as Fife Bloodhounds in February 2023.)
- Jed Forest Foxhounds
- Kincardineshire Foxhounds
- Lanarkshire and Renfrewshire Foxhounds (Shut down in March 2023.)
- Lauderdale Foxhounds
- Liddesdale Foxhounds
- Strathappin Hunt

== Northern Ireland ==
Northern Ireland is the only part of the UK where traditional fox hunting is legal.

- Dungannon Foxhounds
- East Down Hunt
- Iveagh Hunt
- Killutagh, Old Rock and Chichester Hunt
- North Down Hunt
- South Tyrone Hunt

== See also ==
- Fox hunting
- Trail hunting
- Drag hunting
- Clean boot hunting
- Protection of Wild Mammals (Scotland) Act 2002
- Hunting Act 2004
