= List of LNER Class D49 locomotives =

Below are the names and numbers of the steam locomotives that comprised the LNER Class D49, that ran on the London and North Eastern Railway network. The class names came from English and Scottish counties for the early locomotives, and fox hunts for the later locomotives.

Most names were local to the areas of Scotland and the North of England where the locomotives were based, but some were out of area, while a few were nowhere near the LNER network.

Fleet list
LNER No.	1946 No.	BR No.	Original name (Rename)	Class Part	Date built	Date withdrawn	Notes
234	2700	62700	Yorkshire	1	October 1927	October 1958	
251	2701	62701	Derbyshire	1	November 1927	September 1959	
253	2702	62702	Oxfordshire	1	November 1927	November 1958	
256	2703	62703	Hertfordshire	1	December 1927	June 1958	
264	2704	62704	Stirlingshire	1	December 1927	August 1958	
265	2705	62705	Lanarkshire	1	December 1927	November 1959	
266	2706	62706	Forfarshire	1	December 1927	February 1958	
236	2707	62707	Lancashire	1	January 1928	October 1959	
270	2708	62708	Argyllshire	1	January 1928	May 1959	
277	2709	62709	Berwickshire	1	January 1928	January 1960	
245	2710	62710	Lincolnshire	1	February 1928	October 1960	
281	2711	62711	Dumbartonshire	1	February 1928	May 1961	
246	2712	62712	Morayshire	1	February 1928	July 1961	Preserved on the Bo'ness and Kinneil Railway.
249	2713	62713	Aberdeenshire	1	February 1928	September 1957	
250	2714	62714	Perthshire	1	March 1928	August 1959	
306	2715	62715	Roxburghshire	1	March 1928	June 1959	
307	2716	62716	Kincardineshire	1	March 1928	April 1961	
309	2717	62717	Banffshire	1	March 1928	January 1961	
310	2718	62718	Kinross-shire	1	May 1928	April 1961	
311	2719	62719	Peebles-shire	1	May 1928	January 1960	
318	2720	62720	Cambridgeshire	3	May 1928	October 1959	Rebuilt as D49/1 in March 1938
320	2721	62721	Warwickshire	3	May 1928	August 1958	Rebuilt as D49/1 in March 1938
322	2722	62722	Huntingdonshire	3	July 1928	October 1959	Rebuilt as D49/1 in November 1938
327	2723	62723	Nottinghamshire	3	July 1928	January 1961	Rebuilt as D49/1 in June 1938
335	2724	62724	Bedfordshire	3	August 1928	December 1957	Rebuilt as D49/1 in November 1938
329	2725	62725	Inverness-shire	3	August 1928	November 1958	Rebuilt as D49/1 in September 1938
352	2726	62726	Leicestershire (renamed The Meynell in June 1932)	2	March 1929	December 1957	
336	2727	62727	Buckinghamshire (renamed The Quorn in May 1932)	2	June 1929	January 1961	
2753	2728	62728	Cheshire	1	February 1929	October 1959	
2754	2729	62729	Rutlandshire	1	April 1929	May 1961	
2755	2730	62730	Berkshire	1	March 1929	December 1958	
2756	2731	62731	Selkirkshire	1	March 1929	April 1959	
2757	2732	62732	Dumfries-shire	1	March 1929	November 1958	
2758	2733	62733	Northumberland	1	March 1929	April 1961	
2759	2734	62734	Cumberland	1	May 1929	March 1961	
2760	2735	62735	Westmorland	1	June 1929	August 1958	
201	2736	62736	The Bramham Moor	2	April 1932	June 1958	
211	2737	62737	The York & Ainsty	2	May 1932	January 1958	
220	2738	62738	The Zetland	2	May 1932	September 1959	
232	2739	62739	The Badsworth	2	May 1932	October 1960	
235	2740	62740	The Bedale	2	June 1932	August 1960	
247	2741	62741	The Blankney	2	July 1932	October 1958	
255	2742	62742	The Braes Of Derwent	2	August 1932	November 1958	
269	2743	62743	The Cleveland	2	August 1932	May 1960	
273	2744	62744	The Holderness	2	October 1932	December 1960	
282	2745	62745	The Hurworth	2	October 1932	March 1959	
283	2746	62746	The Middleton	2	August 1933	May 1958	
288	2747	62747	The Percy	2	August 1933	March 1961	
292	2748	62748	The Southwold	2	August 1933	December 1957	
297	2749	62749	The Cottesmore	2	August 1933	July 1958	
298	2750	62750	The Pytchley	2	September 1933	November 1958	
205	2751	62751	The Albrighton	2	July 1934	March 1959	
214	2752	62752	The Atherstone	2	July 1934	July 1958	
217	2753	62753	The Belvoir	2	July 1934	September 1959	
222	2754	62754	The Berkeley	2	July 1934	November 1958	
226	2755	62755	The Bilsdale	2	July 1934	November 1958	
230	2756	62756	The Brocklesby	2	August 1934	April 1958	
238	2757	62757	The Burton	2	August 1934	December 1957	
258	2758	62758	The Cattistock	2	August 1934	December 1957	
274	2759	62759	The Craven	2	August 1934	January 1961	
279	2760	62760	The Cotswold	2	September 1934	October 1959	
353	2761	62761	The Derwent	2	September 1934	December 1957	
357	2762	62762	The Fernie	2	September 1934	October 1960	
359	2763	62763	The Fitzwilliam	2	September 1934	January 1961	
361	2764	62764	The Garth	2	October 1934	November 1958	
362	2765	62765	The Goathland	2	October 1934	January 1961	
363	2766	62766	The Grafton	2	November 1934	September 1958	
364	2767	62767	The Grove	2	November 1934	October 1958	
365	2768	62768	The Morpeth	2	December 1934	November 1952	Rebuilt as 2-cylinder (Class D) in August 1942. Involved in an accident and withdrawn in 1952.
366	2769	62769	The Oakley	2	December 1934	September 1958	
368	2770	62770	The Puckeridge	2	December 1934	September 1959	
370	2771	62771	The Rufford	2	January 1935	October 1958	
374	2772	62772	The Sinnington	2	January 1935	September 1958	
375	2773	62773	The South Durham	2	January 1935	August 1958	
376	2774	62774	The Staintondale	2	February 1935	November 1958	
377	2775	62775	The Tynedale	2	February 1935	December 1958	

== Notes ==
D49/1 (Part 1) locomotives were built with 8-inch (200 mm) piston valves, activated by Walschaerts valve gear for the outside cylinders, and Gresley conjugated valve gear for the inside cylinder.

D49/3 (Part 3) locomotives were built with Lentz oscillating poppet valves activated by Walschaerts valve gear. All were later rebuilt to D49/1 valve gear arrangements.

D49/2 (Part 2) locomotives were built with Lentz poppet valves activated by rotary cams.
