= British Hound Sports Association =

Governing body for hunting in Great Britain

British Hound Sports Association (BHSA)
- Formation: June 2022
- Type: Governance and advocacy group
- Purpose: Regulation of hound sports (hunting) in Great Britain
- Location: Cirencester, United Kingdom
- Region served: United Kingdom
- Website: bhsa.org.uk

The British Hound Sports Association (BHSA) is the governing body for many hound sports associations in Great Britain. However, it is not the governing body for either draghound packs or bloodhound packs who are governed by the Master of Draghound & Bloodhounds Association (MDBA). The BHSA is responsible for setting standards and rules to which members and registered hunts are supposed to adhere. A sister organisation, the Hound Sports Regulatory Authority (HSRA), is responsible for regulatory and disciplinary matters for members and member hunts, in accordance with rules set by the BHSA.

The BHSA also provides support, training, guidance and supervision for all packs of hounds registered with them and individual hunt personnel, as well as other administrative functions previously carried out by the Hunting Office.

== Background and formation ==
By 2005, most forms of hunting with hounds had been made illegal across Great Britain, although many continue to be within the law in Northern Ireland. To preserve their traditional practices, most hunts switched to legal alternatives, such as drag hunting, clean boot hunting and, controversially, trail hunting.

The Hunting Office was established in 2005 as a central organisation, responsible for the administration of hunting with hounds in Great Britain. Its purpose, as stated on its website, was to "set and maintain high standards of conduct in the activity of hunting with hounds". A series of scandals and convictions for illegal hunting resulted in widespread loss of confidence in the organisation, directly leading to several major landowners suspending or permanently banning trail hunting on their land.

In response, the Masters of Foxhounds Association (MFHA), one of the Hunting Office's principle members, brought forward a proposal to replace the governing body. The BHSA was formally ratified as the new governing body at the Hunting Association's AGM on June 28, 2022; taking over the role which had previously been carried out by the Hunting Office.

== Composition and board ==
The BHSA is composed of several member hunting associations, principally the Masters of Foxhounds Association (MFHA) and the Association of Masters of Harriers and Beagles (AMHB).

According to the Hunting Office's website, the BHSA Board includes representatives from the hunting associations, veterinary professionals, legal practitioners and members of hunt staff.

== Criticism ==
A spokesperson for the Hunt Saboteurs Association described BHSA's formation thus;

This rebrand is nothing more than a thickening of the smokescreen that hangs over hunting. The hunters have always manipulated language to hide their real intentions: cub-hunting became autumn hunting; the British Field Sports Society was renamed Countryside Alliance, and now the Hunting Office morphs into the British Hound Sports Association.

== See also ==
- Fox hunting
- Trail hunting
- Clean boot hunting
- Drag hunting
- Protection of Wild Mammals (Scotland) Act 2002
- Hunting Act 2004
- Opposition to hunting
