= List of dog sports =

Dog sports are competitive activities specifically designed for dogs. Dogs typically participate in sports with the help of owners, although some dog sports do not require human participation. A 2015 survey found that dog owners of all classes participate in dog sports, with owners from large cities (over 500,000 people), medium cities (between 100,000 and 500,000 people), small cities (less than 100,000 people), and rural areas each accounting for roughly the same percentage of dog sport competitors.

According to the survey, the most popular dog sports are obedience sports, and the majority of people that compete in dog sports compete in over twelve dog sporting events per year. Additionally, the majority of owners that compete in dog sports are primarily motivated by internal motivators (such as satisfaction or improving their relationships with their dogs) rather than external motivators (such as prizes).

== Combat sports ==
Dog combat sports
Sport	Image	Brief description	Refs.
Baiting	A scene of 14th century bear baiting, with a chained bear attacked by several dogs, as men watch and encourage the dogs.	Dogs fight or torment other animals	
Dog fighting	An illustration showing two men holding dogs as they prepare to fight. A large crowd surrounds them.	Dogs fight other dogs	
Venatio	Mosaic showing Roman entertainments from the 1st century. Jamahiriya Museum, Tripoli, Libya. From Dar Buc Ammera villa (Zliten).	Gladiators fought various animals, including dogs	
Hog-dog rodeo		Dogs chase and capture hogs	

== Herding sports ==
Dog herding sports
Sport	Image	Brief description	Refs.
Sheepdog trial	A border collie dog stares aggressively at four sheep in a field.	Dogs compete their herding management skills	
Treibball	An Australian Cattle Dog pushes a large cyan ball.	Dogs drive large balls into goals	

== Obedience sports ==
Dog obedience sports
Sport	Image	Brief description	Refs.
Heelwork to music	A competitor with a black dog of unknown breed doing their routine at the heelwork to music show at Stoneleigh.	Dogs and humans perform trained routines to music	
Musical canine freestyle	A women in a green hat and jacket bending down, presumably ushering to a dog of unknown breed. The dog is stretching.	Dogs and humans perform freestyle dance to music	
Obedience trial	A woman and a German Sheperd walking.	Dogs execute predefined tasks	
Rally obedience	A woman in a red coat and a black dog walking past a wooden obstacle.	Dogs execute tasks without commands from judges and while receiving encouragement	
Schutzhund	A helper works a German Shepherd in a practice protection session during Schutzhund training. The dog is jumping and attacking the man's arm, which is heavily protected with padding.	Dogs compete in tracking, obedience, and protection skills	

== Pulling sports ==
Dog pulling sports
Sport	Image	Brief description	Refs.
Bikejoring	Two bikers on a dirt road are pulled each by a pair of dogs in a race.	Dogs pull humans on bicycles	
Canicross	A woman runs alongside two dogs down a road through a forest.	Cross-country running with dogs attached to a human	
Carting	A Collie dog wearing a harness attached to a wheelchair being ridden by a young woman near a beach.	Dogs pull items or people in a cart	
Dog scootering	A dog pulls a scooter being ridden by a person on a rural road.	Dogs pull humans on unmotorized scooters	
Mushing	A pack of Husky dogs pulling a sled being ridden by a man on a snowy road.	Dogs pull a sled, usually through snow	
Skijoring	A pair of black dogs pull a person on skis through the snow.	Dogs pull humans on skis	
Weight pulling	A dog pulling a cart full of concrete blocks.	Dogs pull heavy objects or weights	

== Racing sports ==
Dog racing sports
Sport	Image	Brief description	Refs.
Dachshund racing	A dachshund dog jumps through the air as it runs in a race.	Dachshund dogs race	
Greyhound racing	A greyhound dog jumps through the air as it runs in a race. It is wearing a blue vest with a white number two on it and a muzzle.	Greyhound dogs race	
Shepherd's Shemozzle		Humans race through an obstacle course alongside dogs	
Sled dog racing	A pack of Husky dogs pulling a sled being ridden by a man on a snowy road.	Dogs race while pulling a sled	
Terrier racing	Two terrier dogs run through grass. They are wearing muzzles and have crocheted dolls dressed as horse racers on their backs.	Terrier dogs race	

== Tracking and hunting sports ==
Dog tracking and hunting sports
Sport	Image	Brief description	Refs.
Beagling	An uncolored illustration of a scent hound chasing a rabbit through grass.	Scent hounds such as beagles track and hunt rabbits or hares by scent	
Coon hunting	Three men standing under a tree and holding dead raccoons alongside their hunting dogs.	Dogs track and hunt raccoons	
Coursing	A painting of two sighthounds mauling a fox as three hunters arrive on horseback in a snowy field.	Sighthounds hunt prey by sight and speed	
Drag hunting	An illustration of four hounds chasing rabbits and cats as their owner calls from behind heavy foliage. A white horse stands behind the owner.	Humans on horseback follow a scent using dogs	
Earthdog trial	Two terrier dogs sniff a box made of wood and wire holding white mice as they prepare for an earthdog trial.	Short-legged dogs navigate tunnels while hunting a rat or mouse	
Field trial	A golden retriever walking through a field as it holds a dead pheasant in its mouth.	Dogs compete in field hunting events	
Fox hunting	A painting of a pack of dogs barking at a fox cornered against a tree as a second fox retreats in the distance.	Dogs track and hunt foxes by scent	
Hare coursing	A Sloughi dog closely chases a rabbit.	Dogs hunt rabbits or hares by sight	
Hound trailing	A pack of hounds run through a grassy field next to a stone wall.	Hounds race along a scent trail	
Hunting the clean boot		Hounds track a natural human scent	
Lure coursing	An Italian greyhound wearing a white vest chasing a plastic lure. A second dog wearing a red vest tries to catch up in the background.	Dogs chase a mechanically-operated lure	
Nosework	A leashed German Shepherd dog sniffs the side of a brown car.	Dogs search for target odors while ignoring distractions	
Tracking trial	A man watches as a leashed German Shepherd dog follows a trail in a grassy field.	Dogs track a target by scent	
Trail hunting	Two men on horseback ride alongside a pack of hounds in a grassy field.	A pack of hounds tracks an artificially-laid trail of animal urine	

== Water sports ==
Dog water sports
Sport	Image	Brief description	Refs.
Dock jumping	A black dog jumping off of a dock into the water below.	Dogs compete to jump furthest into water	
Dog surfing	A dog, wearing a pink life vest, is seen surfing with all four paws on the board.	Dogs surf, either with or without human partners	

== Other sports ==
Other dog sports
Sport	Image	Brief description	Refs.
Agility	A Chinese crested dog jumps over several poles.	Dogs are guided through an obstacle course to compete for speed and accuracy	
Dog skateboarding	A white fluffy dog rides on a skateboard.	Dogs ride skateboards	
Disc dog	A man holding several frisbees ducks as a black and white dog jumps over his head to catch a frisbee in flight.	Dogs compete to catch frisbees	
Flyball	A small dog jumps over hurdles.	Teams of dogs race over hurdles to retrieve a ball	
Puppy Bowl	A crowd watches a miniature American football stadium, inside of which are several women holding puppies. Several dog toys are scattered across the field. On the wall behind the stadium is a large logo depicting an American football and a bone-shaped dog tag emblazoned with the words "PUPPY BOWL XIII".	Puppies play with toys in a miniature American football stadium	

== See also ==
- List of sports - for sports involving humans
- List of equestrian sports - for sports involving horses
