= Kimblewick =

Kimblewick, Kimberwicke or Kimberwick

- Great and Little Kimble, civil parish in Wycombe district, Buckinghamshire, England
- Kimblewick (bit), a mouthpiece for horses
- Kimblewick Hunt, a hunt formed in 2002
