= Ashford Valley Hunt =

British foxhound pack

The Ashford Valley Hunt is a United Kingdom foxhound pack, with hunting country in Kent, England.

== History ==
The hunt was formed in 1873 from the combination of four private harrier packs, which amalgamated under a single master as the Ashford Valley Harriers, hunting predominantly hares but also occasional foxes. After the First World War, the pack began to hunt foxes only and renamed itself the Ashford Valley Foxhounds. The pack will become the Ashford Valley Tickham Hunt at the end of the 2012–2013 hunting season, after the West Street Tickham Hunt disbands. The hunt country will be split between the East Kent and the Ashford Valley.

== Country ==
The hunt country lies in the West of Kent, adjacent to other packs such as the Southdown and Eridge Hunt, East Sussex and Romney Marsh Hunt and the West Street Tickham Hunt. Major meeting points include the Boxing Day meet in Tenterden, and Tunbridge Wells.

== See also ==
- List of fox hunts in the United Kingdom
