= Fly ball =

Fly ball may refer to:

- Fly ball (baseball), a baseball term
- Fly ball governor, see centrifugal governor
- Flyball, a dog sport
