= USCSS =

USCSS may refer to:

- United States Canine Scent Sports, a governing body in nosework
- United States Commercial Star Ship, a fictional spaceship designation from the Alien franchise
- United States Coast Survey Steamer, a former designation for steamships
- UN/LOCODE:USCSS, the UN/LOCODE geographic code for Clifton Springs, New York, US
