= Trailing =

Trailing can mean, among others:

- Facing and trailing, in railroads
- The act of using a Trailer (promotion)
- Trailing wheel
- Trailing arm
- Trailing edge
- Hound trailing
- Trailing twelve months
