= Hound trailing =

Dog sport

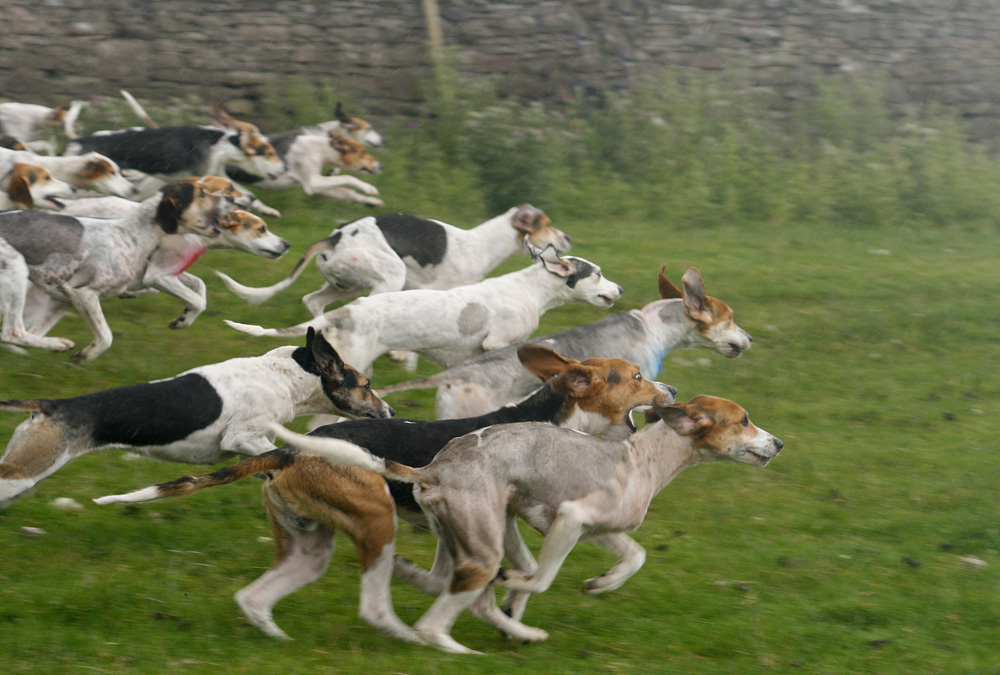
Racing hounds in 2008

Hound trailing, or hound racing, is a dog sport that uses specially bred hounds to race along an artificially laid scent trail over a cross country course.

== Description ==
Hound trailing is a race between hounds along an artificially laid scent trail. The sport is a combination of drag hunting, dog racing and steeplechasing, with the hounds taking the place of horses. The hounds follow a man-laid scent, the scent trail being usually laid by dragging a piece of fabric, slightly soaked with a combination of aniseed and paraffin oil, along the course.

Trail hounds over 2 years old race in adult races, whilst those between 1 year old and 2 years old race in puppy races. Adult races are approximately 10 miles (16 km) long and the hounds in the adult races typically take 30 minutes to finish; times outside 25 and 45 minutes are declared void. Puppy races are approximately 5 miles (8.0 km) long. When racing, the hounds' coats are closely shaved to prevent them from overheating during the race.

Unlike in other forms of hunting, humans do not follow the hounds, instead the hounds conduct the course unassisted and spectators can observe parts of the race from vantage points through binoculars. The season is between April and October and the hound that wins the most races in a season is crowned the season's champion.

Hound trailing is effectively confined to the British Isles, it is particularly popular in Cumbria, the Scottish Borders, parts of Yorkshire and parts of Ireland.

== History ==
Hound trailing originated in the 18th century as a means of various hunt masters testing their fox hounds against each other in match races.

In 1763 a celebrated match race for 500 guineas occurred between John Smith-Barry's prized Bluecap and Bluecap's daughter Wanton against Hugo Meynell's Richmond and a favourite bitch from the Quorn Hunt. A 4-mile (6.4 km) drag was laid at Newmarket Heath with Bluecap winning in a little over 8 minutes, Wanton a close second, Richmond third by over 100 yards (91 m) and the bitch failing to finish. Of the 60 horses that started with the hounds, only 12 finished. As a comparison, it was said that Eclipse ran a 4-mile race at York, carrying 12-stone (76 kg), in the same time.

Another early example was that of Colonel Thomas Thornton's bitch Merkin, with whom in the 1790s Colonel Thornton challenged any hound in England of the same age to beat over a 5-mile (8.0 km) course, for 10,000 guineas and giving 220 yards (200 m). Merkin had run a 4-mile trail at Newmarket in 7 minutes and half a second. Later Colonel Thornton challenged any hound in England to a match with his 2-year-old hound Madcap for 500 guineas and giving 100 yards. Madcap's brother Lounger, at 4 years old, was challenged to a match against Hugo Meynell's Pillager and any other hound of Meynell's choosing, although upon sighting Lounger it was felt best by Meynell to forfeit.

Hound trailing or hound racing became particularly popular in the Lake District, with hunt masters of packs conducting match races over laid drag lines. The rapid rise in the popularity of the sport led to the establishment of the Hound Trailing Association in 1906, this was followed by the Border Hound Trailing Association in 1933 and later the Yorkshire Hound Trailing Association and associations in County Cork and County Kerry.

== Trail hounds ==
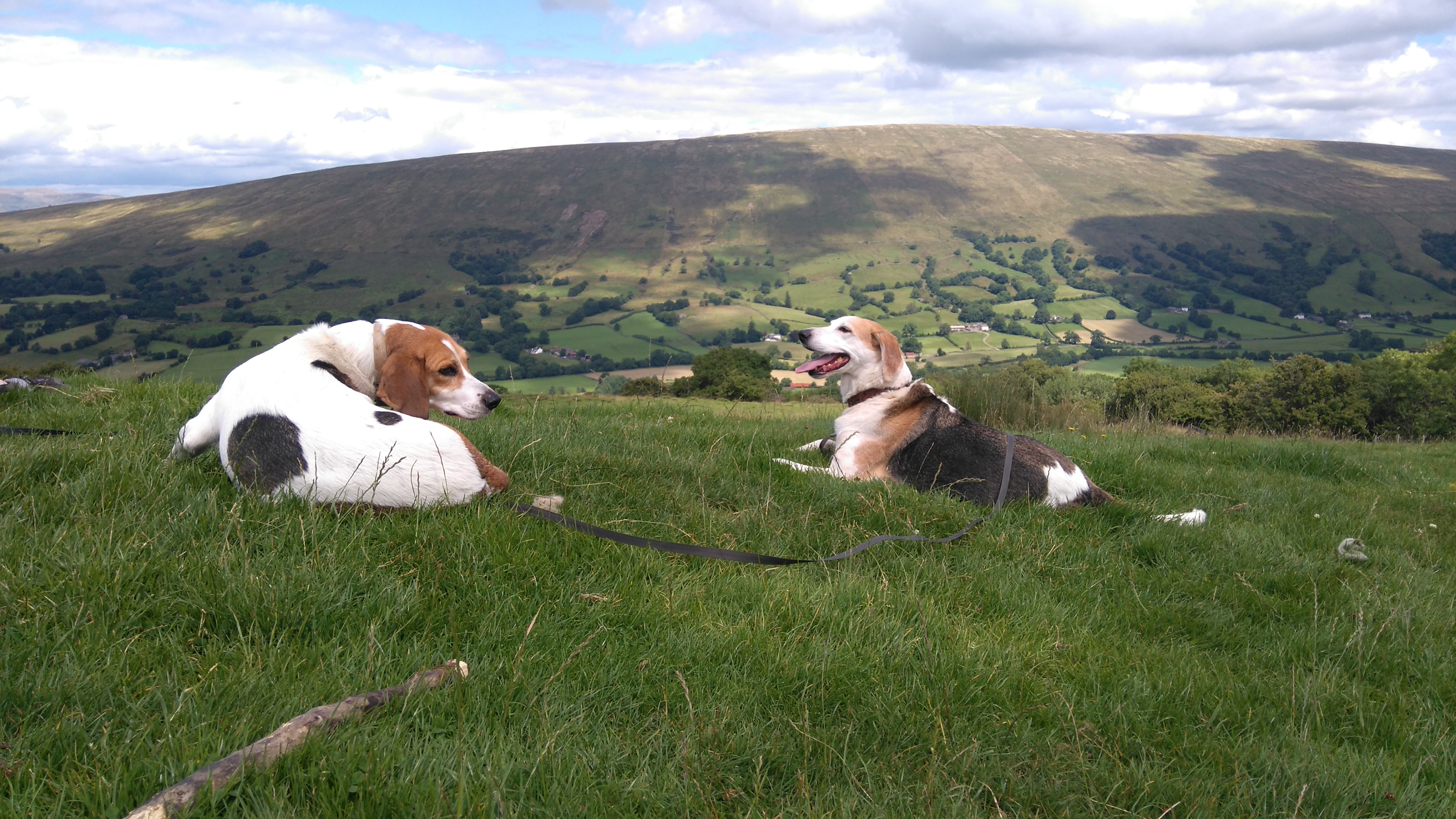
Modern, domesticated trail hounds

Trail hounds have evolved into a distinct breed or type of hound specifically bred for performance alone, they are sleek, hard muscled hounds with almost whippet like bodies.

Trail hounds descend from the Fell hounds, foxhounds found in the north of England. In his Foxes, foxhounds and fox-hunting, Richard Clapham stated "fell hounds trace their origin back to the old Talbot tans, while they later acquired a certain infusion of pointer blood ... in order to make hounds carry their heads higher." He further states the "fell hound is the antithesis of the Peterborough type. Instead of size, weight and power, we have lightness, activity, and pace, coupled with wonderful stamina..." In his Hounds of the World, Sir John Buchanan-Jardine stated the fell hound was descended from the Chien Blanc, a French hound that shares a common ancestor with the Poitevin, a scent hound known for its speed.

Later harrier blood was introduced. In 1919 a Windemere Harrier Cracker was introduced, in 1922 further harrier blood was introduced from Lancashire packs and in 1928 a harrier Beware sired a litter that was to become dominant in hound trailing. Further out-crosses introduced pointer blood, in the mid-1920s a pointer-harrier cross bitch Gravity was introduced, whose descendants remain influential to this day.

Famous trail hounds include Rattler, the first hound to win a hundred prizes but was poisoned by a competitor and Hartsop Magic who won thirty two prizes in 1985, twenty six in 1986 and thirty three in 1987. And more recently Progress. Progress was in the Border Hound Trailing Association. In his racing career he won four Senior championships, three Langholm common ridings and an international. Also in the four Seasons he ran 280 Trails, finishing in the first six 233 times, 202 of those times in the first three.

== See also ==
- Drag hunting
- Trail hunting
- List of dog sports
