= Old Surrey Burstow and West Kent Hunt =

Foxhound pack in south east England

Hunt Logo

The Old Surrey, Burstow and West Kent Hunt is an English foxhound pack, with hunting country covering around 42 miles east to west and 30 miles north to south, within the counties of Surrey, Sussex and Kent.

== History ==
The hunt was formed by the merger of three separate foxhound packs: the Old Surrey, the Burstow and the West Kent.

The first recorded pack on the Surrey country was in 1735 at Lovells Grove, Croydon, where the Earl of Onslow lived, and by 1800 a pack for members of the merchant class (as opposed to the aristocracy) was hunting the country. In 1808 is found the first evidence of the Old Surrey pack, based in Godstone, and retaining the merchant membership.

The Burstow pack dates from around 1866, having previously been a harrier pack. Having been originally based at Poundhill, the pack moved to Felbridge in 1909.

In 1915, the Old Surrey and Burstow hunts amalgamated, and took the Felbridge base of the Burstow as their home.

The West Kent hunt dates back to 1776, and did not join with the Old Surrey and Burstow until 1999.

== Hunt Country ==
The hunt covers three territories, as a result of the merger of the three former hunts, which gives the hunt a large country, although a large portion is not huntable due to urbanisation, roads and railway lines. The country runs from the M23 motorway in the west to Hadlow in the East, and from the Isle of Grain in the North to Fletching in the south.

Settlements within the hunt's country include Edenbridge, Horsted Keynes, Penshurst and Mereworth.

== Pony Club ==
The hunt is linked to branches of The Pony Club including an Old Surrey and Burstow Branch.

== See also ==
- List of fox hunts in the United Kingdom
