= Essex and Suffolk Hunt =

English fox hunting pack

- Hunt type: Fox hunting
- Country: England

History
- Founded: 1791
- Founded by: Sir William Rowley

Hunt information
- Hound breed: Foxhound
- Hunt country: Essex & Suffolk.
- Quarry: Fox
- Kennelled: Layham
- Website: www.essexandsuffolkhunt.co.uk/

The Essex and Suffolk Hunt is an English fox hunting pack founded in 1791.

== History ==
The hunt is reputed to have been founded in 1791 by Sir William Rowley from a pack of hounds purchased from the Duke of York. The pack was originally kenneled at Sir William's residence, Tendring Hall Park in Stoke-by-Nayland.

In 1808 Mr Carrington Nunn succeeded Sir William as Master, remaining for about 50 years before handing over to his nephew Captain White, who moved the hounds to new kennels he built in Stratford St. Mary.

The kennels were moved to their current location in Layham during the Secord World War.

== Hunt country ==
The hunt's country covers an area approximately 25 miles north to south and the same east to west, in Essex and Suffolk.

== See also ==
- List of foxhound packs of the United Kingdom
