= Duke of Buccleuch's Hunt =

Trail hunt in Scotland

- Hunt type: Fox hunting
- Country: Scotland

History
- Founded: 1827
- Founded by: 5th Duke of Buccleuch

Hunt information
- Hound breed: Foxhound
- Hunt country: Berwickshire, Roxburghshire and Selkirkshire
- Quarry: Fox
- Website: www.dukeofbuccleuchhounds.co.uk

The Duke of Buccleuch's Hunt was a fox hunt which hunted in the Scottish Borders area of Scotland. Since the Scottish ban on fox hunting it has become a drag hunt, "The Duke of Buccleuch's Hounds", which lays an artificial scent trail for hounds to follow.

== History ==
The Duke of Buccleuch's Hunt was founded in 1827 by Walter Montagu Douglas Scott, 5th Duke of Buccleuch who purchased the pack from George Baillie.

The huntsmen of the Duke of Buccleuch's Hunt have been:

- Will Williamson (1827–63)
- Will Shore (1863–1902)
- George Summers (1902–48)
- Tom Smith (1948–64), kennel huntsman until 1977
- Sir Hugh Arbuthnot (1964–76)
- Captain Simon Clarke (1976–80)
- Lionel Salter (1980–87)
- Tony Mould (1987–89)
- Trevor Adams (1989–2014)
- Tim Allen (2014–2024)
- Poppy Tutcher (2024–present)

The Duke of Buccleuch's Hunt hounds are English Foxhounds, originally Old English Foxhounds were used but more modern lines were introduced from the 1970s.

== Hunt country ==
The hunt's country is the largest in Scotland, covering an area in the counties of Berwickshire, Roxburghshire and Selkirkshire, from west of Hawick to east of Kelso, from the foothills of the Cheviots to the bottom of the Lammermuirs.

During the hunting season, the hunt meets twice a week.

== See also ==
- Fox hunting
- List of foxhound packs of the United Kingdom
