= Treibball =

Dog sport

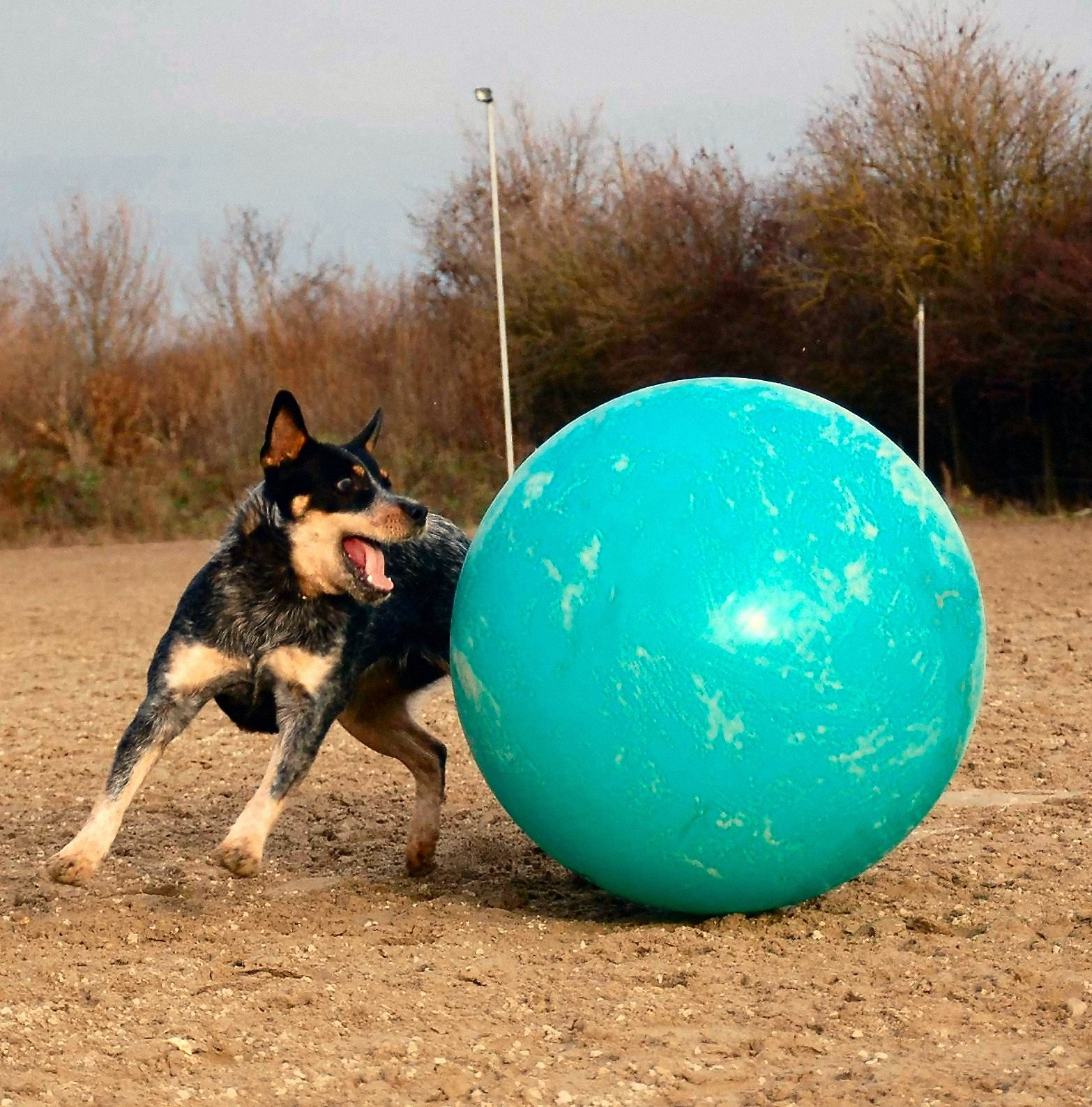
- An Australian Cattle Dog playing Treibball
- Nicknames: Urban herding
- First played: 2005

Characteristics
- Type: Dog sport
- Equipment: "Rolling sheep"

Presence
- Country or region: Germany

Treibball ([ˈtʁaɪbˌbal], German for drive ball), also known as urban herding, is a competitive dog sport which originated in Germany in 2005. In the sport, a dog must gather and drive large exercise balls into a goal by working with a human handler.

== History ==
Treibball originated in 2005 in Germany, and was invented by Dutch dog trainer Jan Nijboer. The sport was invented to keep herding dogs active in places where livestock herding is not possible, such as urban environments. He introduced the sport to his students, and it quickly spread across Europe. The first sanctioned Treibball competition was held in 2008. The sport eventually gained popularity in the United States after 2009 when a video featuring the sport titled Hund mit 8 Ballen went viral.

== Sport ==
The aim of the sport is for the dog to get eight large exercise balls into a goal. The eight balls are initially set up in a triangle formation similar to billiards, and the dog's handler stays in one spot near the goal. Using only whistles, verbal commands, or hand signals, the handler must communicate with the dog to get it to push the balls into the goal. The balls must be put into the goal in a particular order, and there is a time limit.

Treibball balls range from 45 to 75 centimeters in diameter, and are known as "rolling sheep". The playing field is between 30 and 50 meters long and between 15 and 25 meters wide. Treibball is loosely based on herding trials, and because of this, herding dogs have a natural advantage in learning the sport. Unlike livestock herding, however, any breed of dog is capable of learning and playing Treibball effectively.

== See also ==
- List of dog sports
