= Belchford =

Village and civil parish in the East Lindsey district of Lincolnshire, England

Coordinates: 53.260089°N 0.060636°W

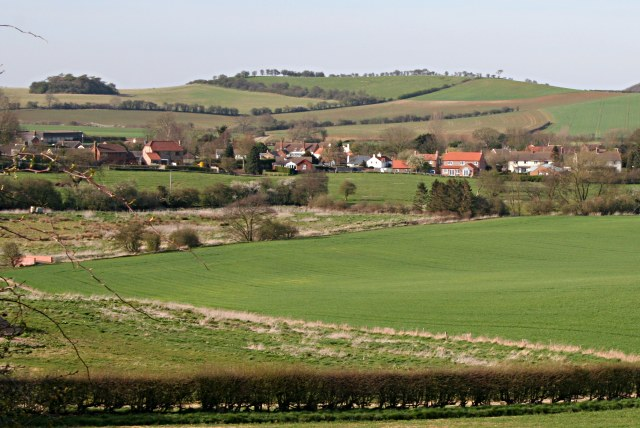
- The village as viewed from the south.

- Location within Lincolnshire
- Population: 255 (2011)
- OS grid reference: TF294754
  - London: 120 mi (190 km) S
- Civil parish: Belchford
- District: East Lindsey
- Shire county: Lincolnshire
- Region: East Midlands
- Country: England
- Sovereign state: United Kingdom
- Post town: HORNCASTLE
- Postcode district: LN9
- Dialling code: 01507
- Police: Lincolnshire
- Fire: Lincolnshire
- Ambulance: East Midlands
- UK Parliament: Louth and Horncastle

Belchford is a village and civil parish in the East Lindsey district of Lincolnshire, England. The village is situated approximately 4 miles (6 km) north of Horncastle and just to the east of the A153. At the 2011 census, the population of the parish was 255.

== History ==
The village's history dates back to the Romans and the Vikings. In 1536, during the Reformation, the vicar of Belchford was hanged, drawn and quartered for treason, after leading a rebellion against the crown.

== Geography ==
Steep hills and deep valleys surround the village. Belchford lies in the Lincolnshire Wolds, a designated Area of Outstanding Natural Beauty running from Louth in the north, to Horncastle in the south. The village attracts ramblers, and hang-gliders who use the ridges from the Bluestone Heath Road to launch into the valley.

The Viking Way, a national long distance footpath, passes through Belchford by the Blue Bell Inn, on its way from the Humber in the north to Rutland in the south.

== Culture and community ==
=== Belchford Downhill Challenge ===
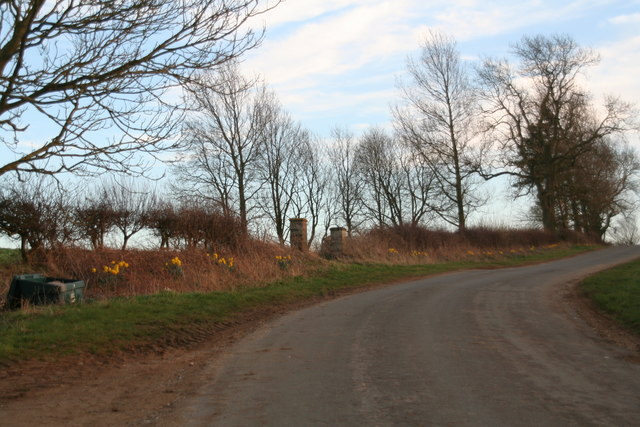
Furlong Lane along which the Downhill Challenge takes place.

The Belchford Downhill Challenge is held every year in September, as a competition for gravity powered soapbox carts, sidecar outfits and bicycles that race down a half mile course on a steep closed public road at up to 50 mph. The event attracts approximately 50 competing teams from around the UK and is combined with a craft fair with other attractions for children. Spectator turnout for the event is generally about 3,000.

=== South Wold Hunt ===
The South Wold Hunt is based near Belchford.

The hunt was founded in 1823 by the Hon. George Pelham (the younger brother to Lord Yarborough). In the mid-1850s the hunt built kennels at Belchford. During the Second World War the Agricultural Executive occupied the kennels and so the country was temporarily split with the hounds kennelled at Aswardby on the eastern side and Edlington Hall on the western side. The pack were united again in the 1948–49 season when the hounds returned to the kennels at Belchford where they remain today. The South Wold Hounds are hunted every Saturday and most Tuesdays throughout the season, over a varied country which includes part of the Lincolnshire Wolds and the Marsh. The country extends from Market Rasen Racecourse in the north-west to the coast in the east. Woodhall Spa is at the south-west of the Hunt's country.

=== Landmarks ===
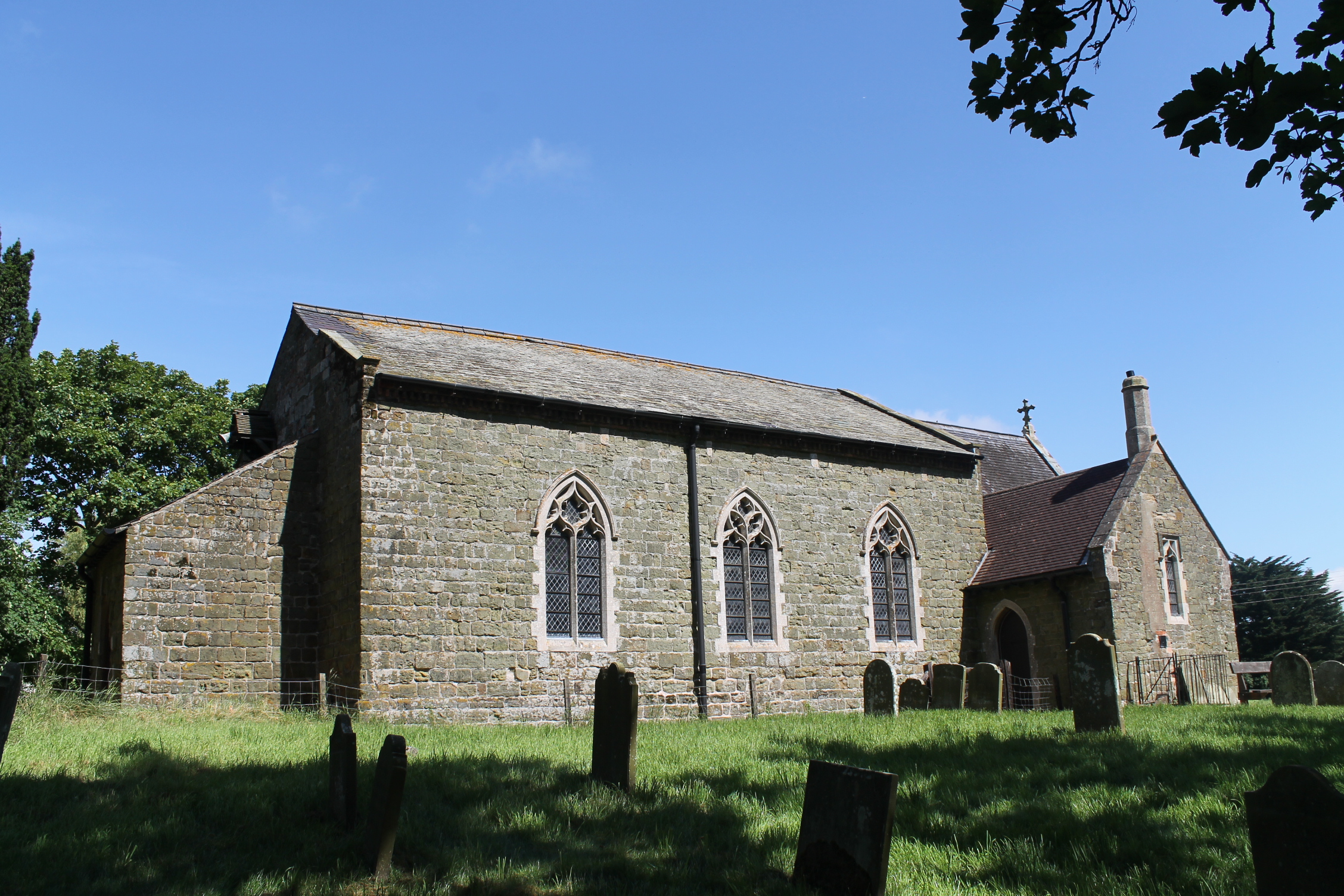
St. Peter and St. Paul's church

The Grade II listed parish church of Belchford is dedicated to St Peter and St Paul The original church was built before 1153, but was rebuilt in 1781, with later additions in 1859. The font is 15th-century; the altar and reredos 19th-century.

The village public house is the Blue Bell Inn, which has a restaurant, and provides locally brewed beer.

== See also ==
- Juicetrump Hill
- Viking Way long distance footpath
- Lincolnshire Wolds
