= Juicetrump Hill =

Hill

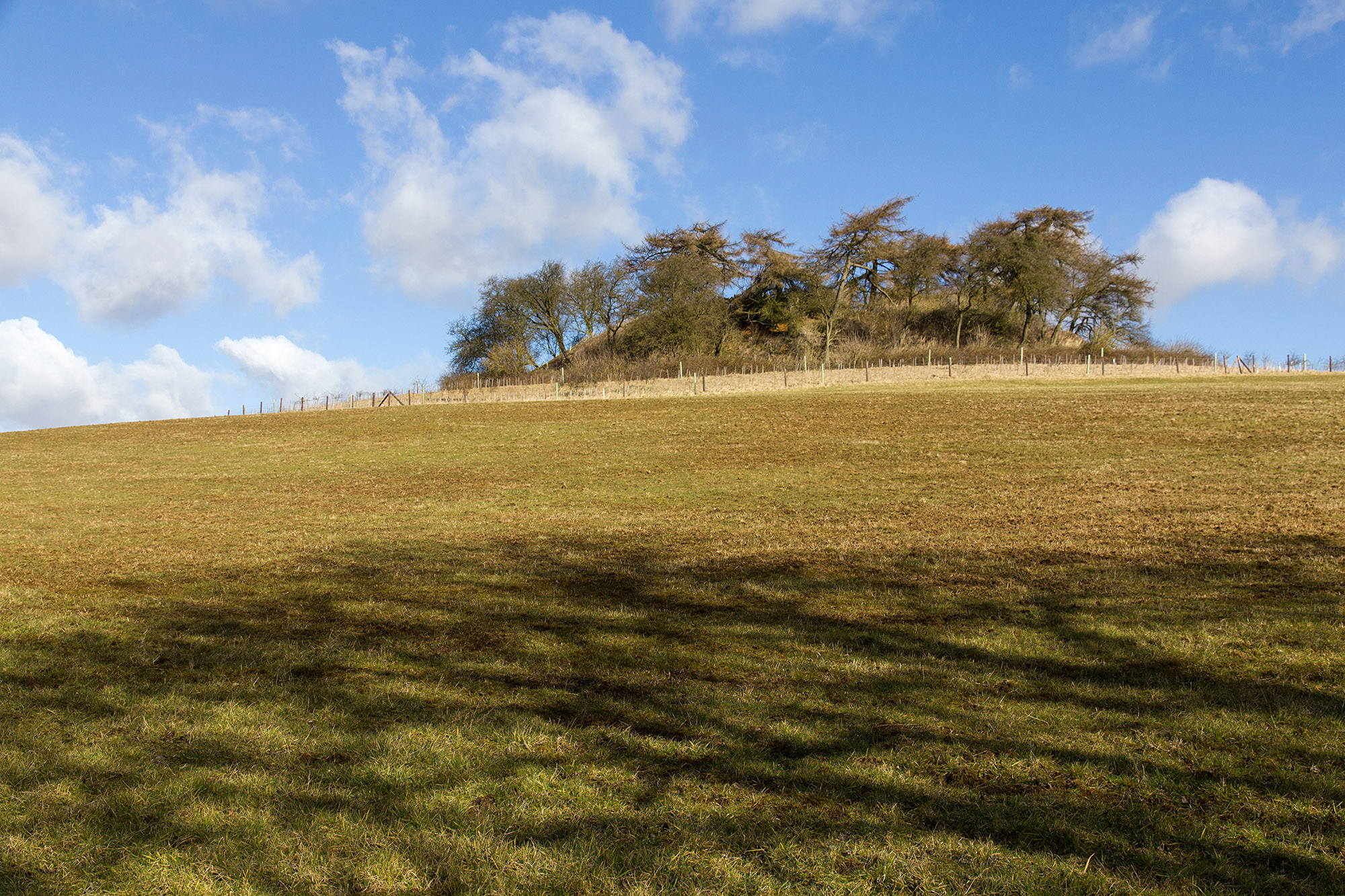
- The summit of Juicetrump Hill from the south.

Highest point
- Elevation: 124 m (407 ft)
- Parent peak: Park Hill
- Coordinates: 53°16′10″N 0°04′08″W

Geography
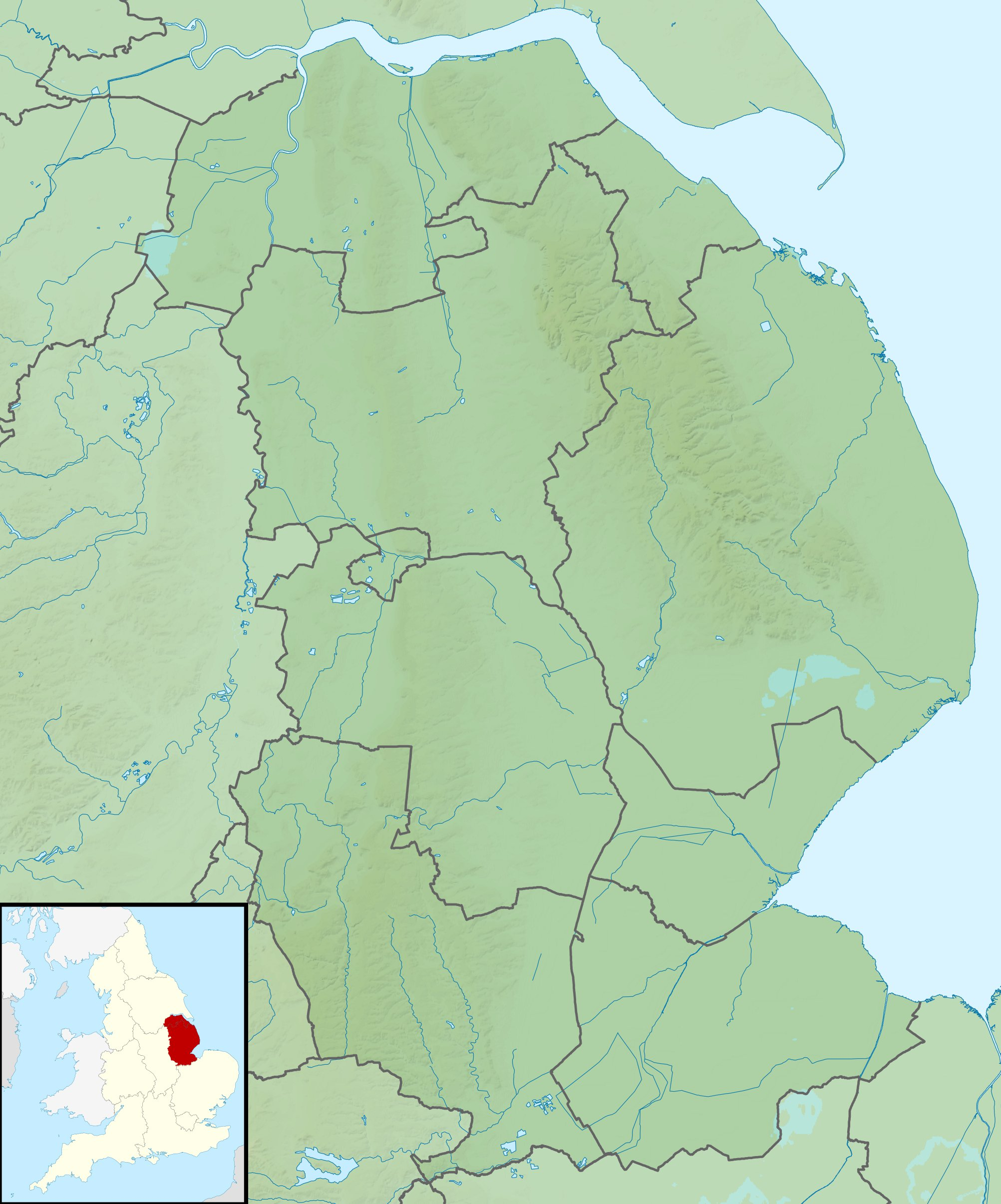
- Location within Lincolnshire
- Location: Lincolnshire Wolds, England
- Parent range: Lincolnshire Wolds
- OS grid: TF 28878 76457

Juicetrump Hill is a hill around half a mile north of Belchford and 4.5 miles north-east of Horncastle in Lincolnshire, UK within the Lincolnshire Wolds. The summit elevation is 124 m (407 ft) and it forms part of the slightly higher Park Hill with its summit of 140m just to the north-east. The Database of British and Irish Hills records Park Hill as having a height of 139 m (456 ft), and a topographic prominence (drop) of 31 m (102 ft), and being a TuMP ("Thirty and upwards Metre Prominence").

It is a limestone outcrop known as a Roachstone with the underlying Tealby Clays having been eroded at a faster rate.

The Viking Way long-distance footpath runs along the western flank of the hill, though there is no public access to the summit itself.

On the summit is a possible Neolithic long barrow, though this is disputed.

== See also ==
- Viking Way
- Belchford
- Lincolnshire Wolds
