= Nosework =

Dog sport

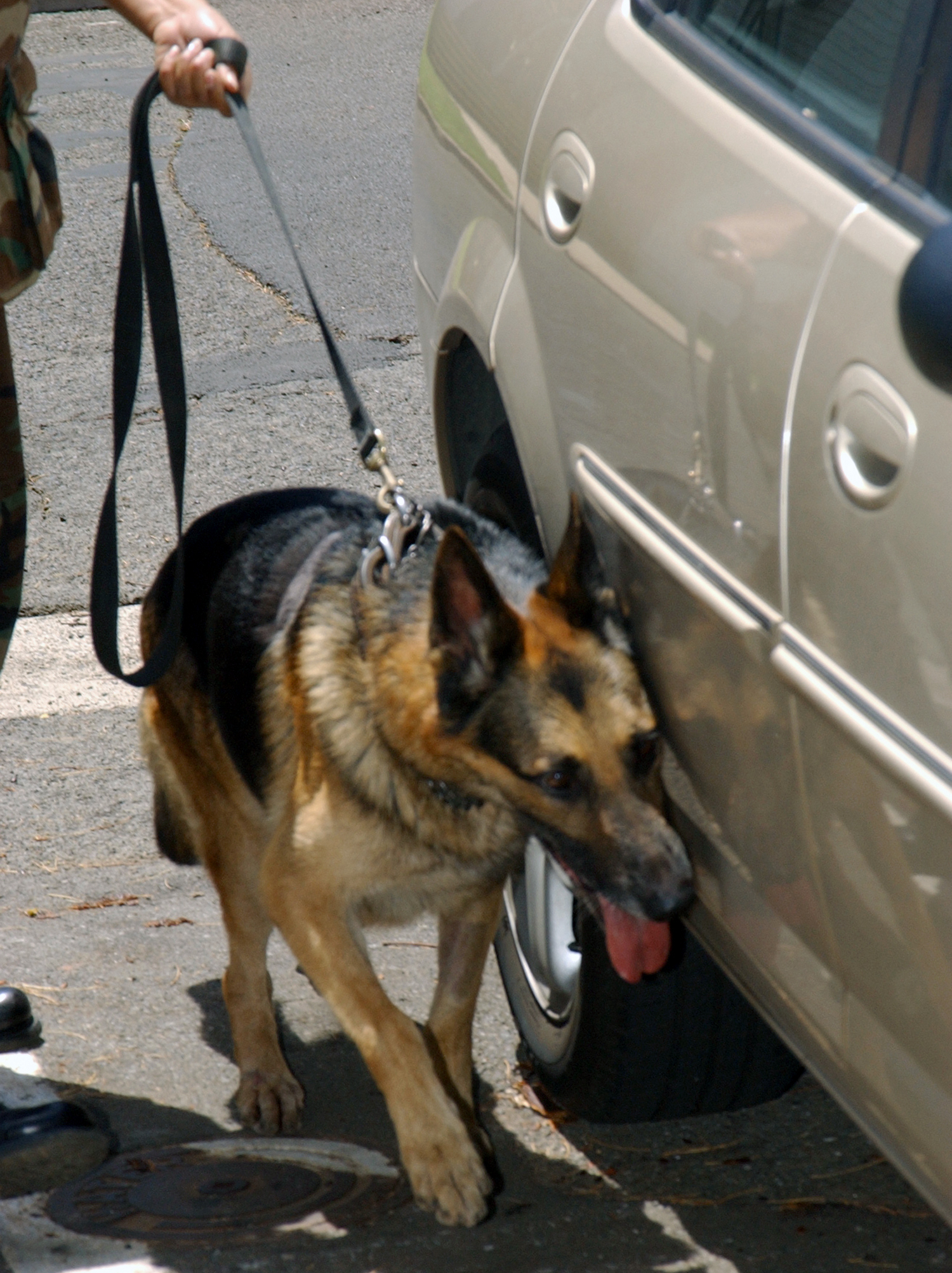
Dogs search for an odor hidden on a vehicle in one of the tests.

Nosework, also known as scent work or scent detection, is a dog sport created to emulate tasks performed by professional detection dog. In the sport, one dog and one handler form a team where the dog must find a hidden target odor, often ignoring distractions such as food or toys, and alert the handler once the target odor is found.

== Odors ==
Dogs hunt for specific odors. Unlike working with professional detection dogs, all odors used in sport nosework are legal to carry and own. Each governing body sets their own standard for which odors are the target odors and which levels they are paired with.

The odor is often dripped on a cotton swab, which is then hidden in a search area. The odor-dripped swab is called the 'hide'. At the lower levels, a single odor would be used. At higher levels, two or three of the odors might be mixed to create a unique combination odor. Common odors include anise, birch, clove, myrrh, pine, thyme, vetiver oil, and wintergreen.

== Elements ==
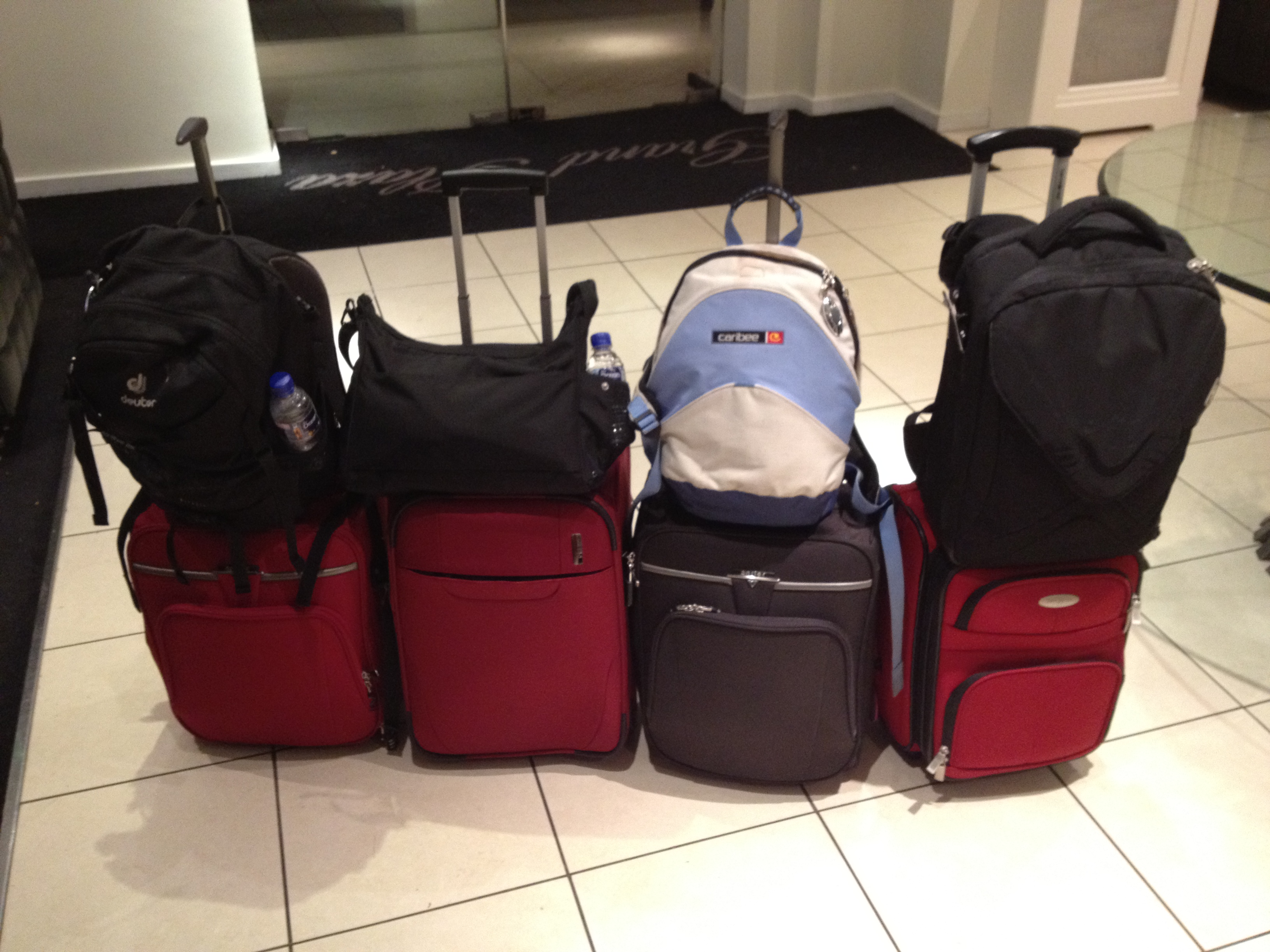
Containers are often boxes or luggage.

An element is a specific type of search area used in nosework. They include:

Interior building search
This takes place on the inside of any building. Searches can be a single one room or multiple rooms. There is often an option for the search to be done on or off-leash.
Exterior area search
This takes place outside, often it contains grass, dirt, cement and/or gravel. These searches can be especially difficult for the dogs as there are a number of new smells (trash, food, animals, etc.), the dogs work in all weather conditions, and the dogs may be tempted to mark or eliminate.
Vehicle searches
These are usually three or more vehicles. The 'hide' is always on the outside of the vehicle. The types of vehicle used varies from compact cars to horse trailers to semi-trucks.
Container searches
The types of containers used varies depending on the level. Beginning levels use plain white cardboard boxes. More advanced levels use luggage, plastic bins, etc. Containers may be arranged in a pattern or randomly on the floor, or they may be placed up on chairs in a higher level.
Buried searches
These are a subset of container searches meant to simulate to work that professional cadaver dogs do. The hide is placed in a container and then covered in sand or water.
Handler discrimination
This is another category that also uses containers. Instead of a cotton swab hide, an article of clothing (usually a glove or a sock) that belongs to the dog's handler is placed in a container. The dog must then determine which box contains the correct article. This simulates the work that professional tracking dogs do when searching for people.

== Governing bodies ==
- American Kennel Club (AKC) Scent Work
- Australian Canine Scent Work (ACSW): ACSW is the only governing body for nosework in Australia, established in 2014.
- Canadian Kennel Club (CKC) Scent Detection
- National Association of Canine Scent Work (NACSW) is the oldest governing body in nosework, established in the mid-2000s. NACSW is the only organization that offers formal training for individuals who want to teach nosework. Individuals who successfully complete this instructor training program become Certified Nose Work Instructors (CNWIs).
- Sporting Detection Dogs Association (SDDA): The SDDA is the first Canadian sanctioning body for nosework. Established in 2013, their first trial in western Canada took place in October 2014.
- United Kennel Club (UKC) Nosework
- United States Canine Scent Sports (USCSS)
- Canine - Work And Games (C-WAGS) first nosework trial December 2012
- Icelandic NoseWork club (ÍNWK)
- Swedish Nosework Club (SNWK) Established in 2014 and a part of Swedish Kennel Club

== Levels ==
The National Association of Canine Scent Work has three title levels. the first level (NW1) shows proficiency in one odor, four elements, with one 'hide' in each element. Level NW2 has two odors, four elements, two hides per element, and the container search will contain at least one distractor (food, toys etc.). Level NW3 has three odors, multiple hides in each element, and the interior search may even have no hides at all and must be called "Clear" by the team.

The Sport Detection Dog Association uses only three elements; they do not use vehicles. With SDDA, level SD-S has one odor, three elements, and one hide per element. Level SD-A has two odors, three elements, up to two hides for each element, and one distractor for container. Level SD-E has three odors, three elements, up to three hides for each element, and one distractor for container.

The United Kennel Club uses five odors and has five levels/titles including: Novice Nosework, Advance Nosework, Superior Nosework, Master Nosework, and Elite Nosework.

The Australian Canine Scent Work follows the rules and format of NACSW.

Canine - Work And Games (C-WAGS) uses four odors and nine different classes.

== Benefits for behavioral problems in dogs ==
Nosework is a relatively new sport so little research has been done on it as a behavior modification tool.

A paper was presented at the 2011 American College of Veterinary Behaviorists and American Veterinary Society of Animal Behavior symposium, by Dr. Valli Parthasarathy on using nosework as a behavior modification protocol. One pilot study has been done to see if human perceptions of canines change after a nosework class.

Some anecdotal evidence suggests nosework has helped dogs with behavior problems. Canines with a fear of humans can work and be rewarded in an environment with people around, but the dogs are not forced to interact. In nosework dogs are worked one at a time, so canines with dog aggression are able to have fun without other dogs in close proximity.

There can also be an increase in time spent with the dog, while participating in nosework. Research has shown that even a slight increase in time spent interacting with your dog, will decrease the dog's separation anxiety, improve obedience and help form a stronger human-canine bond.
