= Flyball =

Sport where teams of dogs race each other

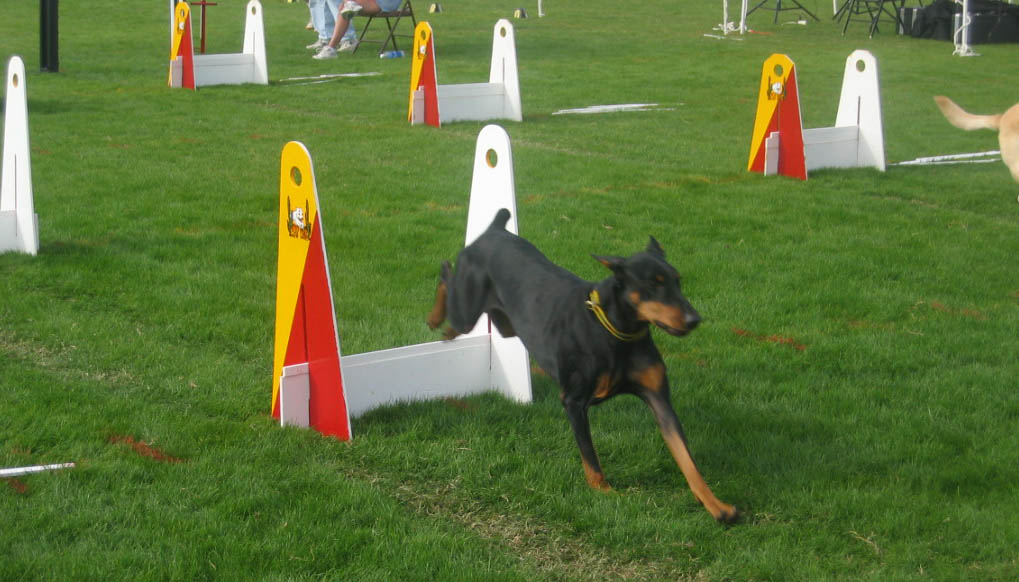
- Dogs from two teams race against each other over parallel lines of jumps. The jump height is based on the smallest dog on each team.

Flyball is a dog sport in which teams of dogs race against each other from the start to the finish line, over a line of hurdles, to a box that releases a ball to be caught when the dog presses the spring-loaded pad, then back to their handlers while carrying the ball.

Flyball is run in teams of four dogs, two dogs or singles as a relay. The course consists of four hurdles placed 10 feet (3.0 m) apart from each other, with the starting line six feet (1.8 m) from the first hurdle, and the flyball box 15 feet (4.6 m) after the last one, making for a 51-foot (16 m) length. The hurdle height is determined by the ulna's length or the smallest dog's shoulder height on the team (depending on the association). For example, under current North American Flyball Association (NAFA) rules, this should be 6 inches (15 cm) below the withers height of the smallest dog, to a height of no less than 7 inches (18 cm) and no greater than 14 inches (36 cm).

United Kingdom Flyball League (UKFL) uses a patented ulna measuring device, measuring the distance between the 'elbow' and bone of the stopper pad with a minimum height of 6 inches (15 cm) and a maximum of 12 inches (30 cm). Current EFC (European Flyball Championship) rules limit the height to no less than 17.5 cm and no greater than 35 cm. Each dog must return its ball all the way across the start line before the next dog crosses. Ideal running is nose-to-nose at the start line. The first team to have all four dogs cross the finish line error free wins the heat. Penalties are applied to teams if the ball is dropped before crossing the last hurdle or if the next relay dog is released early.

== History ==
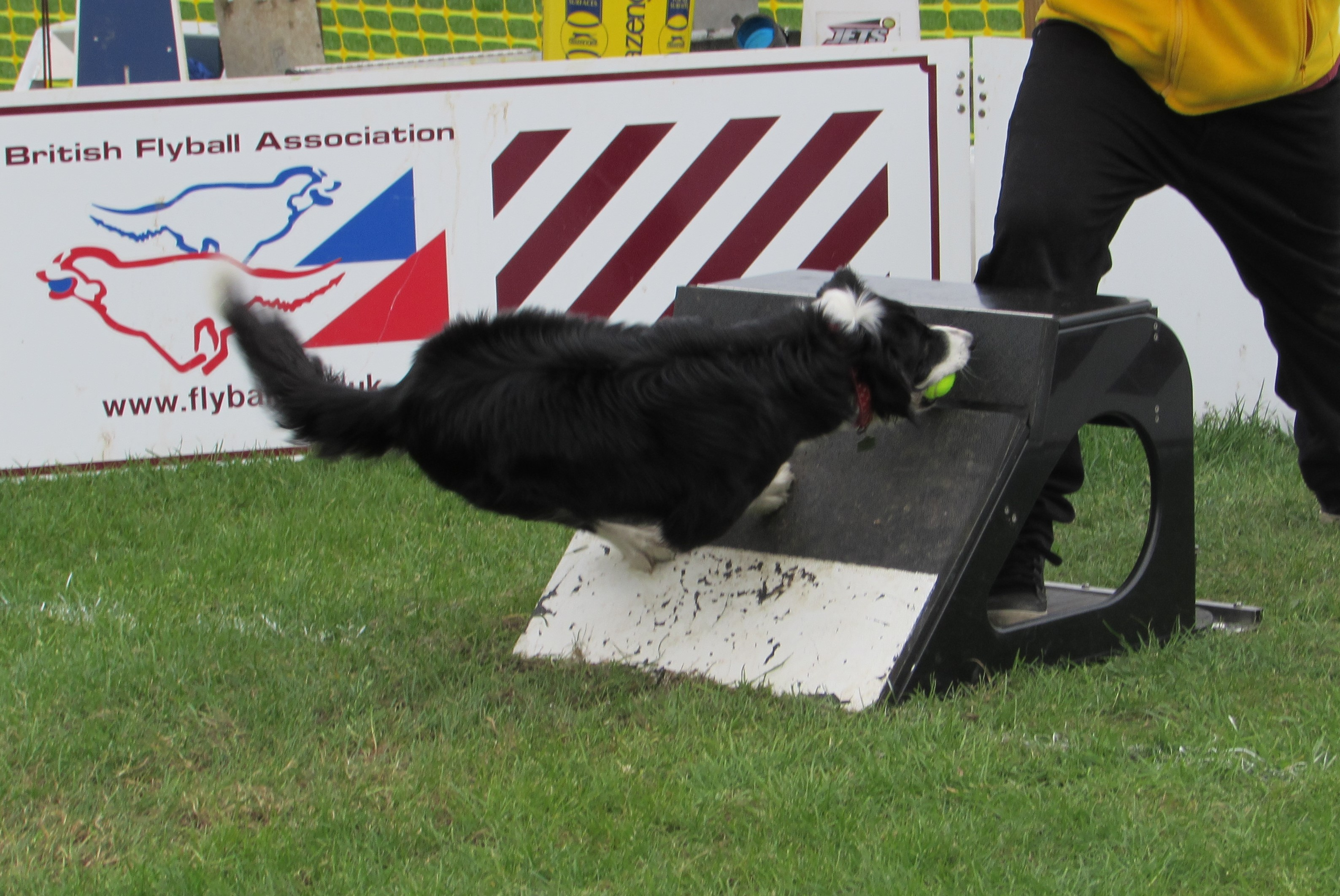
A dog jumps on a box releasing a tennis ball.

Flyball started as a dog sport in the late 1960s and early 1970s in Southern California. Some dog trainers combined scent hurdle racing with the dogs bringing back a tennis ball to the finish line. Then a tennis ball-launching apparatus was added, and the first flyball box was born. Herbert Wagner is credited with making the first real flyball box, and he also demonstrated flyball on The Tonight Show Starring Johnny Carson.

The first flyball tournament was held in 1983 in the United States.

Flyball has now expanded into many countries, including Australia, Canada and South Africa, and in European countries such as Belgium, Czech Republic, Finland, Germany, the Netherlands, Poland, Austria, Hungary, France and the United Kingdom have national flyball tournaments and also hold joint annual European championships.

The European championships, which are the largest international Flyball championships, were held in the United Kingdom in 2007 and 2012, the Czech Republic in 2008; Poland in 2018; Belgium in 2009, 2010 and 2013; Germany in 2011, 2015 and 2019; and France in 2014.

== Nature of the sport ==
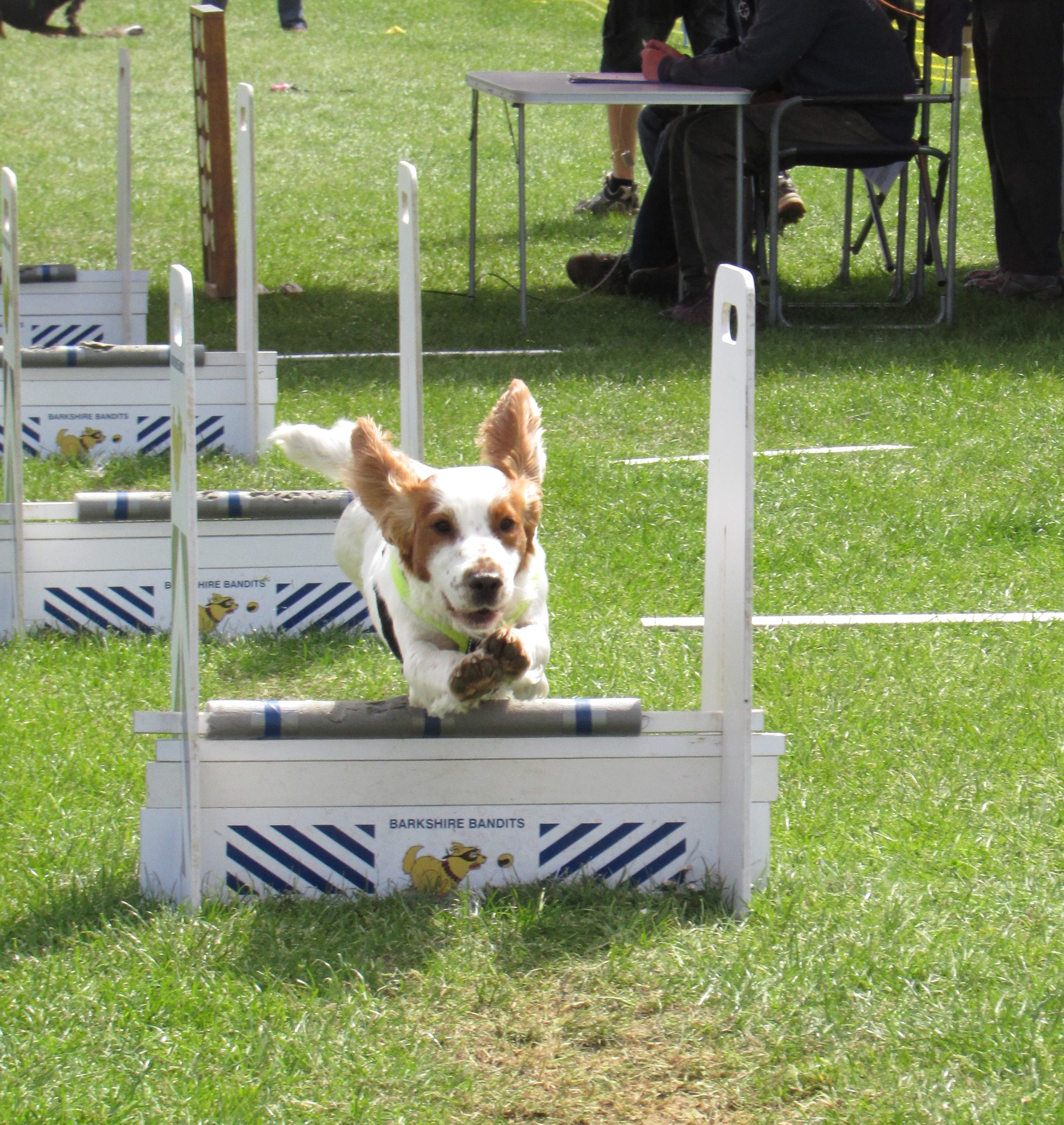
A dog jumps hurdles in an outdoor Flyball competition.

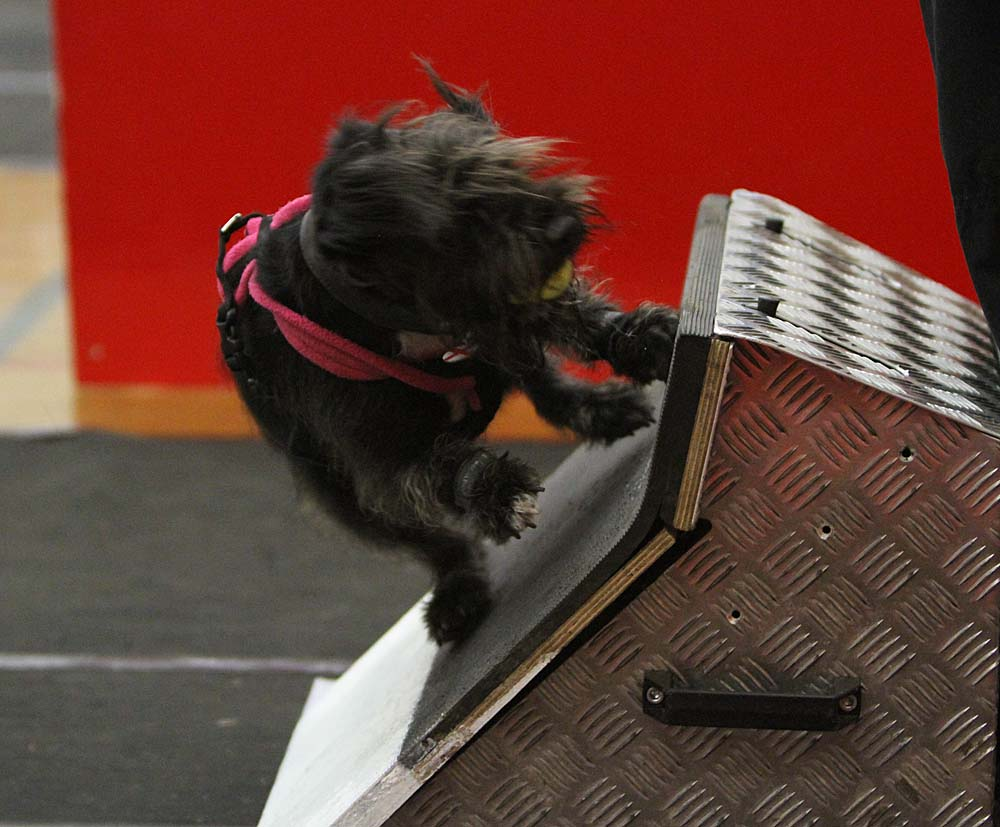
A Patterdale Terrier 'height dog' turning on the box after catching the ball during a race

Flyball provides an active way to interact with one's dog and other dog enthusiasts while allowing the dogs exercise and enjoyment. It is an especially effective way to burn off dogs' energy with a high drive to work, such as Border Collies and Staffordshire Bull Terriers.

A large part of flyball's popularity stems from the fact that it is one of the competition activities available to mixed-breed dogs, allowing rescued mutts and non-pedigree dogs to shine alongside their purebred canine counterparts. Though herding dogs currently dominate the courses, many champion teams have mutts on them. Dogs earn titles and awards based on points earned by their team in racing.

As the sport has developed, better dog training regimes have been introduced as knowledge has increased within the sport. Specific training has been developed to promote the dogs using the 'swimmers' type turns on the Flyball box when catching the ball and turning.

Flyball is not limited to the breed's size, as smaller dogs such as Patterdale Terriers, Jack Russell Terriers, Whippets and even miniature poodles, often compete with great success in mixed-breed teams (teams consisting of dogs of various sizes and breeds). Smaller dogs are often prized as the hurdle height is based on the height of the smallest dog in the team, commonly known as a height dog. Their only limitation is whether they can trigger the release pad, and small dogs often have to fully jump on it to do so.

Flyball is one of the non-hunting dog sports in which dogs and people work as a team. Many casual pet owners use their flyball time more as a way to relax and socialize with other dog owners than as a competition, and many champion flyball dogs are essentially pet dogs with a hobby, rather than dedicated sporting or working dogs. On the other hand, modern flyball has become the fastest-growing team sport, a sport for dogs, handlers and coaches. First division teams have well-trained dogs and handlers and are trained and coached to perform. Some teams use dedicated specially bred sport dogs.

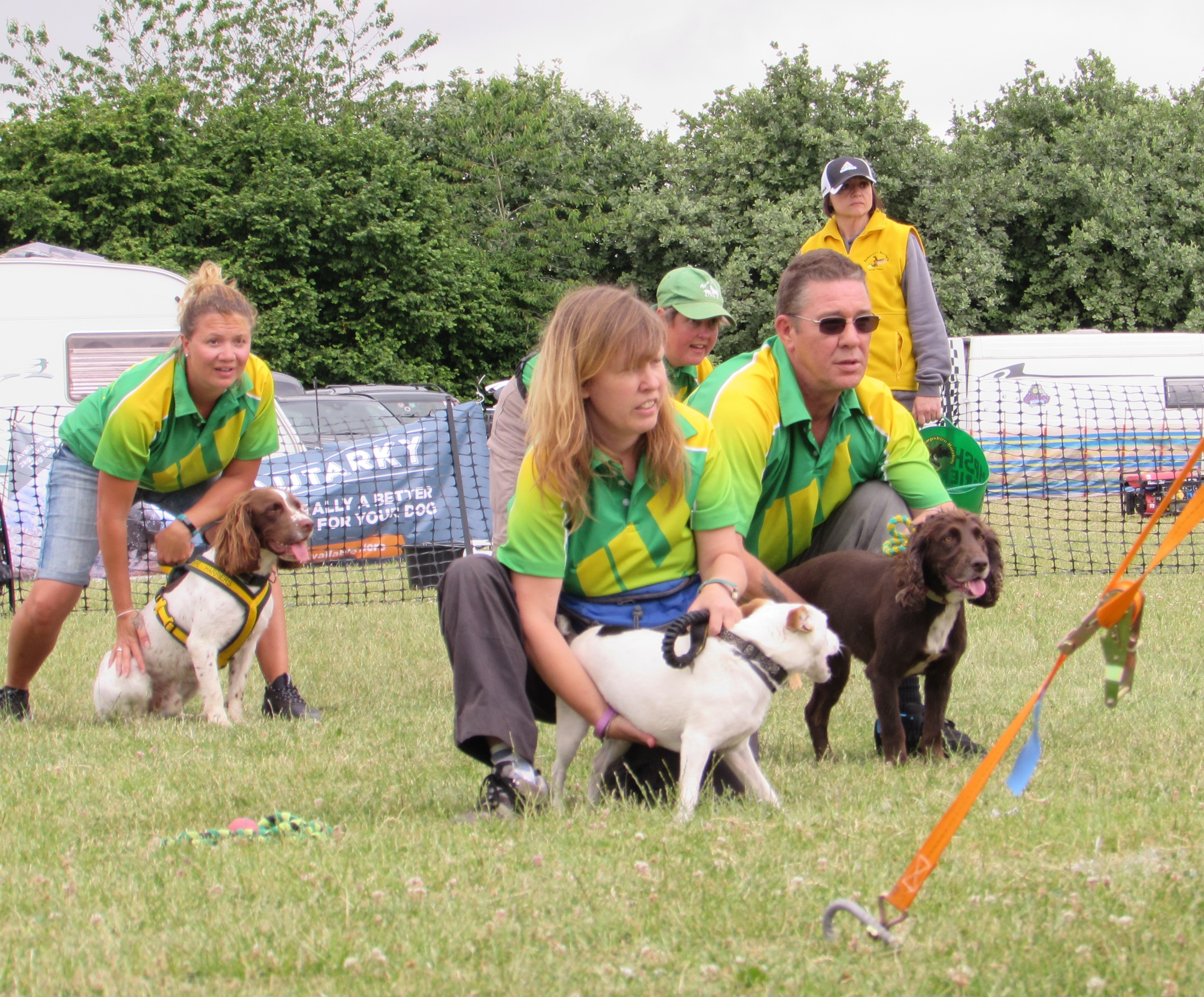
Dogs and handlers lining up to race

== Competitions ==
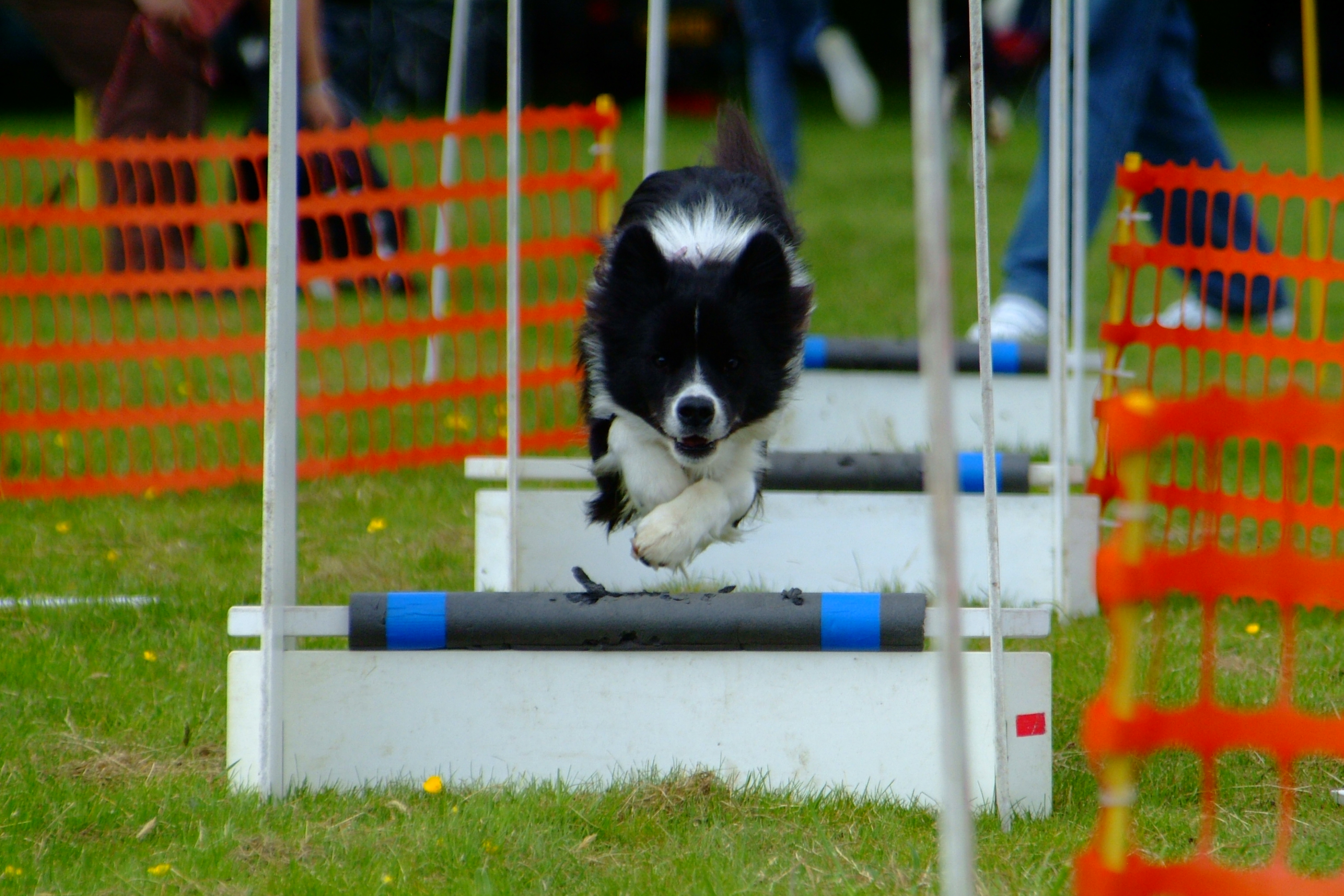
A young dog takes part in a flyball training session. Note the use of netting to stop the dog running out.

Competitions are usually hosted by a specific local flyball club but under the sanction of a national governing body. The host club may be devoted solely to flyball or to many other types of dog sports. The host flyball club uses Head judges who are licensed by the national sanctioning organization and the club will apply to the national sanctioning organization for permission to hold a competition on a specific date or weekend; most competitions are two-day weekend events.

Although competitions may vary, teams are normally seeded into divisions against other teams of similar speed. This allows the races to be closer and much more exciting. Each team in the division will usually race against all the other teams in a round robin format. The overall winner is the team with the most wins in a race.

In competitions all teams will also be trying to improve their own individual team's best race time. Teams that underestimate their speed may "break out" of their division in competition. The break-out time for a division is typically set at 1 second faster than the top seeded team in each division. The break-out rule is intended to encourage teams to seed themselves accurately, as any heats where a team breaks out do not count and are recorded as losses.

The largest single regularly held flyball competition is the North American Flyball Championships which is called the CanAm Classic. In the 2009 Championships there were about 300 teams competing held over a three-day event.

U-Fli hosts their Tournament of Champions at Purina Farms. A slightly smaller scale to NAFA's CanAm Classic, it hosts over 100 teams and runs 3 to 4 rings of races over the course of three days.

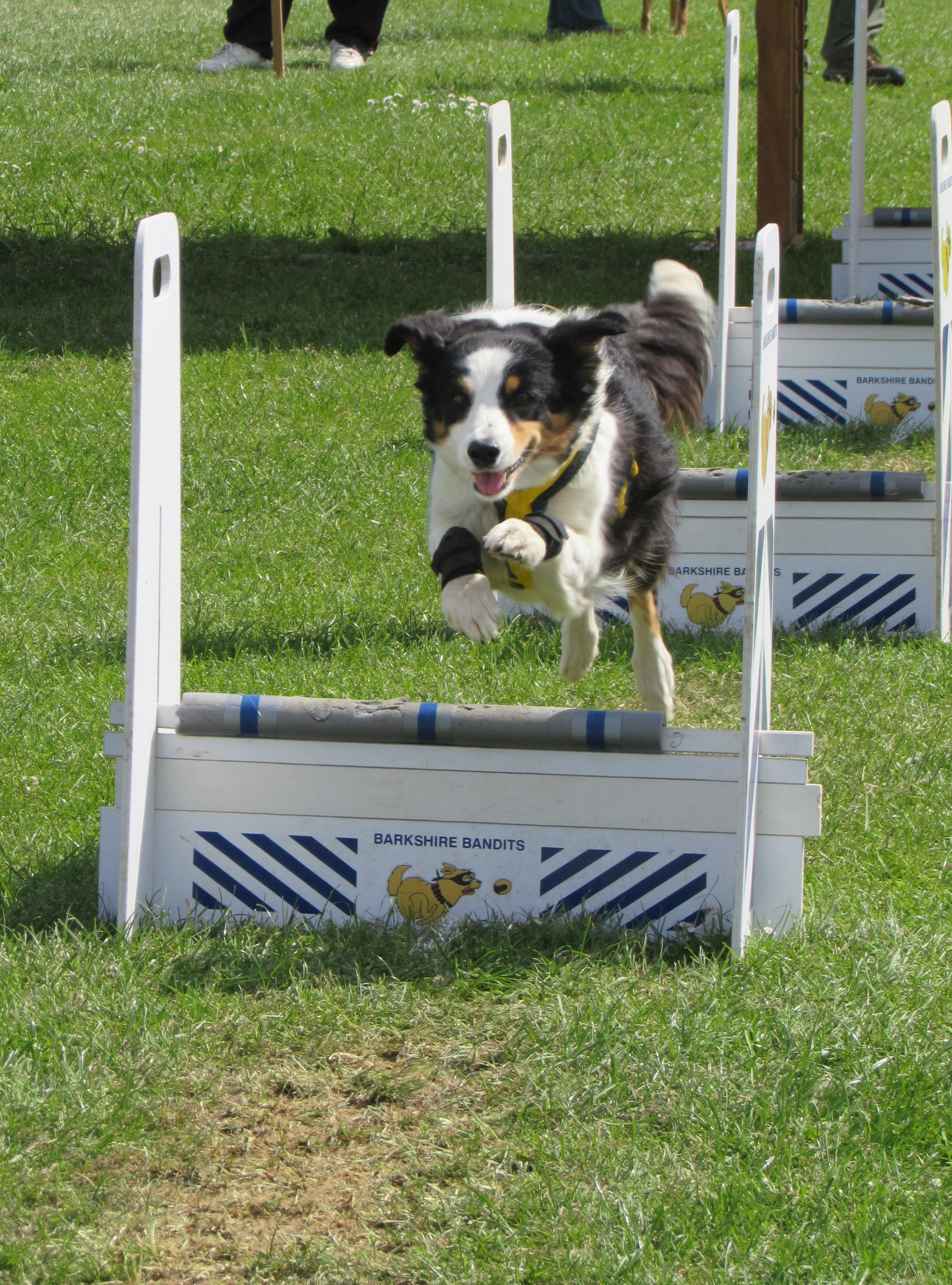
Dog in competition on grass

== Technology ==
While flyball tournaments can be run manually utilizing stopwatches and line judges, electronic systems to facilitate accurate judging are the norm. NAFA refers to their system as the Electronic Judging System. U-FLI refers to their system as the Digital Scoring System.

These systems are similar in nature, with the following primary components: A light tree to indicate the countdown to race start, optical gates positioned at the start/finish line to detect line faults, and a high-precision digital clock to time the race.

=== Pass Calling ===
Flyball teams with fast dogs and tight passes run into the limits of human perception when it comes to accurate estimation of the distance between the dogs when the returning dog passes through the plane of the start/finish line.

Some teams use digital video cameras to record the pass, and then review frame-by-frame to develop an estimate of distance, but the traditional frame rate of 30 frames per second (FPS) can present a problem in that it is unlikely to capture a frame of the exact moment the returning dog breaches the plane of the start/finish line. More recently, high-speed consumer cameras such as the Casio Exilim EX-FH100 have been used to record video at much higher frame rates.

Some teams have started using software designed for other sports, such as the cSwing Golf Analysis tool, to aid in the capture and review of high speed camera footage of flyball passes.

=== Fastest recorded singles time ===
Maybe (owned and trained by Jennifer McAllister of Cedar Rapids, IA) recorded a time of 3.383 seconds at Jefferson, Wisconsin on 21 June 2025. They are with On the Flipside flyball team of Omaha, NE.

Fume (owned and trained by Barbara Bunday) from Paws on the Run flyball team from Leicestershire, UK, recorded a time of 3.40 seconds, recorded at Horseley Fen 31 December 2021.

=== National Record Times ===
Australian

- The current AFA record is 15.987 seconds and is held by Norwest Thunderdogs 1 (set at Canberra show on 26 February 2022). The Norwest Thunderdogs 1 team consisted of Ivy (Australian Kelpie), Link (Koolie), Inferno (Border Collie), and 9 inch height dog Swift (Koolie) .

British

- The current record is 14.17 seconds and is held by Barking 4 Balls (set at a UKFL event at Newark showground 2025)
- The current multi-breed record is held by Tails We Win flyball team who set the record of 15.42 in May 2023
- The current Crufts Flyball record is 14.27 seconds and is held by Roadrunners Beep Beep, set 11 March 2023. They are also the first non-UK team to win the Crufts flyball tournament, and on their first attempt.

Belgian

- The current Belgian record (and current overall world record) is 14.07 seconds and was set by the Roadrunners Flyball Team (now known as the Green Roadrunners Flyball Team) based at Zonhoven. It was set at Jumpers Beezel on 14 April 2024. The lineup Roadrunners Beep Beep attained the record over jump height 27.5 cm with 3 Malinois x Border Collie x Whippet mixes and 1 purebred Whippet. The record was set outdoors at an FCI competition.

Poland

- The current Polish record is 14.84 seconds and is held by Fractal Flyball Team based at Gdańsk. It was set in Gdańsk on 19 September 2021.

EFC

- The current record by European Flyball Championships ruling is 15.31 seconds and is held by Roadrunners flyballteam from Zonhoven, Belgium, and was set at EFC 2018 in Poland. The EFC tournament is an outdoor competition.

North American

- The current U-FLI record is 14.182 seconds and is held by Touch N Go. It was set on 12 April 2014 in Hurricane, Utah.
- The current NAFA Regular record is 14.433 seconds and is held by Border Patrol. It was set on 5 June 2016 in Rockton, Ontario.

== Governing bodies ==
- US and Canada: The first flyball organization, the North American Flyball Association (NAFA), was created to design uniform competition rules and to promote the sport.
- US and Canada: North American Flyball Association (NAFA) United Flyball League International (U-FLI).
- Canada: The main flyball organization is the North American Flyball Association (NAFA).
- United Kingdom. There are three organisations in the UK: The British Flyball Association (BFA) formed in 1994, UK flyball league (UKFL) formed in December 2017 and United Flyball Outdoors (UFO) formed in 2025.
- Australia: The sport is overseen by the Australian Flyball Association (AFA).
- Belgium: The main flyball organization is the Belgische Flyball Belge (BFB).
- South Africa: The main flyball organization is the South African Flyball Dog Association (SAFDA).

== See also ==
- Championship (dog)
- Dog sports
