= Woodland Pytchley Hunt =

Foxhound pack in Northamptonshire

The Woodland Pytchley Hunt is a foxhound pack based in Northamptonshire. The Pytchley Hunt country used to include areas of the Rockingham Forest but was split to form the Woodland Pytchley Hunt.

== Country ==
The Woodland Pytchley hunt country stretches about twenty miles from East to West and eighteen miles from North to South. The furthest point to the North West is Market Harborough. The village of Bulwick is the furthest point to the East, where the country borders the Fitzwilliam and Cottesmore hunts, and Irthlingborough is its furthest point south.

== After the Hunting Act ==
Although "hunting wild mammals with a dog" was made unlawful in England and Wales by the Hunting Act 2004, which came into effect in 2005, a number of exemptions stated in Schedule 1 of the 2004 Act permit some previously unusual forms of hunting wild mammals with dogs to continue, such as "hunting... for the purpose of enabling a bird of prey to hunt the wild mammal".
