= Kimblewick Hunt =

The Kimblewick Hunt was formed in 2002 as the result of an amalgamation of the Vale of Aylesbury with the Garth and South Berks hunts. The hounds are kenneled at Kimblewick, Buckinghamshire; hunt country covers parts of Bedfordshire, Berkshire, Buckinghamshire, Hampshire, Hertfordshire and Oxfordshire. Servants wear yellow livery. Male masters wear traditional hunting scarlet with a yellow collar. Former Conservative Animal Rights Minister Lord Gardiner of Kimble is a member of the hunt and has acted as past Chairman.

The hunt traditionally organises the Easter Saturday point-to-point at Kimble, near Aylesbury, a highlight in the Buckinghamshire social season. Other point-to-points take place during the season at Kingston Blount. The annual Boxing Day hunt has been viewed as controversial, with one spokesperson referring to opposers of the hunt as "kill-joy, anti-hunting bores".

The Kimblewick Hunt has been implicated on two separate occasions for illegally hunting foxes under the smokescreen of trail hunting. The first incident resulted in two convictions after members Ian Parkinson and Mark Vincent pulled a fox from a tunnel via its tail and deliberately released it into the path of a hunt. The second found insufficient evidence of wrongdoing and the investigation was ceased by the Thames Valley Police.
