= Southdown and Eridge Hunt =

British foxhound pack

The Southdown and Eridge Hunt is a United Kingdom foxhound pack, with hunting country within the counties of Sussex and Kent.

== History ==
The Southdown and Eridge Hunt was formed on 1 May 1981 by the merger of the previously autonomous hunts, the Southdown Hunt and the Eridge Hunt.

== Hunt Country ==
The hunt covers country with two distinct territories, which is a result of the merger of the two former hunts. The western country is bordered to the north by the A272 road and to the south by the sea, going as far west at the border of Steyning and including Henfield. At Uckfield, the country extends north, to include Crowborough and Royal Tunbridge Wells and East to the A21.

The hunt's best centres are Albourne, Chailey, Hadlow Down, Lewes and Mark Cross. Its terrain consists of wooded weald, well-fenced vale, and the open downland of the South Downs.

== Pony Club ==
The hunt is linked to three separate branches of The Pony Club, with the Southdown hunt founding a pony club in 1936, but which split in 1976 to form the Southdown Hunt West and Southdown Hunt East Pony Clubs, and the Eridge Hunt establishing a branch in 1935.

== See also ==
- List of fox hunts in the United Kingdom
