= Pytchley Hunt =

Pytchley with Woodland Hunt
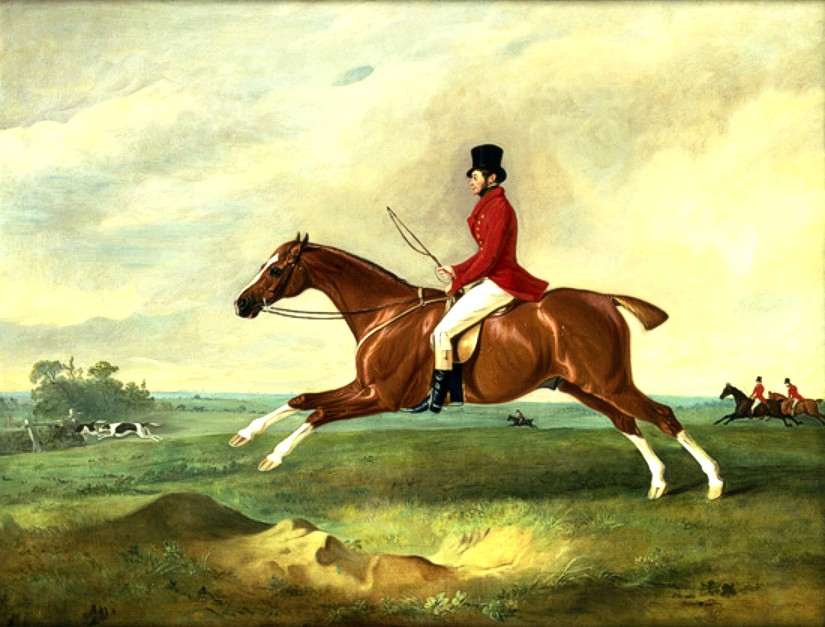
- Portrait of George Payne of Sulby on his chestnut hunter, "The Clipper" with the Pytchley at full cry (c. 1820)
- Hunt type: Trail Hunt

History
- Founded: 1750

Hunt information
- Hound breed: Foxhound
- Hunt country: Northamptonshire
- Kennelled: Near Brixworth
- Website: www.thepytchleyhunt.co.uk/

The Pytchley with Woodland Hunt is a fox hunt formerly based near the Northamptonshire village of Pytchley, but since 1966 has had kennels close to Brixworth. The Pytchley country used to include areas of the Rockingham Forest but was split to form the Woodland Pytchley Hunt. Today, it covers an area of western and central Northamptonshire characterised by rolling hills, hedgerows and small areas of woodland.

== History ==
1635 – a pack at Althorp was well established.

1750 – the Pytchley Club was formed.

1790 – A set of eight hunting prints depicting the great Pytchley hunt, published by the engraver Francis Jukes after Charles Loraine Smith. This set is the only visual record of the hunt led by the celebrated huntsman Dick Knight. At that time there existed a great rivalry between the Quornites and the Pytchley followers. The prints follow the various mishaps and eventual triumph of Dick Knight. Knight used three horses during the course of the run in order to achieve his victory.

1819–1873 – the Althorp and Pytchley countries were hunted by one pack with a second pack established at Brigstock and until 1920 the master of the Pytchley was in charge.

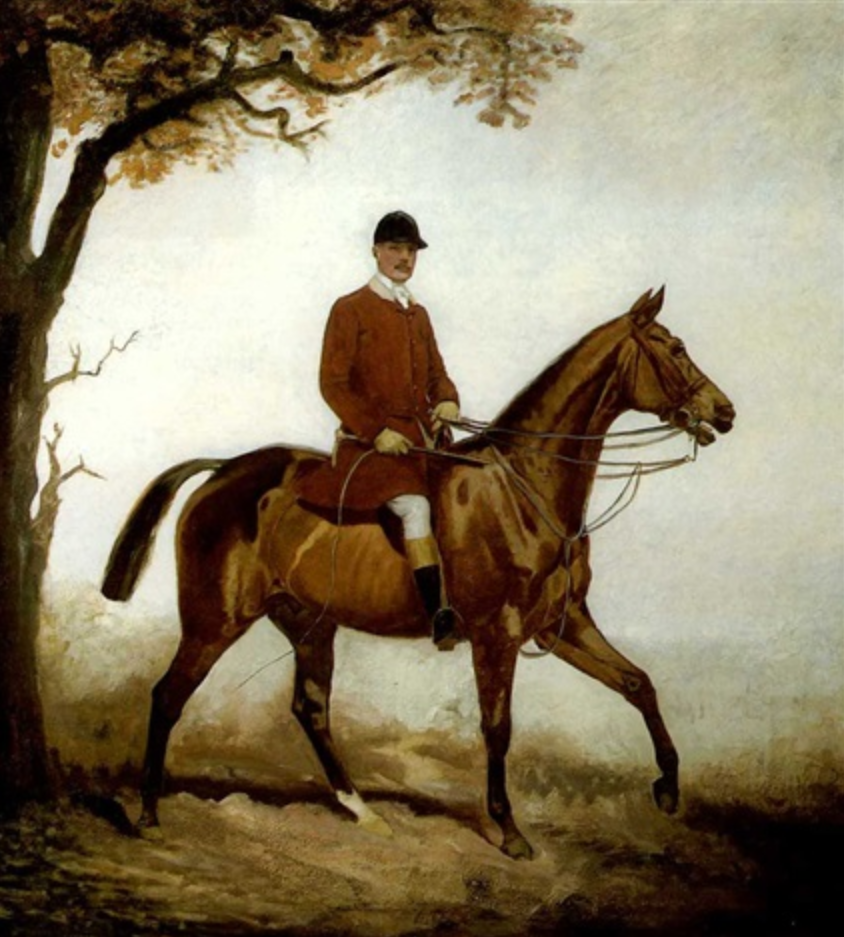
Lord Annaly, Master of the Pytchley Hunt. Portrait of Luke White, 3rd Baron Annaly (1857–1922), Master of the Pytchley Hunt 1902–1914, by Lynwood Palmer (1868-1941)

Early 1900s – The Padua scarlet was officially adopted by hunt staff and masters under Lord Annaly (1857–1922), Master 1902–1914.

1931 – Lord Spencer, Colonel J. Lowther, Mr Samuel Lloyd and Captain Stopford-Sackville drew up an agreement to separate the Woodland Pytchley from the Pytchley.

1966 – The kennels moved from the heart of Brixworth village to the present site. The former kennels in the centre of Brixworth were located on Kennel Terrace.

2005 – Traditional fox hunting is prohibited by the Hunting Act 2004.

== After the Hunting Act ==
Although "hunting wild mammals with a dog" was made unlawful in England and Wales by the Hunting Act 2004, which came into effect in 2005, a number of exemptions stated in Schedule 1 of the 2004 Act permit some previously unusual forms of hunting wild mammals with dogs to continue, such as "hunting... for the purpose of enabling a bird of prey to hunt the wild mammal".
