= South Wold Hunt =

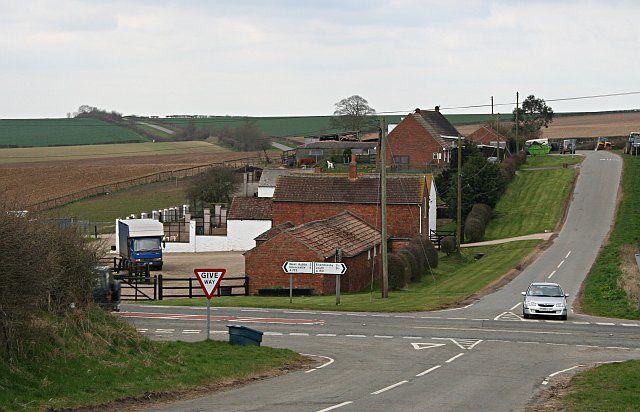
- Southwold Hunt Kennels at Belchford
- Country: England

History
- Founded: 1822
- Parent pack: Brocklesby

Hunt information
- Hound breed: English Foxhound
- Hunt country: Lincolnshire Wolds
- Kennelled: Belchford
- Website: www.southwoldhunt.co.uk

The South Wold Hunt is a registered foxhound pack based in the village of Belchford, Lincolnshire, England. Its hunt country centres on the Lincolnshire Wolds, and adjoins that of the Blankney, Brocklesby and Burton Hunts.

The Hunt became known as the South Wold in 1822. The first Master of Foxhounds was Hon. George Pelham who took office in 1823 – Pelham was brother to the 1st Earl of Yarborough. Hounds have been kennelled in Belchford since 1857. South Wold became subject to a Hunting Act of Parliament in 2004.

The Hunt's Point-to-Point race is held annually at Revesby Park and its related activities include the Pony club branches of South Wold Hunt North and South.

South Wold Hunt gave its name to a type II hunt class destroyer - HMS Southwold.

South Wold Hunt
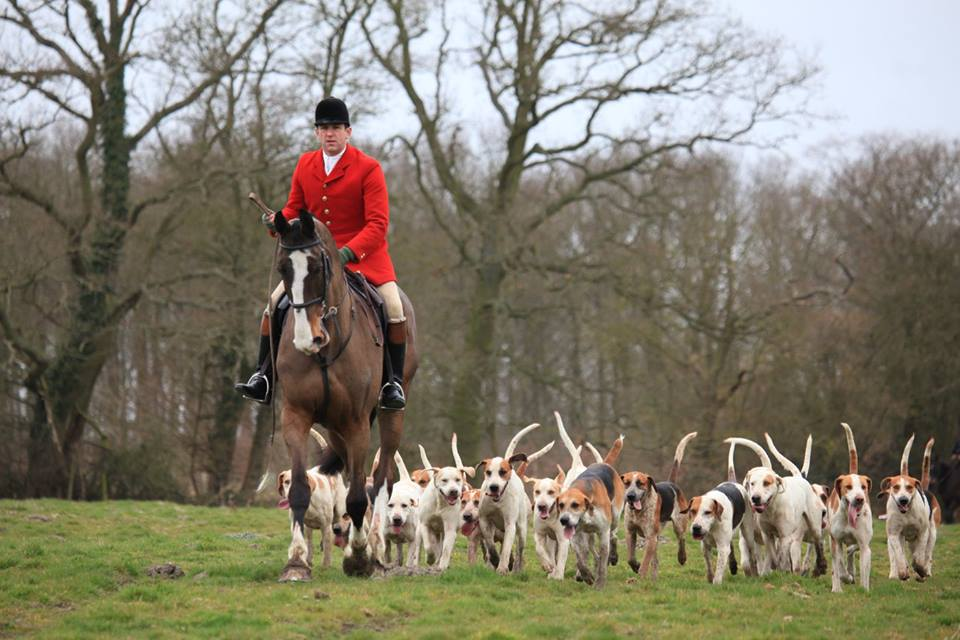
South Wold Hunt

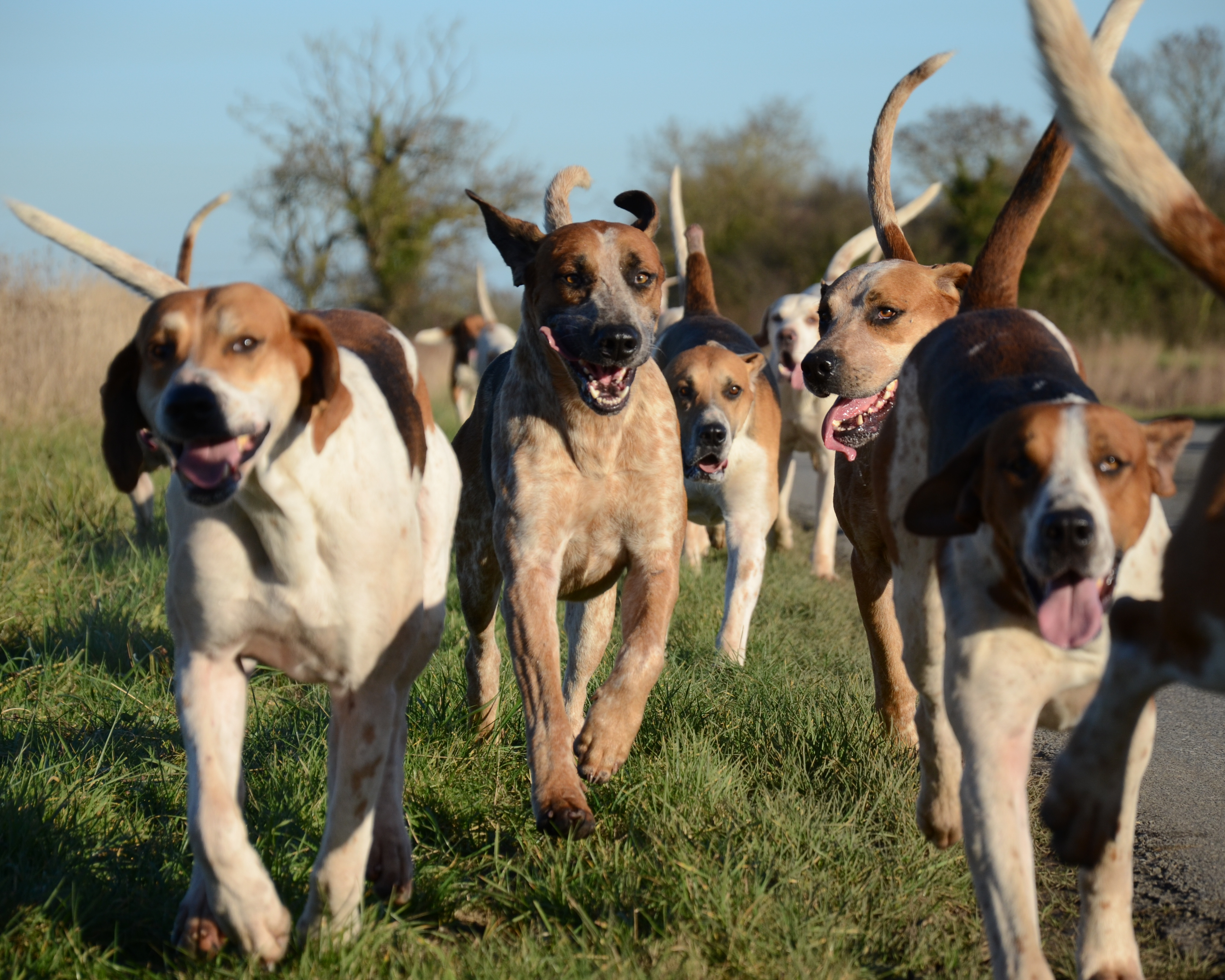
South Wold Hunt - English Foxhound pack
