= Hunting the clean boot =

Dog sport

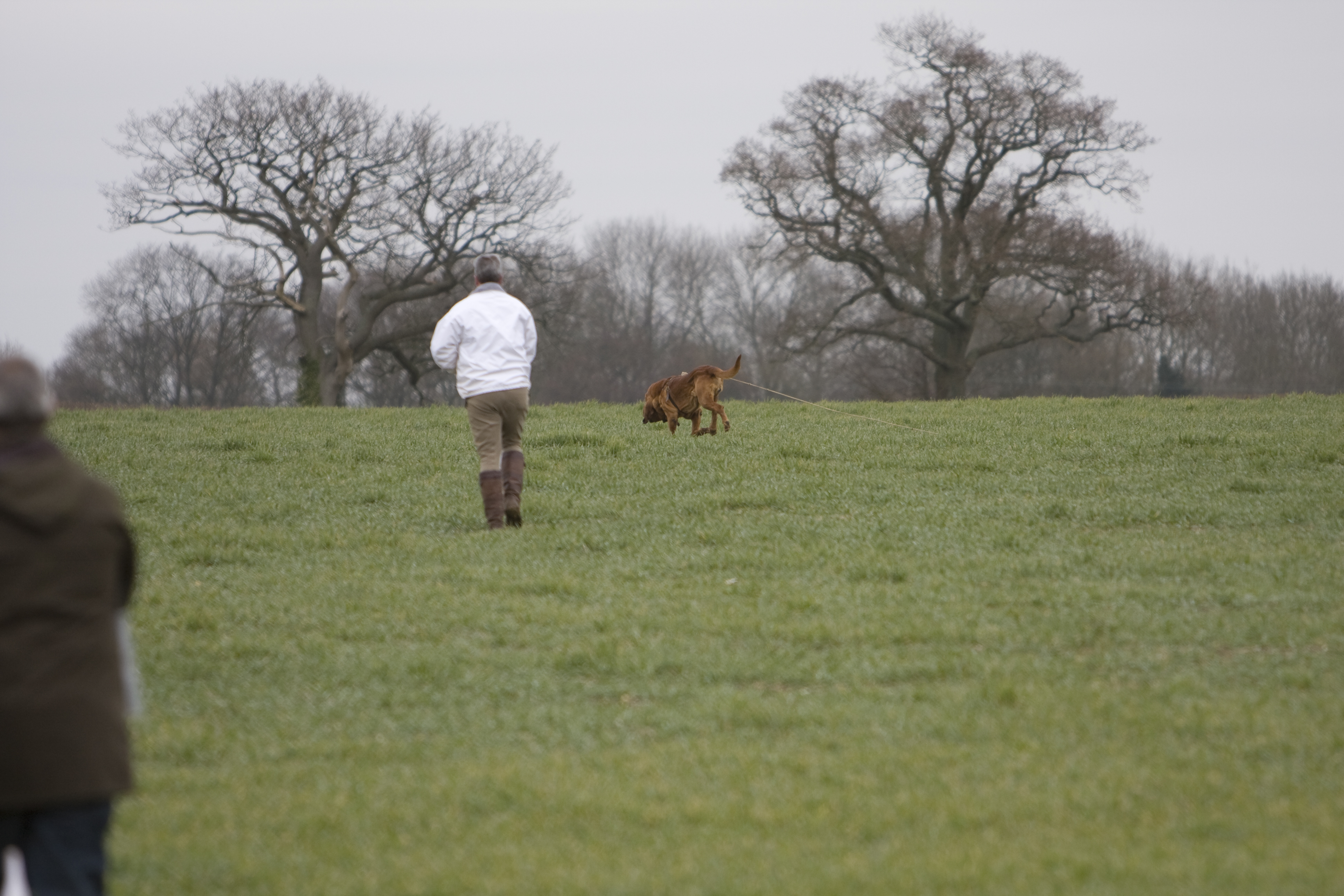
The Bloodhound Club Trials, Senior Stake, Alton, c.2008

Hunting the clean boot, also called clean boot hunting, is a term that has been used in the United Kingdom to refer to the use of packs of bloodhounds to follow a natural human scent trail.

The term 'clean boot' refers to the absence of either an artificial scent such as aniseed, as used in drag hunting, or animal urine, as used in trail hunting. Whilst today the term has become synonymous with the use of bloodhound packs, most breeds of dog can be taught the skill individually with varying degrees of success.

Typically, clean boot hunts are run along similar lines to fox hunting (now prohibited in Great Britain), with a field of mounted riders following a pack of bloodhounds which trails the scent of a runner. Like other forms of mounted hunting with hounds, hunting the clean boot usually occurs in the autumn, winter and early spring.

Clean boot packs are purpose-bred and need different abilities than the bloodhounds who work as leash hounds for law enforcement and search & rescue teams. In order to improve the speed, agility, biddability and pack hunting instincts of the bloodhound, foxhounds such as the Dumfriesshire Hound were used by several packs as an outcross.

== See also ==
- Trail hunting
- Drag hunting
