= Trail hunting =

Form of hunting with hounds

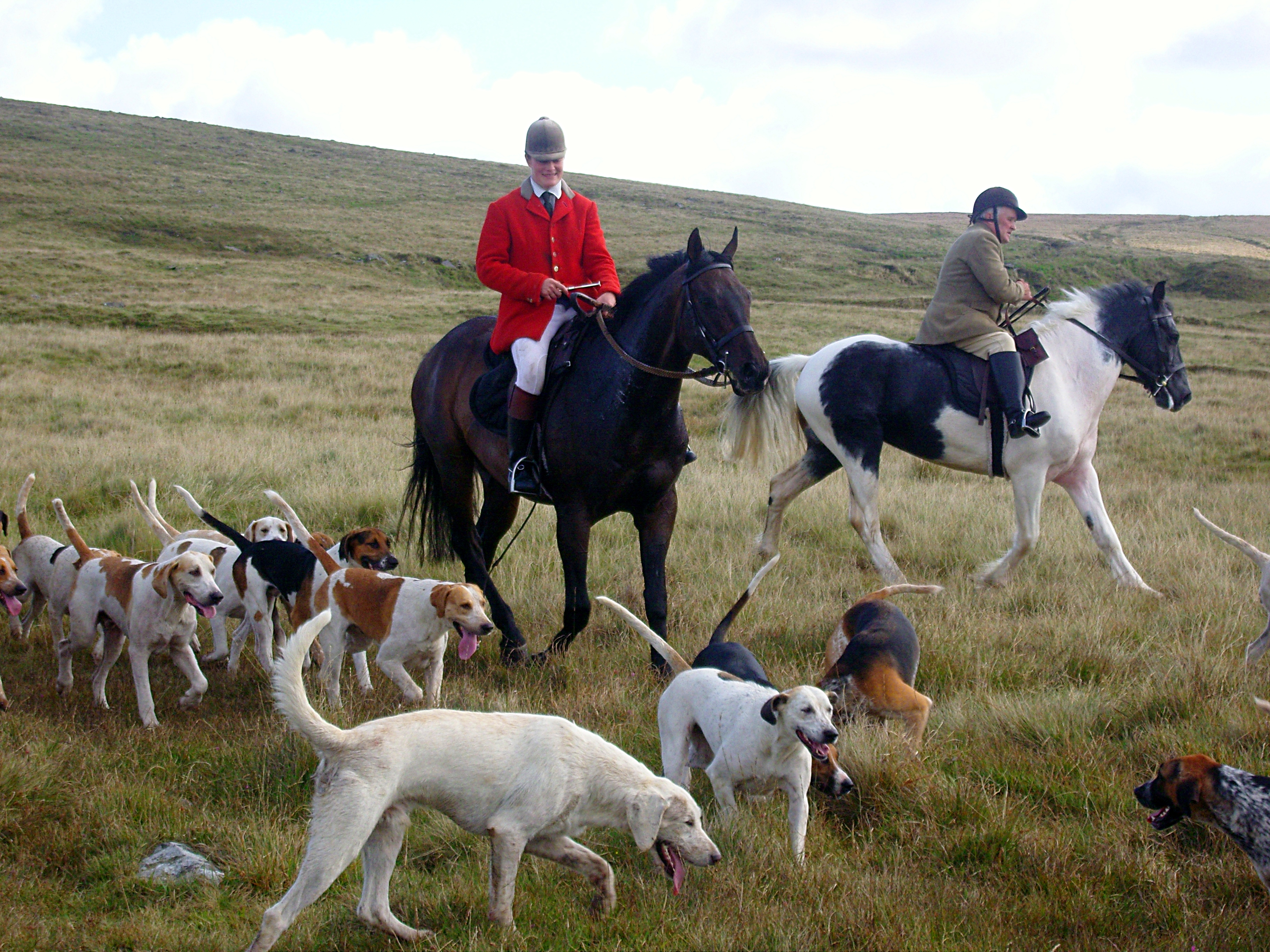
Trail hunting in Dartmoor

Trail hunting is a legal, although controversial, activity in Great Britain in which hounds follow an artificially placed scent trail, rather than hunting live animals. A trail of animal urine, most commonly from a fox, is laid in advance, and is subsequently followed by a pack of hounds and accompanying followers on foot, horseback, or both.

== Background ==
By 2005, most forms of hunting animals with hounds had been made illegal across Great Britain, although many remain legal in Northern Ireland. To preserve their traditional practices, most registered hunts switched to trail hunting as a legal alternative to hunting animals with hounds.

Trail hunting, while superficially similar to the established sport of drag hunting, was an entirely new invention in 2005 and one which hunts claim is designed to replicate the practice of hunting as closely as possible, but without the deliberate involvement of live prey.

== Description ==
In trail hunting, a scent trail is laid using the prey animal's urine (foxes, hares, or other animals) and deliberately laid in areas where those animals naturally occur, ostensibly to recreate the experience of chasing a real animal. The trail does not follow a pre-determined course and those controlling the hounds do not know the route in advance.

It is distinct from drag hunting, where hounds follow an artificial scent, usually aniseed.

== Controversy ==
Animal-welfare and anti-hunting organisations argue that trail hunting is a smokescreen for illegal hunting and a means of circumventing the Hunting Act 2004, which applies in England and Wales, and the Protection of Wild Mammals (Scotland) Act 2002, which applies in Scotland.

Critics also state that because the trail is laid using animal urine, and in areas where such animals naturally occur, hounds may pick up the scent of live animals, occasionally resulting in live animals being pursued and killed.

Some organizations further allege that artificial trails are not consistently laid. The League Against Cruel Sports has claimed that, during its monitoring of approximately 4,000 hunts, a possible trail was observed being laid in around 3% of cases. The Malvern Hills Trust, which banned trail hunting on its land in 2021, stated that during its observation of ten hunts, a trail was seen being laid on only one occasion.

== Existing bans ==
In recent years several major landowners including the National Trust and Natural Resources Wales have banned trail hunting on their land.

== Proposed ban in England & Wales ==
In December 2024, Keir Starmer's Labour government affirmed its commitment to ban trail hunting in England & Wales. In response, supporters of trail hunting called the proposed ban "completely unjustified" and an "act of spite".

In December 2025, Keir Starmer's Labour government published a new animal welfare strategy that would ban trail hunting in England & Wales. The government said trail hunting is being used as a "smokescreen" for the hunting of wild animals.

Opponents of the proposed ban argue that trail hunting is a lawful countryside activity with cultural significance that contributes to rural economies. They contend that greater enforcement of existing laws, rather than an outright ban, would address illegal activity without penalising those who comply with the rules.

== Related sports ==
=== Drag hunting ===
Hounds follow an artificial scent, usually aniseed, laid along a set route which is already known to the huntsmen.

=== Hound trailing ===
Similar to drag hunting, but in the form of a race, usually around 10 miles (16 km) in length. Unlike other forms of hunting, the hounds are not followed by humans.

=== Clean boot hunting ===
Clean boot hunting uses packs of bloodhounds to follow the natural trail of a human's scent.

== See also ==
- Fox hunting
- Drag hunting
- Clean boot hunting
- Protection of Wild Mammals (Scotland) Act 2002
- Hunting Act 2004
- Opposition to hunting
