= The Duke of Wellington at Pau, France =

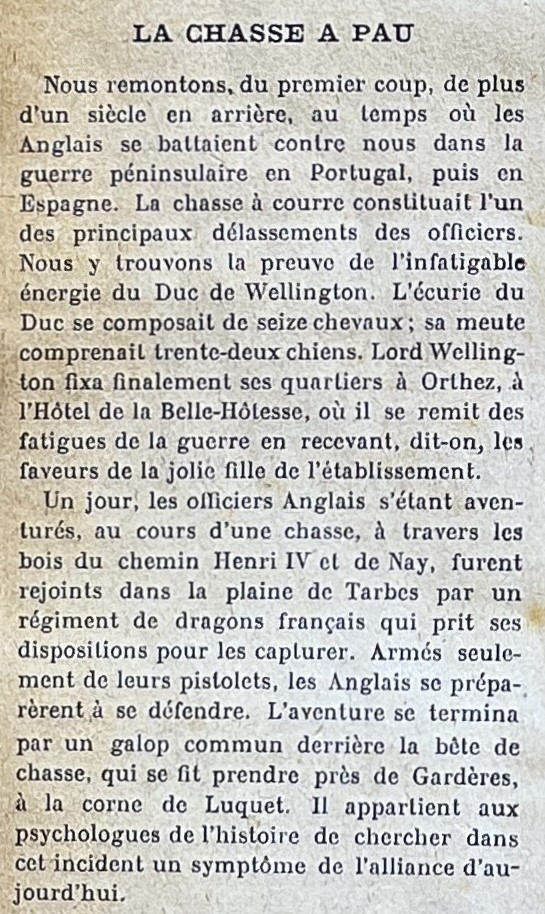
First public publication of the legend of Wellington at Pau in 1917 by Arthur Smyth Este (in French)

The legend of the Duke of Wellington at Pau, France, first appeared in a 1907 publication coinciding with the 65th anniversary of the founding of the Pau Hunt, and quickly developed into a tale about the origins of Fox hunting in Béarn. After the Peninsular War, Wellington spent just one night at Pau, May 18, 1814, stopping on the route from Toulouse to Madrid. The tale of a more lengthy and marked presence developed 90 years later as a prank that regular winter colonists played on newcomers. The tale found its way into touristic marketing publications, memoires and academic publications during challenging times. Despite contradictory historical evidence, it has developed into Bearnese folklore. Worldwide, is difficult to find any 21st century historical passage about the 19th century "English" tourist colony at Pau that does not present this legend.

== Wellington in the Southwest of France ==
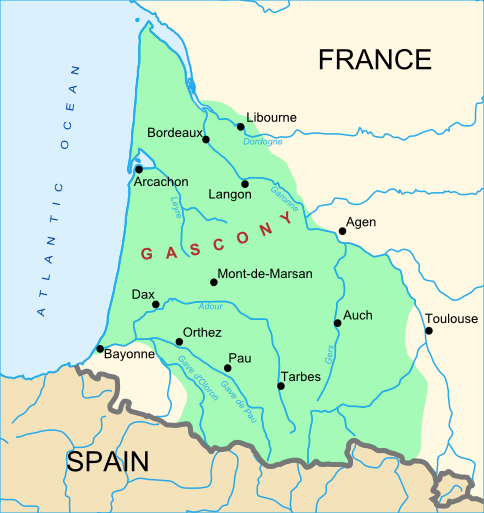
Southwest France, where the Battle of Orthez continued directly north up towards the Adour, with the final Peninsular campaign following the Adour to Tarbes, before ending with the battle of Toulouse.

During the Peninsular War, 45,000 British, Spanish and Portuguese infantry and cavalry wintered in the Basque Country awaiting provisions and preparing what they intended to be the final campaign to rout Marshal Soult's troops from the Iberian Peninsula. Near and around the port of Saint-Jean-de-Luz, some officers, including Wellington hunted foxes and hares - a perfect sport for cavalry training. Soult's troops held east of the Bidouze river, from Saint-Jean-Pied-de-Port, northwest to the port of Bayonne, with Soult's headquarters at Peyrehorade. Between February 14 and February 18, Wellington's forces pushed Soult's behind the Gave d'Oloron permitting General Hope to siege the port of Bayonne by February 25. Two days later Wellington was wounded during the Battle of Orthez, spending the night there while the battle continued until dusk driving Soult's defense north to Sault-de-Navailles. Wellington, who couldn't ride and was down with a fever, established his headquarters at Saint Sever on March 1. Headquarter baggage arrived on March 4 directly from Saint-Jean-de-Luz, including legal and administrative staff, 1,200 animals, spouses, guests, prisoners and Wellington's famous pack of hounds, where they remained until the bridge over the Adour river was repaired. On March 7 from Saint-Sever, two divisions crossed the Adour to liberate Bordeaux and another was sent under General Henry Fane to liberate Pau. Both Bordeaux and Pau welcomed a possible Bourbon Restoration and were easily secured. Fane delivered Wellington's proclamation making Pau's town council responsible for its own security, leaving British troops able to rejoin the campaign. Wellington installed his headquarters at Aire-sur-l'Adour on March 10, where he remained until March 17 awaiting Spanish reinforcements, and the return of a division from Bordeaux along with additional provisions. At Aire-sur-l'Adour, Wellington's hounds first went out on March 12, but it is uncertain whether he had recovered well enough to go out with them that day. One month after the Battle of Toulouse, British troops began leaving Toulouse for embarkment at the port of Bordeaux while Wellington left on a diplomatic mission to Madrid, passing through and spending one night at Pau, where "Milord" was welcomed on May 18, 1814 as a hero.

== The Legend(s) of Wellington ==
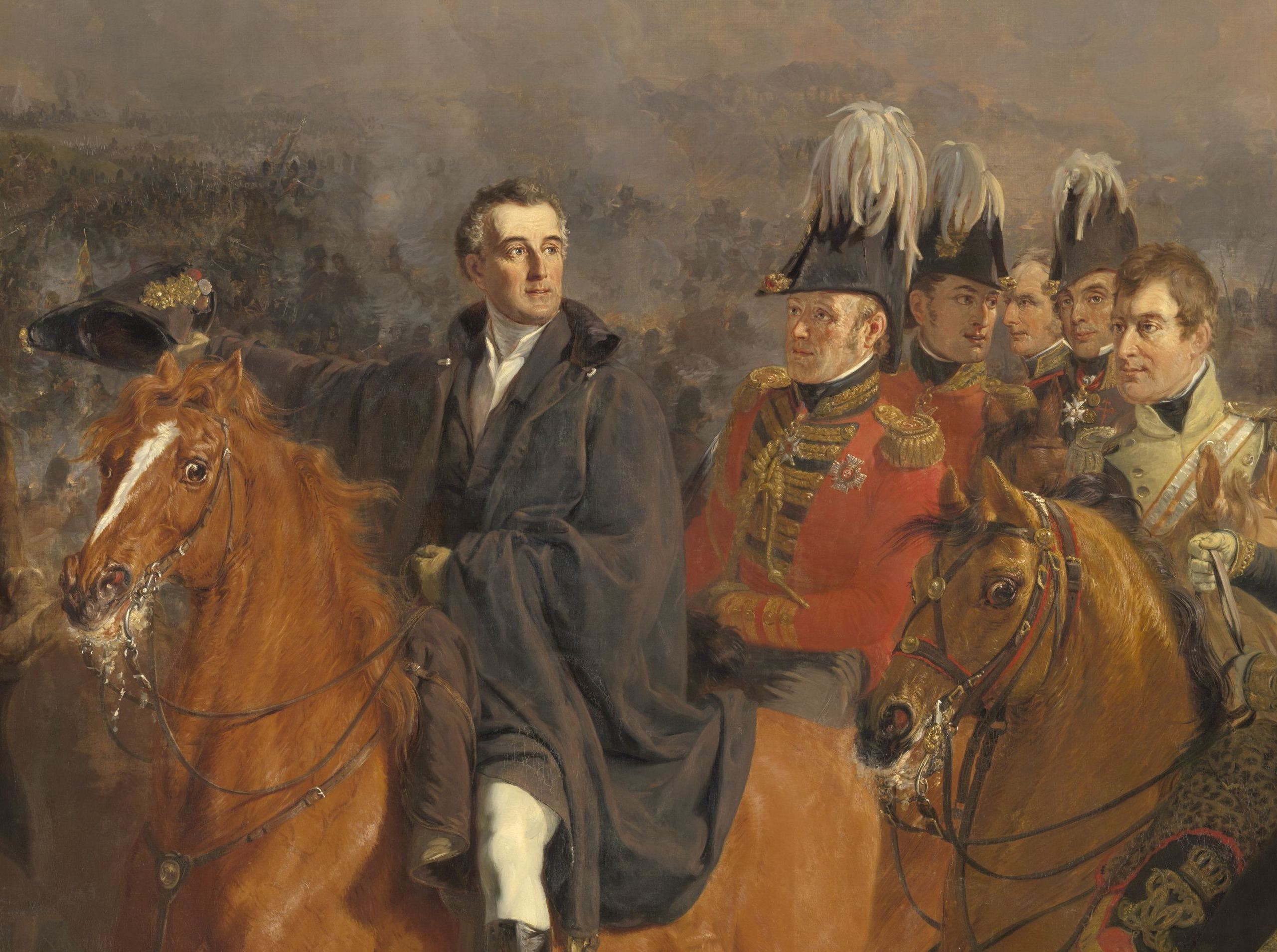
Promotional materials created the legend that the Duke of Wellington was Pau's first master of the hounds, along with claims British officers hunted with enemy dragoons in the Pau Hunt Field in 1814.

The legend of Wellington has several variations - one with Wellington regularly playing checkers with Napoleon's soldiers in a local valley. The most prevalent early versions recount Wellington having established his headquarters along with his stables and pack of hounds at Orthez where, while hunting, the general was ambushed by French hussars and defended himself with a pistol. Again from Orthez, there is a version claiming Wellington sent cavalry out to chase off French cavalry for a distance of 43 miles (65 km), returning to report they had discovered what would become the Pau Hunt country. Other legend versions add British and French officers cordially parting ways ending their skirmish with a foxhunt. The English language version takes a turn, naming Wellington Pau's first Master of the Hounds, while the French version goes on to name some early Pau Hunt founders as returning officers; although, those named were not yet of age in 1814 and the founders mentioned never served in the military. Later legend versions state Wellington's 1814 Scottish military had hit some balls around along the Gave de Pau to explain the presence of the Pau Golf Club in 1856, and have the same generational discrepancy: the eldest Pau Golf Club founder, General William Nelson Hutchinson (1803-1895) turned eleven in 1814. (Note: Early development efforts targeted the Billère plain, where the Pau Golf Club is located, as the most suitable location for the hippodrome, finally built in 1842 at Pont-Long.) In 1956, historian Raymond Ritter shuns the development of the legend in an article celebrating the 100th anniversary of the Pau Golf Club:

We would like to say the Pau-Billère course has fabulous origins. One might believe a tenacious legend attributing the first trace of the golf course to Scottish officers of Wellington's army while garrisoned in Pau in 1814. It's a tall tale. In reality, allied forces did not occupy Pau. [...]

== 20th century origin and versions of the legend ==
=== 1907, Charles de Salverte ===
Near the opening of hunt season in November, the local tourist newspaper normally published the history of the Pau Hunt with few or slight variations from year to year. There is no mention of Wellington or his soldiers contributing to the development of sport or tourism at Pau in any 19th century document. An article edited by J. Aparici de Valparda on November 27, 1892, is cited in Lord Howth's "Leicestershire in France or the Field at Pau", translated into French by Charles de Salverte, who wrote using the pseudonym, "Thya Hillaud". The second part of this 1907 500-copy limited edition by Charles de Salverte, "Les P.H. Modernes sous le mastership de C.H. Ridgway esq." includes the first known version of the legend:

In 1815 [sic], Wellington, during the three months that the English army camped in the Bordeaux region, with his headquarters at Orthez, hunted with his pack that never left him. It was there that a historical painting, depicted an adventure of the English general caught in an ambush and defending himself with a pistol against French hussars, who had interrupted his hunt. (Note: The army was British. Wellington was an Irish subject of the British Crown.)

=== 1912, Harry Worcester Smith, Master of the Grafton Hounds ===
In a memoire, "A Sporting Tour through Ireland, England, Wales and France", dated 1925, Harry Worcester Smith reminisces about "Hunting in France", or more specifically at Pau in 1912. Smith recounts one morning with his host, Frederick Henry Prince:

After giving a few stable orders, allotting me for the morning's run the best of the string, we got into the motor and took a run out through the valley into the defiles of the mighty Pyrenees, where the soldiers of Napoleon used to file back and forth while they were playing checkers with Wellington, during the War of the Peninsular.[...] All manner of fun was made of the American who could neither understand nor talk French, and many times I thought the translations given me by young Prince were far from the truth, for the ladies would often break out in gay laughter at my remarks. (Note: "Playing checkers" may have been a play on words or meant as an idiom for the underestimation of a more formidable opponent. Regardless, Wellington was never near the foothills south of Pau.)

=== c 1912, Baron Robert Lejeune, former Master of the Pau Hounds ===
An annex to the Pau Hunt 1928 - 1939 archives includes translated notes of a speech given by Baron Lejeune. The date is unknown; however, it is after the end of the 1888 - 1908 tenure of Henri Faisans as mayor of Pau and probably before the publication the 1917 publication of Arthur Smyth Este, not mentioned in the address:

But I hope someone will mention that I was the first Frenchman to be honored with the mastership, and I preserve, precisely the numerous testimonials I received from the Town, the Mayors (then Faisans) and the followers of the Hunt; medals, hunting-horns, silver etc. Of course, it is to me invaluable. But all the appreciation I received from the county people are vivid still in my souvenir – d'Este succeeded me, but ever since, no Frenchman has been chosen. The best time of my life lay there – I was so encouraged by really true friends. Years ago, I wrote an article in the "Field" on the discovery of the Pau hunting Country by Wellington's Cavalry officers – it was thus: From Orthez – Wellington sent a party of his cavalry to give chase to some French Cavalry from Tarbes, who were in quite a small number, they took flight and the Englishmen pursued them further than they had been told to, and it brought them in what they thought to be a magnificent hunting country – between Pau & Tarbes. They reported it to Wellington and that was the "découverte" des pays de chasse par les Anglais – then the peace was signed, they did not forget it. The first English pack to come back was kenneled at the Château de Gardères & so on – et voilà où nous en sommes. (Note: Currently no article by Lejeune in The Field has been located in their archives) (Note: The hunt at Tarbes and at Pau hunted near Gardères, but neither the kennels nor any MFH (Note: MFH is the abbreviation for Master of the Fox Hounds) ever lodged there.)

=== 1917, Arthur Smyth Este, aka Baron d'Este, former Master of the Pau Hounds ===
Pau had few visitors during World War I. Many permanent residents left along with the tourist colony that sacrificed several of its dedicated regulars in the war. Este, who maintained a scrapbook related to horse racing, the Pau Hunt and its subscribers between 1860 and 1920, had several articles about the history of the Pau Hunt including the de Valparda article from 1892. Este was the president of the English Club at the time the 1917 publication. His version of the legend of Wellington seems to be a blend between the de Salverte and the Lejeune versions. The Este versions adds the number of hunters and hounds, flirtations with the young bride of the hotel owner, the chemin de Henri IV and the town of Nay. (Note: The Henry IV road or chemin runs between Bizanos and Lourdes. The town of Nay is located between the two.) The following is a translation of the text added as a preamble to the Valparda article and published in 1917:

Firstly, we must go back a full century, when the English fought against us during the Peninsular War in Portugal. Fox-Hunting then was the chief diversion of the officers. The Duke of Wellington's stable consisted of 16 hunters; his pack was 32 hounds strong. The Duke's quarters were finally fixed at Orthez at the Belle Hôtesse inn, where he rested after the war and received, they say, the favors of the pretty girl of the establishment. One day, while the adventurous officers, in the course of a hunt, had crossed through Henry IV road and Nay, they were overtaken in the Tarbes plain by a detachment from a regiment of French dragoons, who, at once, took their positions to capture them. Armed solely with their pistols, the English prepared to defend themselves. The adventure ended with a collective gallop behind the fox who got himself caught near the village of Gardères, at the Luquet-Horn of the wood. (Note: Este's 1917 declaration linking the Pau Hunt to Wellington contradicts his own from an 1899 article, "The Pau Hunt, you remember, was founded in 1840 and was directed for thirty years by English and American Masters.")

=== 1930, Desbois, Pau-Hunt ===
A typed, 21 page document entitled, "Pau-Hunt" signed January 18, 1930, by Desbois is located in at the Communal Archives of Pau, this time taking place in November:

Orthez, former capital of Béarn, small town next to the river, 10 leagues from Pau, is occupied by English troops. Their commander, the Duke of Wellington, lives at the Belle Hotesse inn, a gracious 18th century mansion. Before the door, this November morning, three English thoroughbreds await saddled for the hunt. Here, Sir the Duke; mounts with some of his officers and rides off to join the pack composed of 32 hounds, who are waiting at the city gates not far from the Moncade tour where Gaston Phoebus killed his son. His huntsman advises they hunt foxes in direction of Pau.

Desbois confuses Master Charles Whyte with his the military brother Col. White - neither of whom have been identified. He does not make a connection between Wellington and Col. Whyte or Sir Oxenden.

In 1840, Colonel White [sic] and Sir Henry Oxenden and Mr. Cornwall, founded the hunt that exists today...

=== 1930, H.E. Gay ===
An article with the legend of Wellington appeared in the European Edition of The Chicago Tribune on April 11, 1930, "Pau : Final Hunt Race Attracts Society to Turf at Pau", eliminating flirtations at the hotel, stating Wellington's stables included race horses, changing the town of Nay to "May Heath" and replacing hussars with dragoons:

In conclusion, let us quote some interesting remarks written by Baron d'Este on this subject: Fox-Hunting at Pau! We must go back a full century, at the time of the Peninsular War. Fox-Hunting then was the chief diversion of the officers. The Duke of Wellington's racing stable consisted of 16 hunters; his pack was 32 hounds strong. The Duke's quarters were finally fixed at Orthez at the Belle Hôtesse inn. One day, when a party of English officers in the course of a hunt, had followed through the Henry IV wood and May Heath, they were overtaken by a detachment from a regiment of French dragoons, who, at once, took their positions to capture them... But, the adventure ended in a mixed gallop behind the fox who got himself caught near the village of Gardères, at the Luquet-Horn of the wood.

=== 1930s, Baily's Hunting Directory ===
The 1930s annual editions published the following in its listing from the Pau Hunt:

Former Masters: The Duke of Wellington, 1814. Then a lapse of twenty-six years and Sir Henry Oxenden hunted from 1840[...]

=== 1932, Viscount Henri Piscatory de Vaufreland, Secretary of the Pau Hunt ===
Texte from an article Foxhunting and horse racing in Bearn appeared in the 1932-33 Revue de Béarn N° 6, Academie de Béarn. The Battle of Orthez is not mentioned.:

Wrapped in his blue frock coat, wearing a gray cap, "The Iron Duke" gallops behind the tails of his "Foxhounds" 1814! The Duke of Wellington brought to Orthez the pack he had brought to Spain to relax himself and his officers from the hard work of war. Between two battles: Bayonne and Toulouse, he stayed at the inn of "La Belle Hôtesse", whose beautiful eyes did not leave him indifferent, and pursued the fox through fields of gorse and ferns, woods and banks. One day, English officers were running through the woods of the Chemin Henri IV and were pursued by a detachment of French hussars on reconnaissance. Everyone was preparing to fight, but sporting took hold, meaning the adventure ended with a collective gallop and the capture of the hunted animal at "La Corne de Luquet". It is up to the psychologists of history to look for in this a precursory reason for the cordiale accord; we find there, in any case, the preface to the extraordinary development of the sport of "Fox Hunting" that is essentially English and has taken hold, in Bearn, a land so French.

=== 1935 and 1937, Col. T. Bentley Mott ===
Col. T. Bentley Mott twice published identical texts of the legend of Wellington in descriptions of the Pau Hunt. The first was an article, published in Country Life magazine in January 1935, "With Frederick Prince at Pau" and the second a chapter of his memoir, Twenty Years as a Military Attaché, with the heading "The Duke of Wellington M.F.H.". The Mott version places the British hunting between Orthez and Pau in January 1814 - behind enemy lines - when the French still held east of the Bidouze river:

One Blustering day in January, 1814, the Duke of Wellington's pack was pursuing a fox between Pau and Orthez. The English and Irish officers who composed the hunt had reached the highway that leads to Nay, when some French hussars out on patrol discovered them and at once made dispositions to capture the lot. But as the chase drew near, the French officer in command suddenly jumped his horse into a field and went off after hounds. Others joined him, and so it came about that instead of trying to sabre each other, all of them, British and French alike, settled down to a good run. When the fox was killed, everybody saluted, the British rode back to Orthez and the French toward Tarbes.

=== November 1964, W.E. Armstrong, The Field Magazine ===
Armstrong's article, A Corner of a Foreign Field, presents Pau as an English hunt with the first paragraph falsely excluding non-British subscribers from the 1886 hunt under MFH Sir Victor Brooke. (Note: The Armstrong article erroneously identifies American Mrs. Daniel Torrance née Sophia Johnson Vanderbilt (1825-1912) as English. Mrs. Torrance purchased a farm (Domaine Jacob) in January 1890 and donated it in April 1890 to the municipality of Pau with the funds for the construction of permanent kennels in memory of her son Alfred Torrance (1852-1887).) Armstrong's version of the legend states the Pau Hunt was a legacy of war after the battle of Toulouse, implying British cavalry fox hunted near Orthez, citing a foxhunt in the journal of Lieutenant George Woodberry; however, Woodberry did not foxhunt near Orthez. His journal entry dated May 14, 1814 recounts a hunt at Lisse 80 miles (128 km) from Orthez.

=== 1965 and 1970, Joseph Duloum ===
A 1965 article on the origins of the British colony at Pau stated half-pay soldiers from Wellington's 1814 campaign returned to the region. Duloum cited three publications, noting they were not based on historical documents, but tradition and legend. The article then describes a well-documented British colony installed at Pau between 1835 and 1840 during the First Carlist War composed of some soldiers and families of the British Auxiliary Legion, diplomats and businessmen. Those at Pau were out of harms way from the uprising in the adjoining Basque Country or used Pau to access a relatively safe alternative war-time route to Madrid using the Somport pass. Duloum does not repeat the legend of Wellington in his 1970 dissertation, "Les Anglaise dans les Pyrénées et les Débuts du Tourisme Pyrénéen (1736 – 1896)", but recounts a peaceful securing of Pau by General Sir Henry Fane with one infantry battalion arriving early in the morning of May 7, 1814 and departing the 9th and 10 May.

=== 1976, Pierre Tucoo-Chala ===
In an article published in a local historical revue, "Pau in 1841-1843, description of a tourist town by two Englishwomen", respected historian Tucoo-Chala, presents and compares the works of two authors; Sarah Stickney Ellis and Louisa Stuart Costello. Early in the article, he wrote a fleeting reference to Wellington in the Pyrenees linked to an album of lithographs published by William Oliver, who was born in 1804. Tucoo-Chala implied that Oliver dedicated the album to Wellington, however, the dedication was by his publishers and the reason is unknown. In his observations of the two authors' works, Tucoo-Chala states that retired soldiers had been at Pau; however, the works of Ellis and Costello make no mention of active or retired British soldiers, but only of French military stationed at the Pau castle. Ellis (page 275) states that afflicted (French) soldiers could have the baths administered gratis. Tucoo-Chala's subsequent publications never again attempt to link Wellington with tourism at Pau.

=== 1977, Georges Claverie, Master of the Pau Drag Hounds ===
After World War II, the Pau Hunt was reconstituted as La Société d'Encouragement Pau Hunt Drags concentrating their focus on drag hunting. Master Claverie submitted an article to Le Vénerie N° 45, "The Pau Hunt Drag Hunt": his version stating Wellington's armies had bivouacked near Pau where officers had fox hunted. The Claverie version also pretends that two of the officers who returned; Colonel White [sic] and Sir Henry Chudleigh Oxenden, founded the Pau Hunt Drags - the name of the association - and inadvertently implying they may have drag hunted, but the first recorded drag hunt at Pau didn't occur until 1847 under Master Jasper Hall Livingston. Claverie may have read about Whyte and Oxenden in the 1930 Desbois document. Master Charles Whyte's brother Colonel Whyte brother was active in 1847 and probably too young to have hunted in the region in 1814. (Note: Oxenden was at Eton until 1816 and never in the military, but did hold a position as lieutenant of the Kent County Militia from 1820.)
