= Frederick Prince =

Frederick Prince may refer to:

- Frederick O. Prince (1818–1899), American lawyer, politician, and mayor of Boston, Massachusetts
- Frederick H. Prince (1859–1953), his son, American stockbroker, investment banker and financier
