= James Erskine Murray =

Scottish lawyer

James Erskine Murray (1810–1844) was a lawyer, author, and adventurer in Borneo.

Born as James Murray, seventh son of Baron Elibank, by his second wife, Erskine was inserted into his name on marrying Isabella Erskine, a granddaughter of Lord Alva, in 1832. He became a lawyer at the Scottish bar and wrote an early travel journal of the French Pyrenees. He wintered at Pau during the 1834–1835 season, hunting both at Pau, Tarbes (both later consolidated becoming the Pau Hunt) and in the Pyrenees. From Pau he travelled by diligence to Toulouse and then on to Perpignan. He returned on foot documenting and sketching various Pyrenean cultures, customs, dialects and legends. Murray published an article about wolf hunting in the Landes, where villagers hunted using stilts due to sandy soil. He took his family, including two sons, two daughters and a younger brother, Robert Dundas Murray, to Port Phillip, Australia, in 1841.

Early in 1843 he left Port Philip, ostensibly to trade, and headed for Hong Kong. There, he sold one ship, Warlock, and bought a 90-ton schooner, Young (or Yonge) Queen, and a 200-ton brig, Anna, and set off to establish a settlement in Eastern Borneo. The two ships entered the Mahakam River (then called Kutai) early in 1844 and sailed up to Tenggarong where he consulted the local Sultan. The situation turned ugly and the ships sailed under fire, in the course of which Murray was killed, but the ships escaped. A survivor, Captain Hart, and others provided the details for an account by the younger brother of George Gliddon, William A. Gliddon, describing how the Rajah of Sarawak had rebuffed a proposal by Murray to join his enterprise; how Murray had arrived at Coti with his ships; how the Sultan had agreed to trade, but declined to allow Murray to settle; and how he had been compelled to retreat under fire.

The story was later written up from the account of another survivor by W Cave Thomas and has been studied in the context of the development of the Dutch East Indies, provoking the Dutch to oblige the Sultan to sign a treaty acknowledging their overall sovereignty over Kutei in 1845, and of the British involvement in Borneo.
