= Pau Hunt =

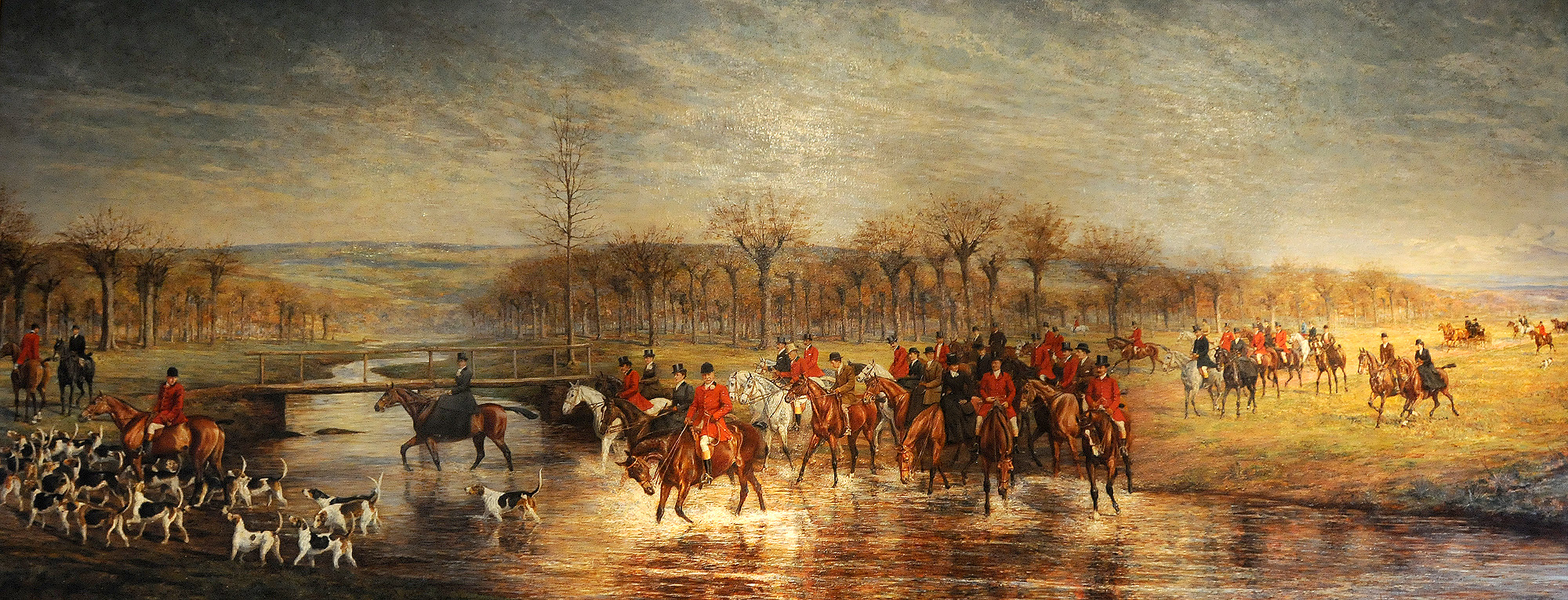
Allen Culpepper Sealy, 1850 - 1927, The Pau Hunt (65th Anniversary), Master Charles Henry Ridgway, 1907

The Pau Hunt was established in 1842 by the Société d’Encouragement as a spectacle for tourists authorized by the government of Louis Philippe to hunt predatory animals such as wolves and foxes. Dominated by American and British Masters, it was one of the most renowned and glamorous hunts until the breakout of World War II. Its field, between Gardères and the hills surrounding Pau was nicknamed “Leicestershire in France”.

Innovative hunt masters and committee members organized the capture of game and its later release (bagmen), (Note: A bagged fox or bagman refers to a captured fox to be released for a meet) Their first recorded drag hunt was in 1847. Cross country and point-to-point events later called The Hunter’s Stakes and finally Pau Hunt Races were first held in the mid-1840s, closing the season for over 90 years. A plethora of private photos, articles, publications, photos and works of art during its heyday are housed in private collections, including the collection of the English Club of Pau. (Note: An article published in The Field in 2015 erroneously imples the English Club was founded by members of the Pau Hunt, including Sir Henry Chudleigh Oxenden, who lived at Tarbes between 1837 and 1842. The English Club was initially founded in 1828 and later again founded in 1856 as an English language reading room and library - with just two of twenty-four founders confirmed as subscribers to the Pau Hunt. Oxenden who lived a days' ride from Pau never appears to have had any lien with the English Club.)

In 1947 the association reorganized as the "Pau Hunt Drags", (Note: Registered as the Société d'Encouragement Pau Hunt Drags, located at the Berlanne Kennels, Siren 78232147500017, Siret 782321475) and continues its tradition of drag hunting.

== History ==
=== The Hunt at Tarbes (1832-1842) ===
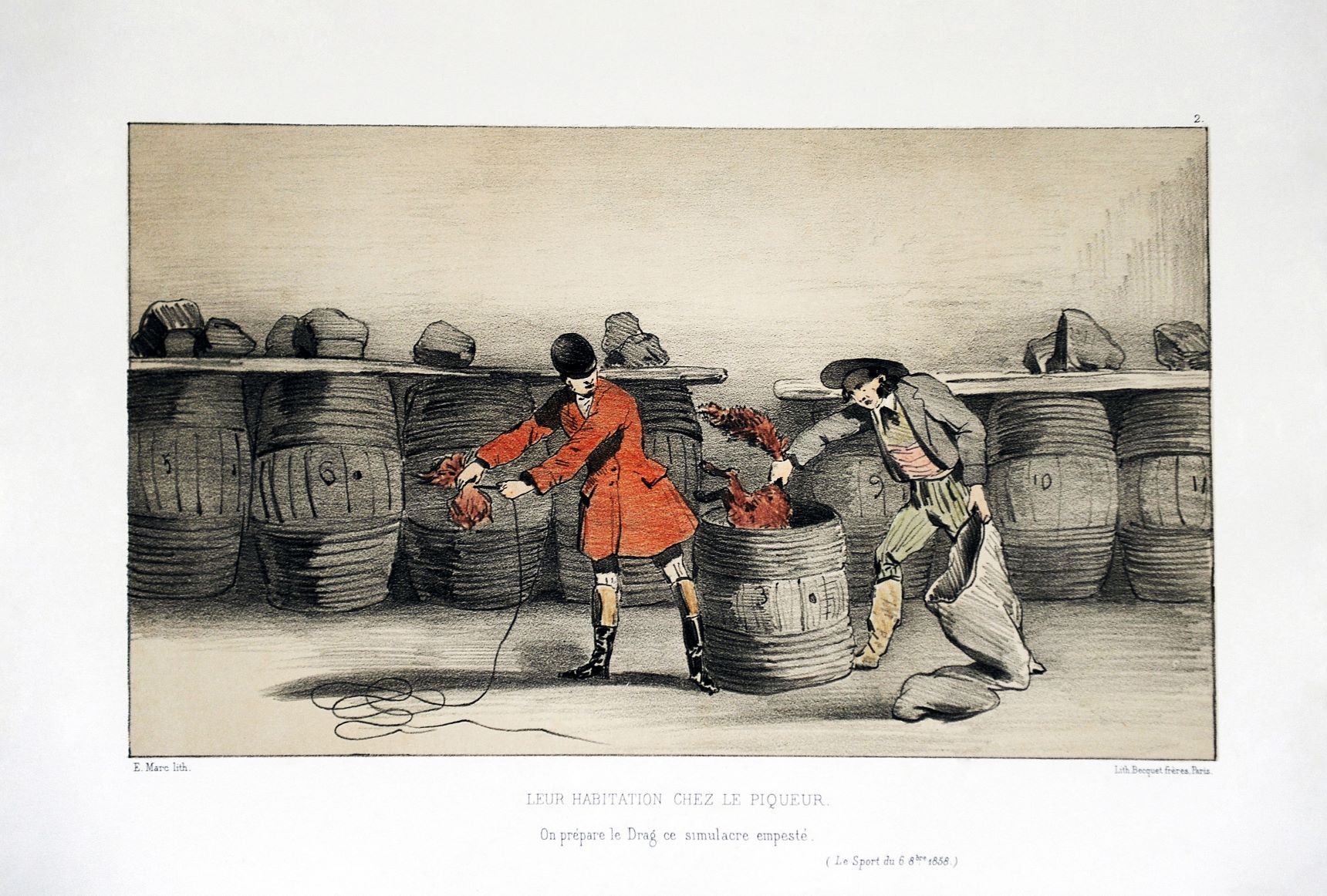
Pierre-Eugène Marc (1819-885), "Leur Habitation Chez Le Piqueur", 1860, Pau Huntsman Dupont with a bagman in 1858.

Under the license of Royal Wolfcatcher, Mister Dupont invited Pau's British winter colonists, including hunter and explorer James Erskine Murray in 1835, to lodge at Tarbes, hunt in the mornings and dining in the evening. Dupont was attentive to his hounds, managed clean kennels and preferred hunting wolves and hare - avoided fox hunting, fearing the ruin of his hounds' noses. His nephew and huntsman at Tarbes, also named Dupont, continued serving as huntsman for the Pau Hunt until at least 1858.

There was a separate Béarnais hunt at Pau in 1835 that Murray described unfavorably. Its country was strictly limited to one forest (le forêt domaniale de Bastard) - and corresponds with a royal patent dated 1771; however, no documents have been found that certify the 1771 and 1835 hunts were the same. (Note: Murray published an article in 1839 about wolf hunting in the adjacent Landes, using loud instruments such as drums and cymbals to drive predatory animals from the woods and towards awaiting hunters, similar to the royal patent's description of the hunt at Pau in 1771. Villagers from the Landes hunted on stilts due to sandy soil.) Murray had not been familiar with the Béarnais method of capture and release that would be adopted by later Pau Hunt masters, sometimes criticized as unorthodox and "American" forty years later. (Note: Lord Howth considered the use of bagged foxes unorthodox and referred to this method as "American". The Béarnais hunt at Pau in 1835, used bagmen and rifles.)

In 1837 Sir Henry Chudleigh Oxenden began wintering at Tarbes where he leased Aureilhan Castle in 1839 after his father's death. (Note: Confusion exists between Sir Henry Chudleigh Oxenden (1795-1889) and his father Sir Henry Oxenden 1756-1838) (See Oxenden Baronets.). The elder was Master of the East Kent Hunt from 1814-1828 and a confident to the Duke of Wellington. The son, Henry Chudleigh Oxenden was in the same Eton College class as Wellington's nephew, Henry Wellesley in 1811.) He imported hunters and hounds for fox hunting around Tarbes and Lannemezan. J. Cornwell hunted with him. (Note: This individual is still unknown to us. His name is Sometimes written as Cornwall, Cornewell or Corneall.) (Note: The Valparda article is a rewrite of a staff article that appeared as early as 1886 in a local tourist weekly.) Oxenden returned to Broome Park in the summer of 1841 due to financial difficulties, and in late autumn 1842, sold his horses to M. Larienty and offered his fox hound pack to his French and British friends at Pau. (Note: One legend claims that after the death of Lady Oxenden he ordered his horses be killed, fed to the pack and then the pack be killed. The first version of this rumor appears in the Valparda article (without a source) stating Oxenden had ordered two horses killed. Lady Oxenden (née Charlotte Brown) died in March 1843 after their departure in 1842. At least one of those two horses "Malle Poste" was ridden in matches in 1846.) (Note: Oxenden was confined to debtors prison in 1847.)

=== The Hunt at Pau (1842–1848) ===
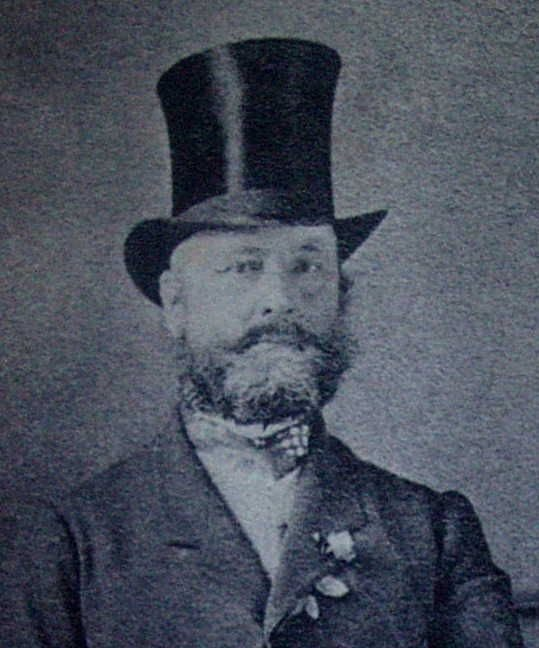
Jasper Hall Livingstone was accredited with saving the Hunt in 1847.

After Oxenden gifted his pack to friends at Pau, the local newspaper, dated 3 December 1842 announced the authorization to hunt predatory wolves and foxes by the Société d'Encouragement, with at least 14 foxes hunted during the first season 1842-1843. (Note: The 1848 Craven's magazine article names Oxenden as the hunt's founder. Historian Joseph Duloum determined 1842 as the date for the founding of the Pau Hunt, separating it from the one at Tarbes. Additionally, Duloum notes he saw the "Masters of the Pau Hounds" plaque at the English Club, ignored the erroneous years "1840-1847" and replaced them with a partial list of masters that corresponds somewhat with Valparda's 1892 article. Taylor's July 1842 publication stated the hunt was at Tarbes, while its 1843 French translation added the pack had been given to Oxenden's "French and British friends at Pau".) Cornwell hunted with MFHs Lt. O’Shirley, Roussel, Charles Whyte, Pery Standish and William Cecil Standish. (Note: MFH - Master of the Fox Hounds) In 1845, keeping just one of Oxenden's hounds "Fallacy because she had a good nose", Pery Standish brought in a new pack of hounds to newly built kennels in today's village of Soumoulou. The season ended with the first recorded cross country and steeplechase matches on 31 March 1846.

Jasper Hall Livingston was accredited with saving the hunt by purchasing the Standish pack upon the brothers' departure. (Note: Howth stated the Standish brothers had left Pau abruptly because of a lack of foxes; however, it is about the same time Pery Standish inherited Farley Castle.) MFH Livingston, joined by his nephew Charles Carroll Livingston, held their first recorded Drag Hunt at Pau on Saturday, November 26, 1847 on the Route de Tarbes between Pau and Gardères making a distance of 21 km (13 miles) in one hour: a welcomed diversion before the meet.

Before the steam engine, train service and automobiles, innovative sports were developed to increase speed and skill levels of both horses and riders. Many of these techniques are no longer used due to animal rights and property issues. At Pau, the government sanctioned Société d'Encouragement awarded cash prizes at the racetrack (hippodrome) that was inaugurated in 1843 as an incentive for private breeders to improve the health, speed and endurance qualities of the horse, which were the primary mode of transportation of humans and goods and indispensable for national defense.

=== Revolution (1848) ===
No hunt was held at Pau. Jasper Hall Livingston hunted boar at Roux Castle and lost most of his hounds.

=== Development of the Hunt at Pau (1849–1875) ===
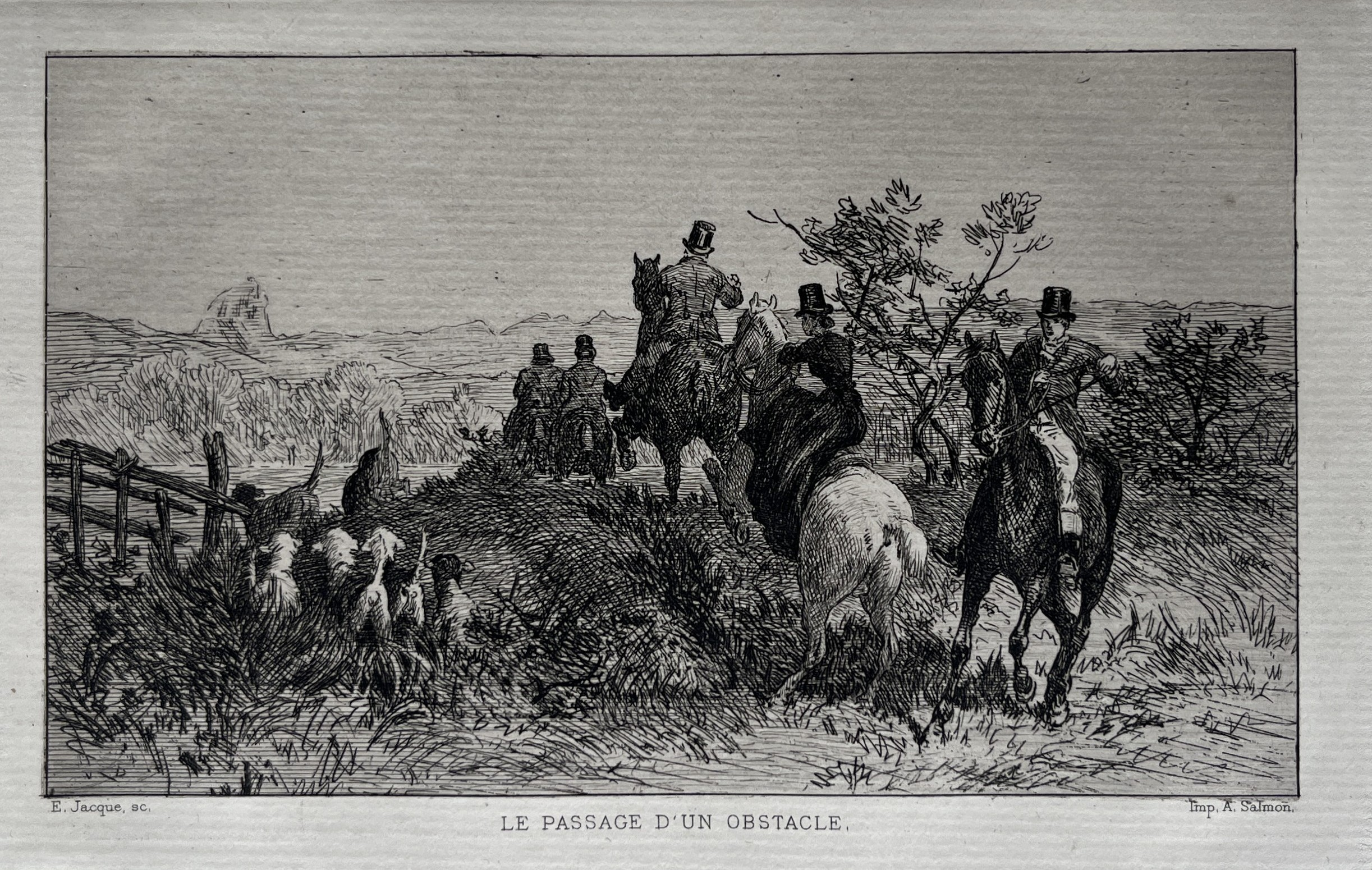
Emile Jacque (1813-1894), Fox-Hunt Pau, Jumping an obstacle with the Pic du Midi d'Ossau in the background, 1850, Master Jasper Hall Livingston

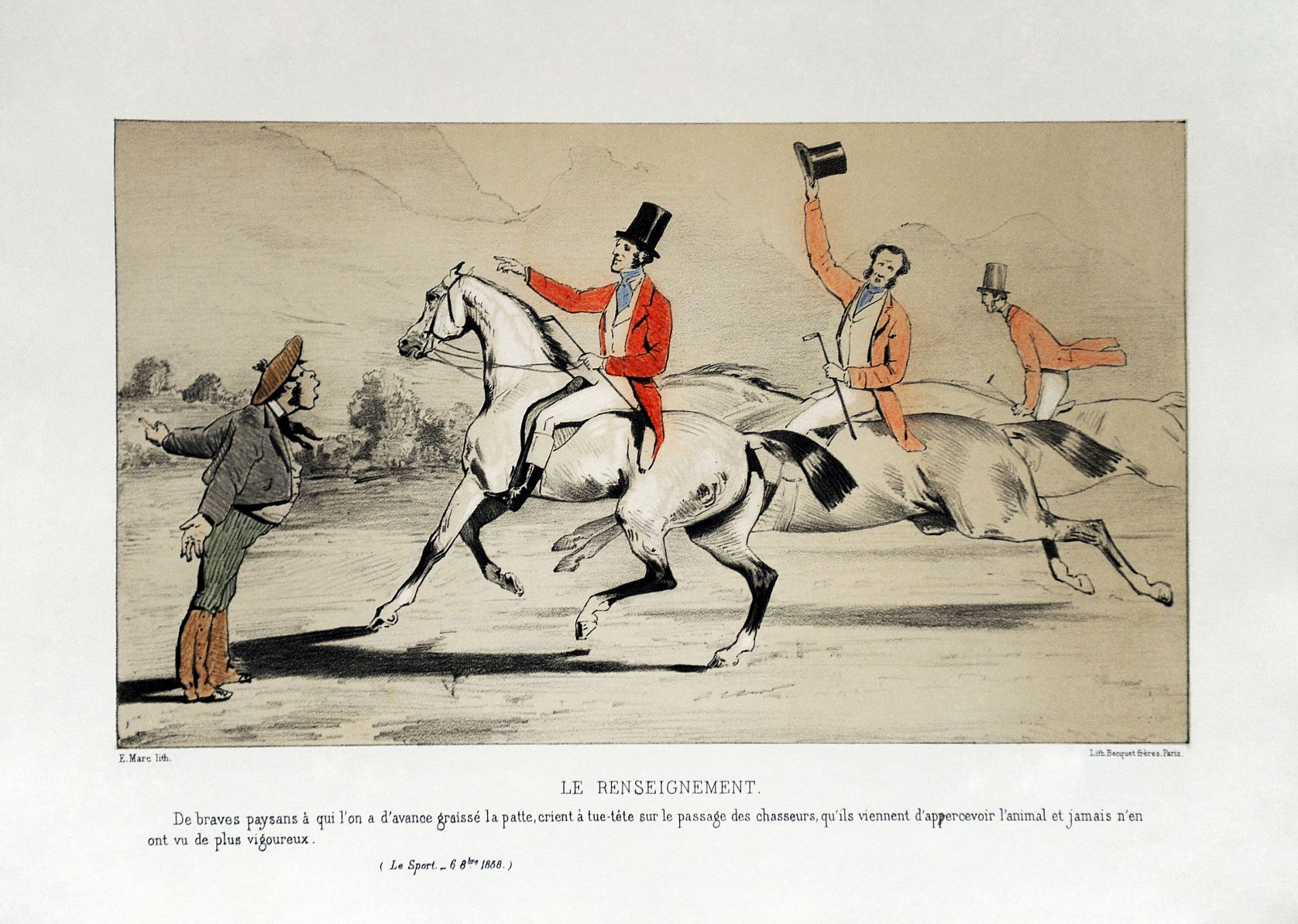
Pierre-Eugène Marc (1819-1885), "The Inquiry", 1860, Richard Lalor Power, Jasper Hall Livingston and Charles Carroll Livingston at Pau in 1858. They developed difficult variations of fox and drag hunting for hard riders.

Accompanied by Huntsman Dupont, Livingston went to England to replace his hound pack for the 1849-1850 season. He sold the pack to Richard Francis Lalor Power in 1854, who moved it to a kennel in Lescar. In 1857, Power purchased a farmhouse he named Billère Lodge with land strattling Billère and adjacent Pau, where he built kennels, stables and the Villa Bilhère. (Note: Billère is Modern French for Middle French Bilhère. Older spellings in Béarnese are Vilhere and Vilhera) (Note: Villa Bilhère has also been known as Villa Power and Villa Hutton)

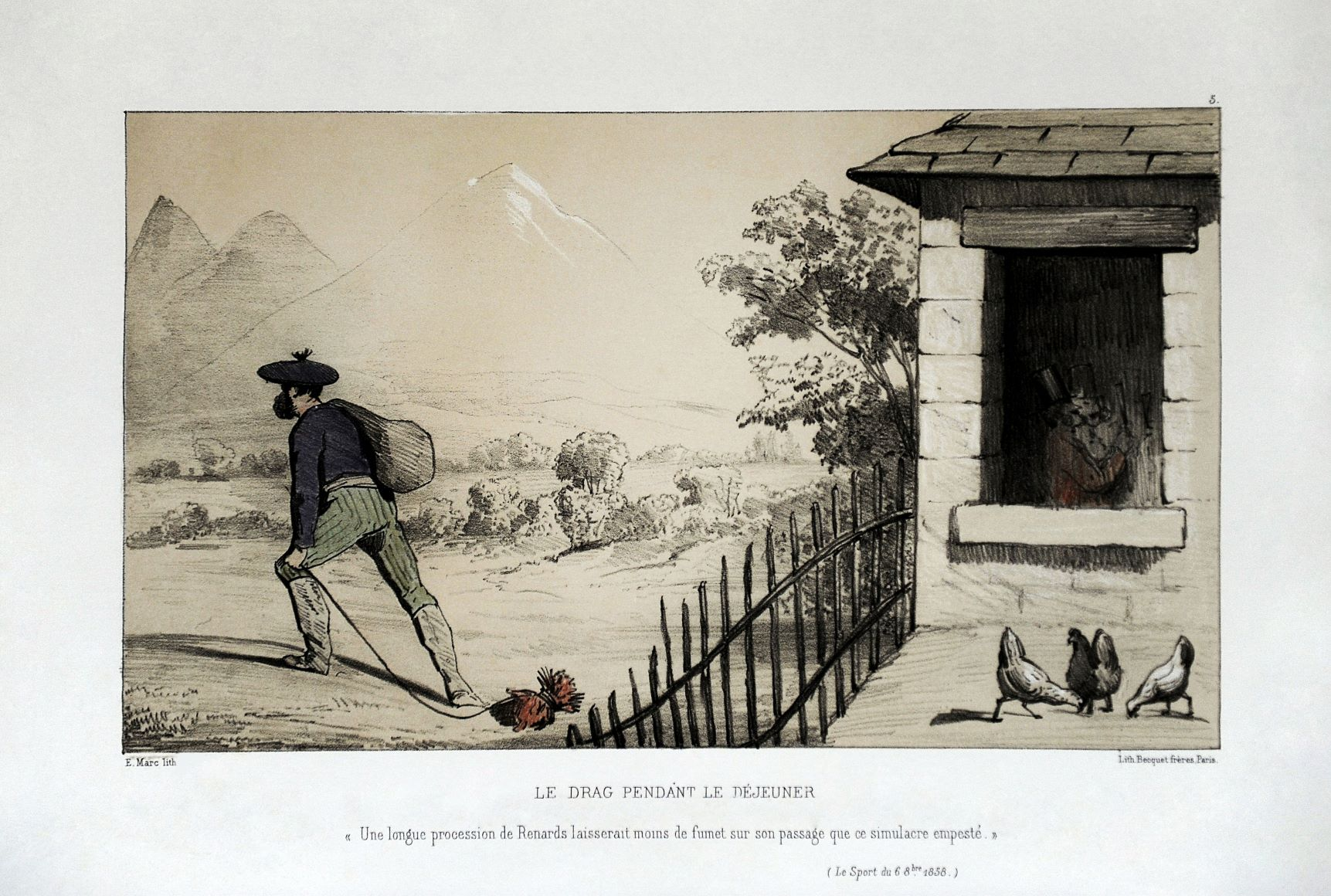
E. Marc, "The drag during lunch"

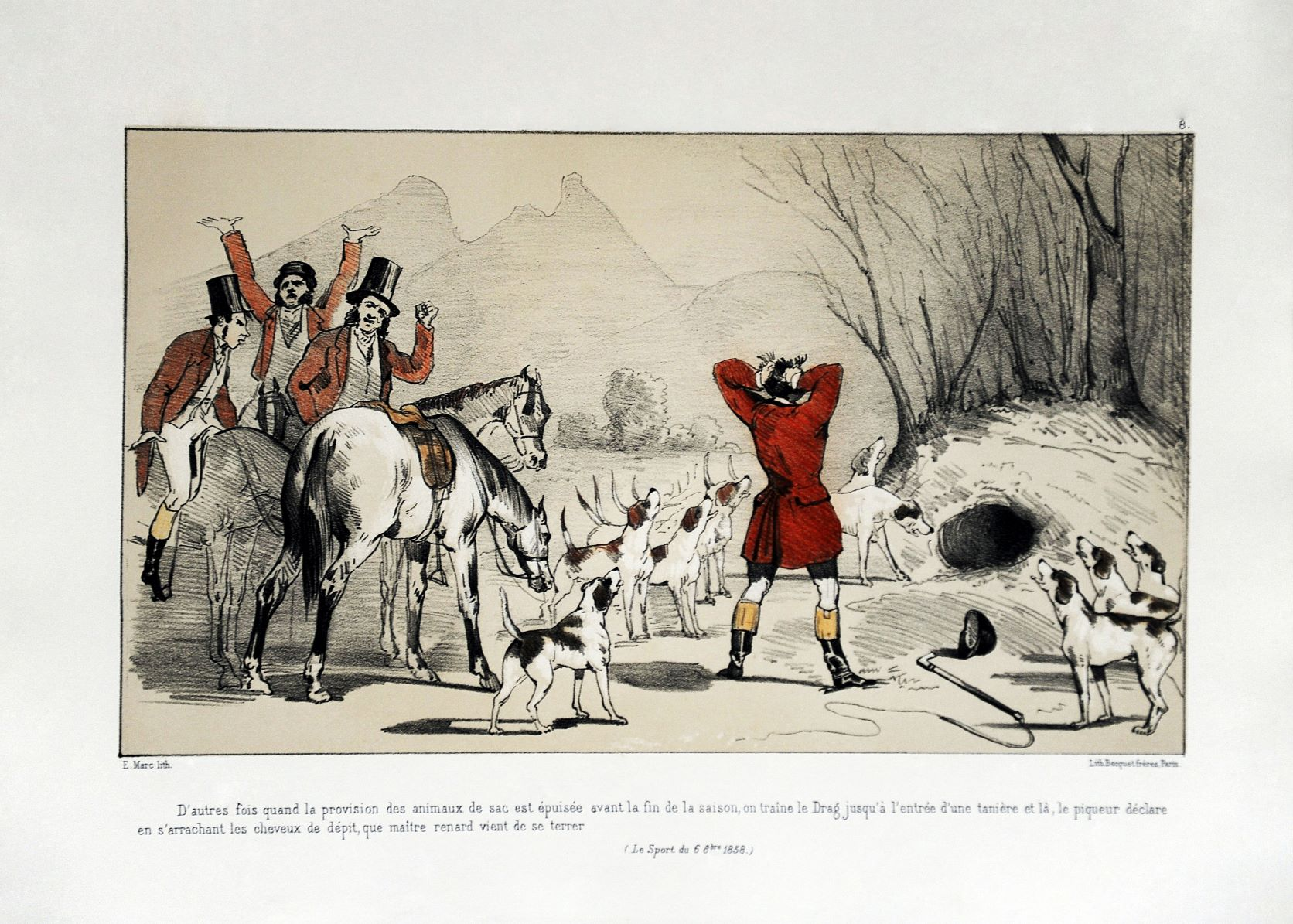
E. Marc, "In times past, when the supply of bagmen was exhausted before the end of the season, the Drag stopped at the entrance of a den and there, the huntsman declares, tearing his hair out in despair, that Master Fox has just gone into hiding."

The third edition of a travel guide by Dr. Alexander Taylor published in 1861 states there were two packs; one at Power's in Billère for subscription and a private pack at Villa Livingston, both used to continue developing difficult hunt-like sports of drag hunting and the capture and release of foxes and larger game including fallow deer. The speed and endurance of hounds during a hunt was determined by the fox and were augmented considerably by laying an artificial trail with defined obstacles, improving training for horses and riders. The capture and release of wild animals (this is no longer done) was used to simplify and expedite a hunt, most frequently capturing and "bagging" foxes then later releasing them at another meet where they would be unfamiliar with the country, keeping them from going underground. A bagman could be released at the end of a drag hunt as an incentive/reward for the hounds. (Note: Hounds hunt the fox, while riders follow, or "ride to" the hounds) As early as Livingston, the hunt advertised to buy caught foxes in the local press. A similar concept was developed for fallow deer, bringing them to meets in cages, releasing them and then hunting them. None of this is done today. Lord Howth rebuked claims foxes became less numerous and was the reason traditional fox hunting was replaced with hunting bagged foxes, eventually alternating with drag hunting. He wrote that new sports corrupted traditional game hunting on horseback.

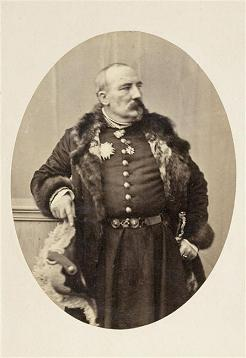
Maréchal Bosquet hunted at Pau.

An 1858 article by the Marquess of Foudras mocked these new sports at Pau. The response of Livingston and Power was to mock the Foudras article through a commissioned series of lithographs by Pierre-Eugène Marc in album format with the title translated as "A Hunting Album, The Pau Drag". First released in 1860, this parody of the Foudras article was depicted in 10 lithographs by Pierre-Eugene Marc. An additional lithograph by Marc and two by Jean-Alexandre Duruy were available between December 1860 and 1863 mocking their critics. Famous participants of the Pau Hunt during this period included William Hamilton, 11th Duke of Hamilton, Ward McAllister and Marshal Pierre Bosquet.

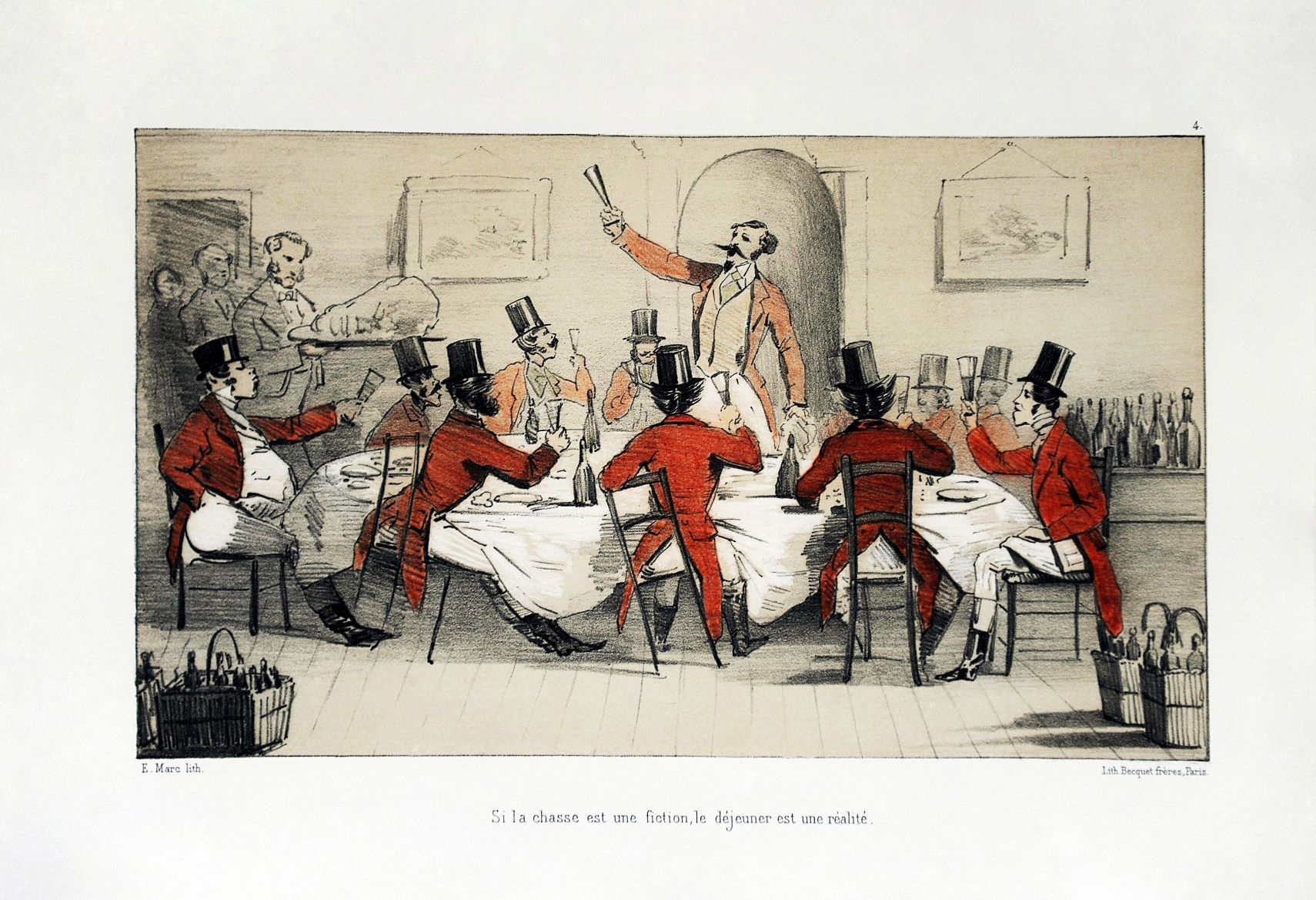
Pierre-Eugène Marc (1819-1885), "If the hunt is fiction, lunch is a reality", 1860, Ward McAllister at Pau in 1858.

Sometime after 1861, Power had financial difficulties and was replaced by Captain Philip Savage Alcock for the 1864-1865 season, who hunted with a pack of harriers. Local property owners began demonstrating due to property damage, but local politicians attempted to appease them because of the popularity of the Pau Hunt among tourists including the French who comprised over one-third of the kennel committee.

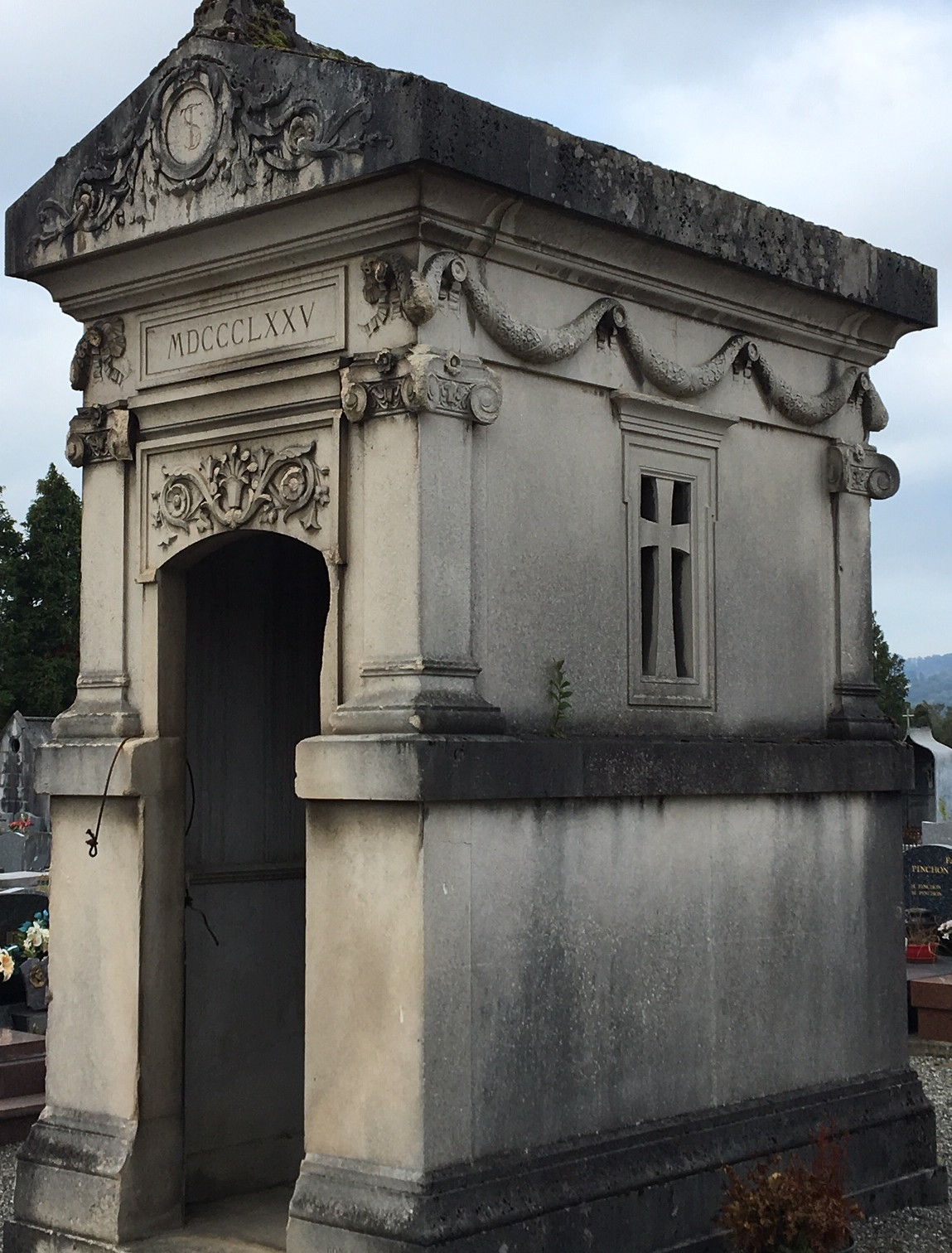
Norman Story Memorial Chapel, Pau Urban Cemetery. The day after Norman Story's death, the Pau Hunt was forced to register as La Société de la Chasse à Courre along with a negotiated plan to compensation local property owners for any damages caused by the hunt. The plan was finalized by subscribers on 5 April 1875.

Alcock resigned and was replaced by Jasper Hall Livingston in 1868, with kennels at Villa Livingston. Livingston's hunt was fashionable and began appearing in publications not related to sports; an article by children's book author Aunt Fanny, Frances Barrow which was later published in Schribner's Monthly Magazine, and in Miss Maria Grant's two tomb romance novel The Sun-Maid set in Pau and published in 1877.

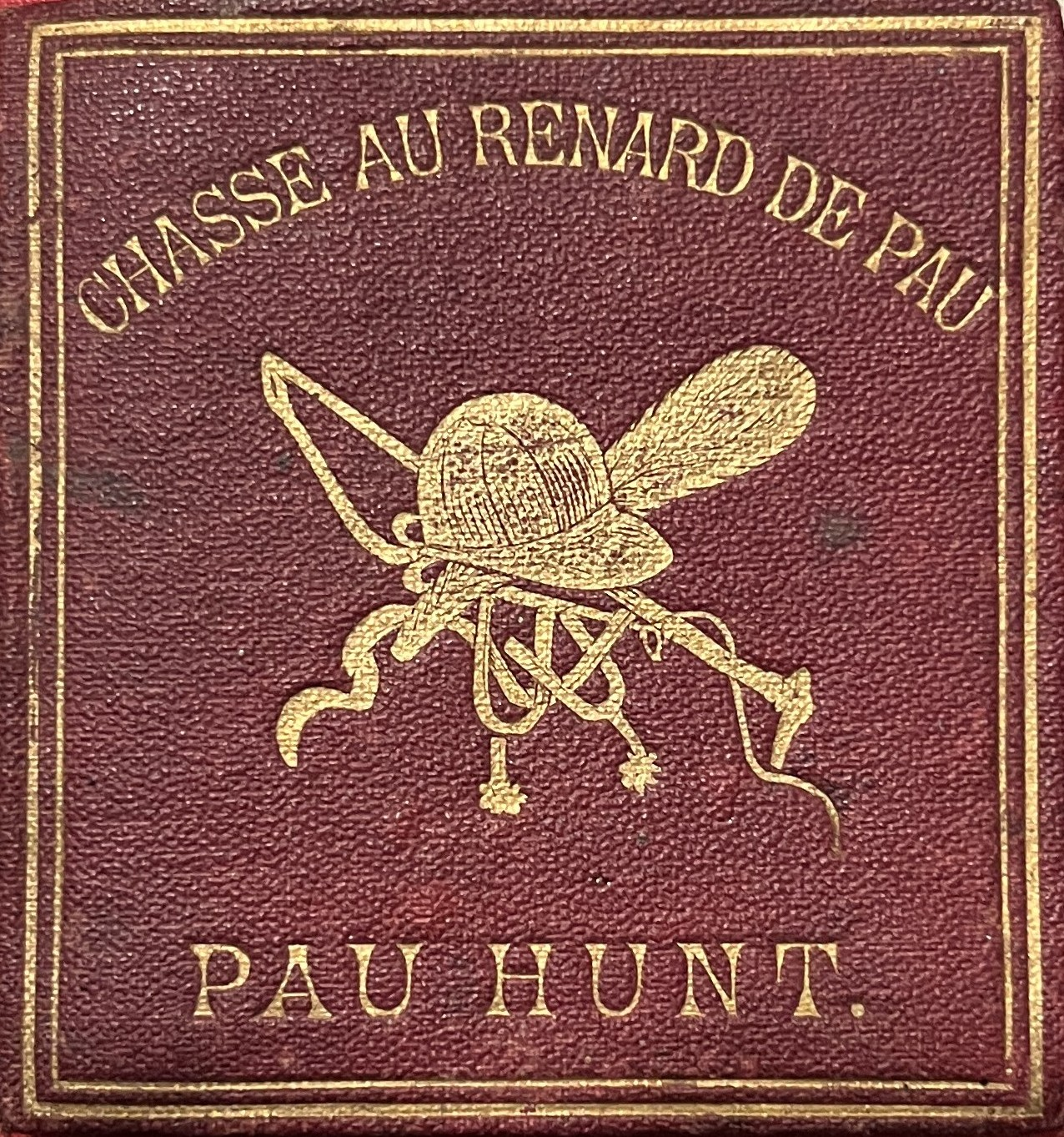
Pau Hunt Pocket Map Cover, Season 1868-1869

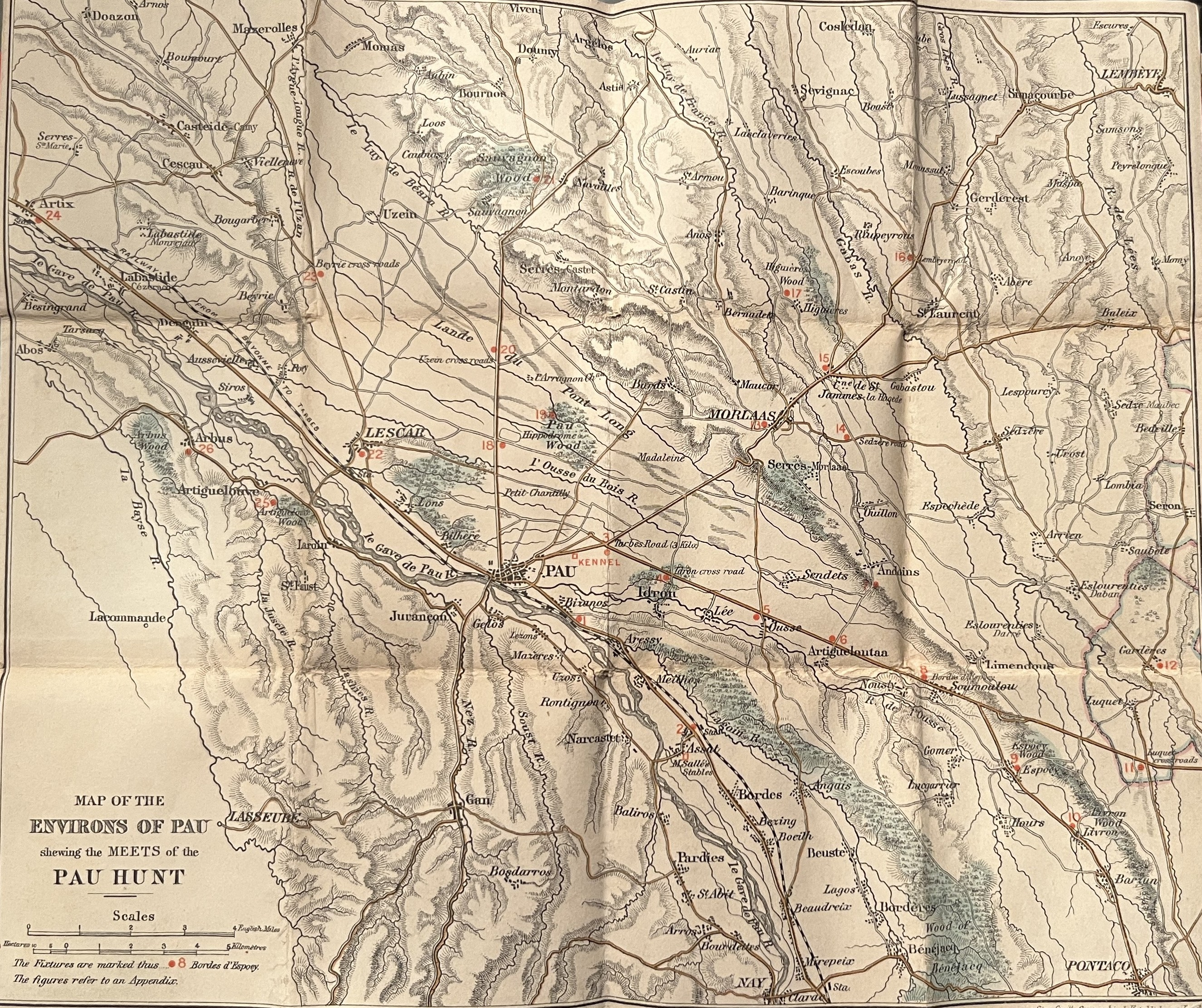
Pau Hunt Folding Pocket Map with Meet locations numbered in red, 1868-1869 Season

Livingston did not arrive for the 1873-1874 season and was replaced by Major William Henry Cairnes followed later in 1874 by William George Tiffany, who along with Norman Story moved the kennels to Villa Navarre, began keeping kennel financial records and began writing by-laws. (Note: William George Tiffany was from Baltimore, the son of William Tiffany and Mary Marean. William Sr. was the cousin of Otis Tiffany. They owned what is known as the Tiffany-Fisher House and home of the Mount Vernon Club. Tiffany married Mary Virginia "Jennie" Smith in 1888, and managed her brother-in-law's (William Kissam Vanderbilt) stables near Paris. They divorced in 1903. Vanderbilt was the cousin of later MFH William Knapp Thorn Jr. (See Tiffany family genealogy at Find a Grave.)) (Note: Norman Story was the son of Benjamin Story, who moved to New Orleans after the Louisiana Purchase and was the president of The Bank of Louisiana. Benjamin and his wife, Ann Elizabeth Clement were the parents of eleven children. Norman’s mother died when he was just three-years old and his father died when he was six. At the time of Benjamin Story’s death, six of the children were still alive. Norman’s maternal grandmother was appointed the minors’ guardian and assured their upbringing and inheritance. (See Story family genealogy at Find a Grave.).) They then relocated the hounds to what were believed to be permanent kennels at the Petit Chantilly, now Villa Beverly in December 1874 with most of the expenses paid by Tiffany and Story. Landowners continued demonstrating due to property damage.

On January 26, 1875, Tiffany and Story were hunting and ordered a peasant to open a gate, who refused, and then suddenly swung it open when Story started jumping it, making his horse fall on him. Story died the following evening. (Note: Le Memorial des Pyrénées lists the date of Norman Story's death as January 29th. The date of his death registration with the mayor's office was January 28th and states he passed away the prior evening on January 27th, 1875.) A general meeting was held the following day, approving the by-laws of the association and by prefect Jean de Nadaillac, along with a plan to compensate landowners for damages. The by-laws were finalized for the La Société de la Chasse à Courre on April 5, 1875 at which time Tiffany resigned as MFH.

=== Difficult Years (1875–1880) ===
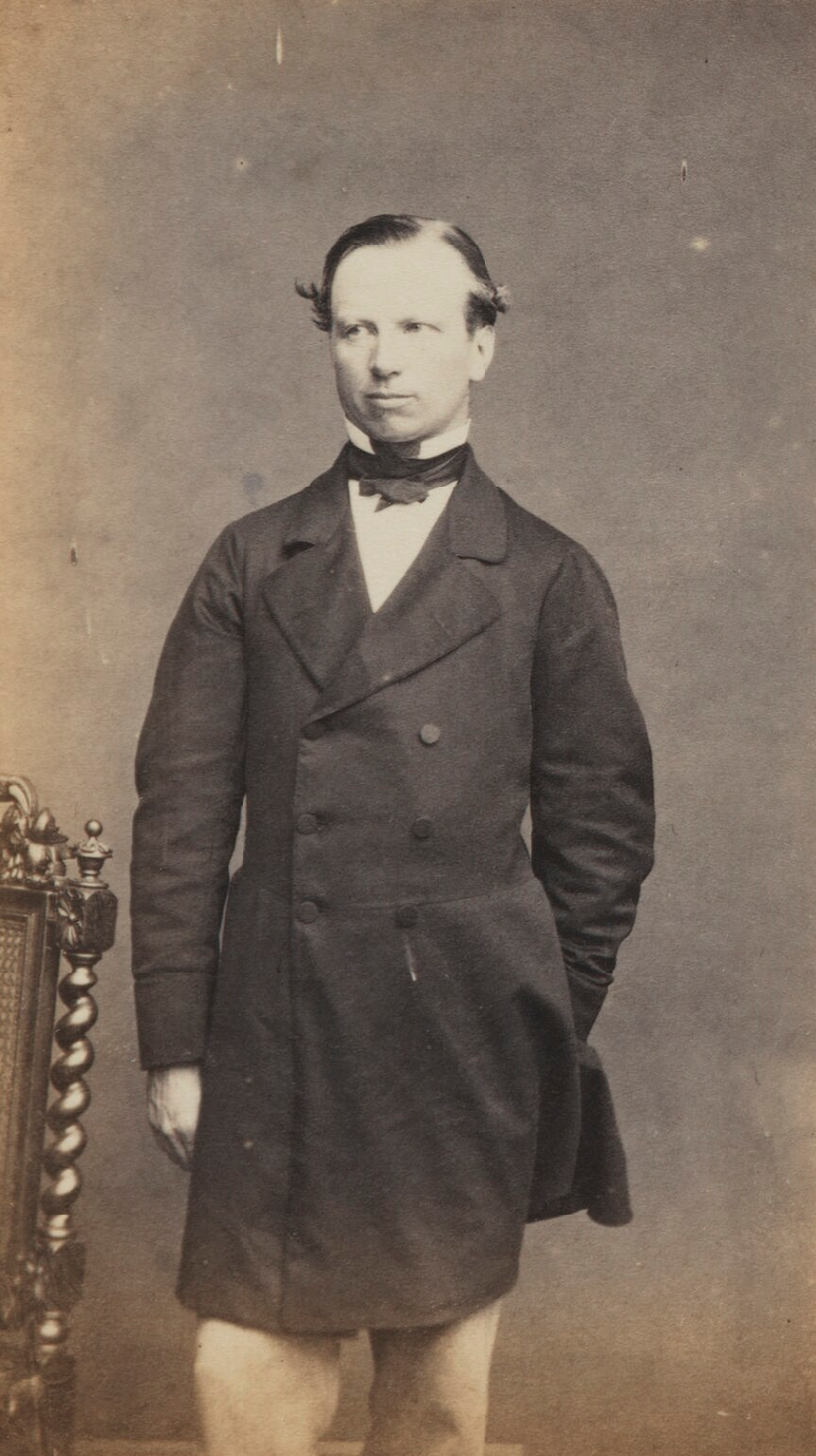
William Ulick Tristram St Lawrence, Lord Howth came to Pau for his health and traditional hunting - the first time in 1863 when "real fox hunting had ceased to exist". Howth excluded those whom he considered perpetrators - Livingston and Power in his history of the Pau Hunt.

Major William Henry Cairnes became MFH and brought in an English huntsman, retaining the French one, Pascal as Whip. In ill health, he was replaced by Captain W. Browne in 1878, who refused the title MFH. Lord Howth served as MFH with a new pack for the 1878 - 1879 season, but did not complete the season and was followed the next year by John Stewart.

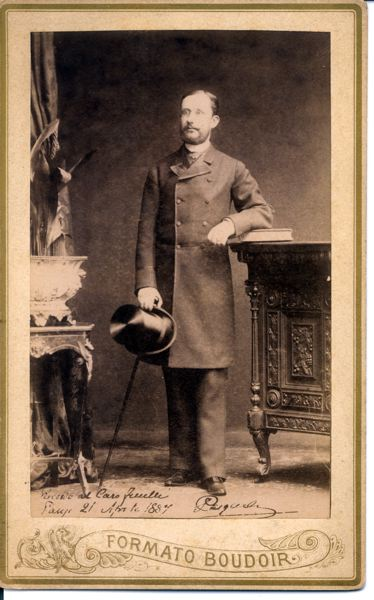
Pasquale, Count of Bari preferred the new and more difficult methods of hunting.

This period was tumultuous and ended with the liquidation of the Pau Hunt, which had always been known to be accessible to subscribers with pulmonary diseases. The difficulty level, popularity and frequency of drag and bagman hunting was seen by Lord Howth as exclusionary to less capable riders, himself included. (Note: Howth believed his tuberculous was "inherited" from his mother.) Howth made it his quest to make 'real fox hunting' accessible to those in ill health, while other members preferred the expediency of bagmen for fox hunting and wanted more drag hunts with the release of a bagman at the end. An additional method, dubbed 'a new departure', became popular combining a drag hunt with a fox hunt, by releasing a bagman upon hearing the pack's approach near the end of the drag hunt's artificial trail, beginning a fox hunt for the second segment.

The Count of Bari moved into today's Villa Longchamp in 1874. After Lord Howth's tenure, he brought in a private pack of hounds in 1879 and began a second hunt with Tiffany proposing Bari become the Pau Hound master. The Pau Hunt, claimed he had no right to hunt in their territory, but Bari replied he had no intention to negotiate and would continue the competing hunt during the 1880-1881 season. On April 14, 1880, the kennel committee voted 12 to 7 in favor of dissolving the committee and liquidating the Pau Hunt. They notified Mayor Aristide de Monpezat that they could no longer operate the hunt while there was a competing pack.

=== Hunting during the dissolution of the Kennel Committee (1880–1882) ===
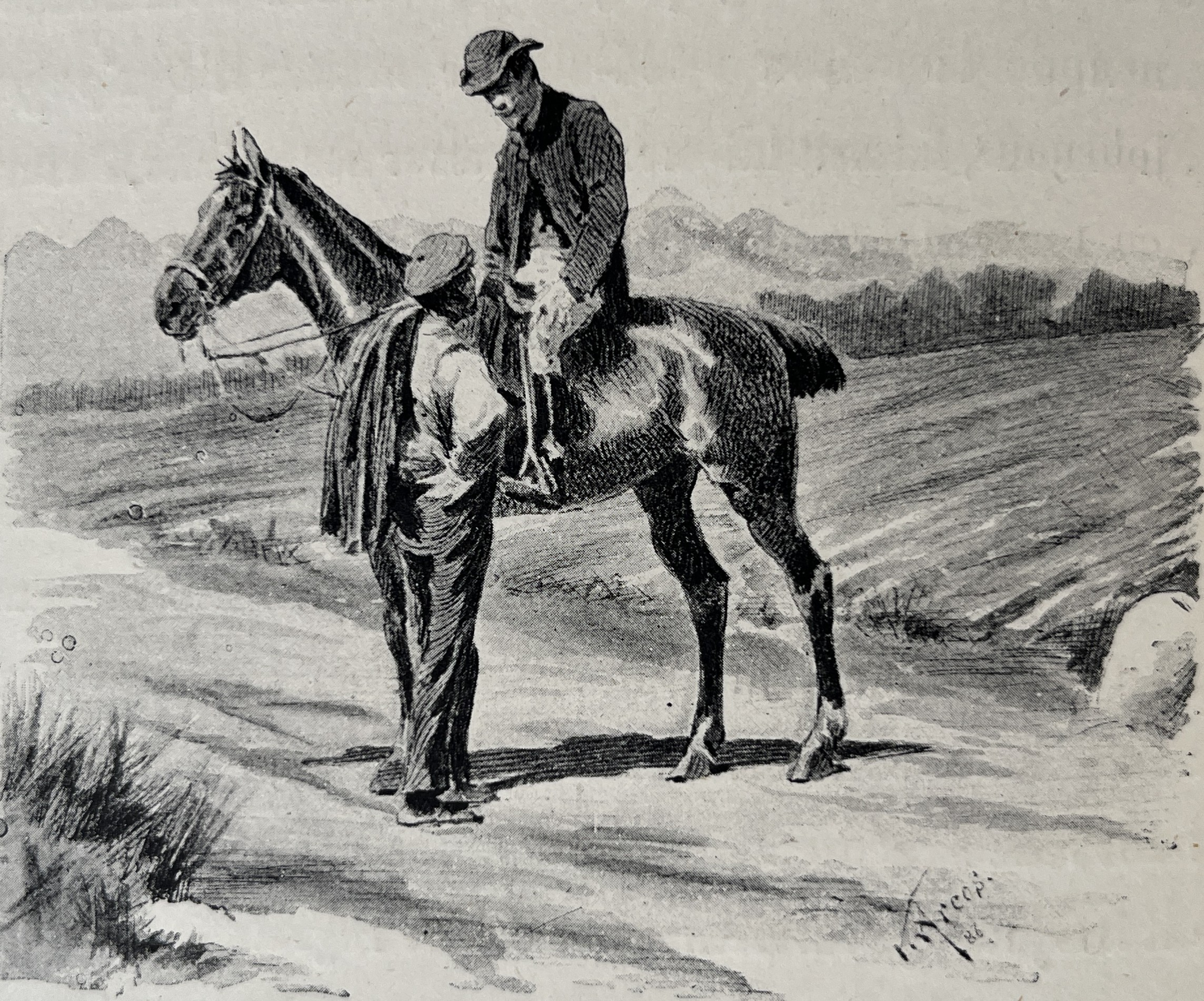
Master James Gordon Bennett Jr.

At the beginning of the 1880-1881 season, Thomas G. Burgess, whom Lord Howth described as in ill health, wrote for the assistance of James Gordon Bennett Jr., who arrived from Paris. (Note: Burgess' brother, Edward Burgess, was a well-known yacht designer - Bennett's greatest passion. Along with Commodore Bennett, Pau Hunt subscribers who were members of the New York Yacht Club include Frank Lawrance Jr., (also his Uncle William Thomas Garner) and Frederick Henry Prince.) After meeting with the mayor, influential Bennett met with the Count of Bari, who gave his hounds to the town hall. The hunt was immediately reconstituted on December 2, 1880 with Bennett as Master assisted by Thomas Burgess. Bennett purchased 40 couples that were delivered in 1881. In 1882, Mayor Nicholas Renault insisted the Société de la Chasse à Courre be reconstituted to conform with the law, proposing they alternate packs to satisfy the needs of all riding levels. Satisfied, Bennett agreed and gave the new pack to the municipality with Thomas Burgess replacing him as MFH with the newly formed committee’s first meeting on 1 November 1882.

=== La Belle Époque (1882–1910) ===
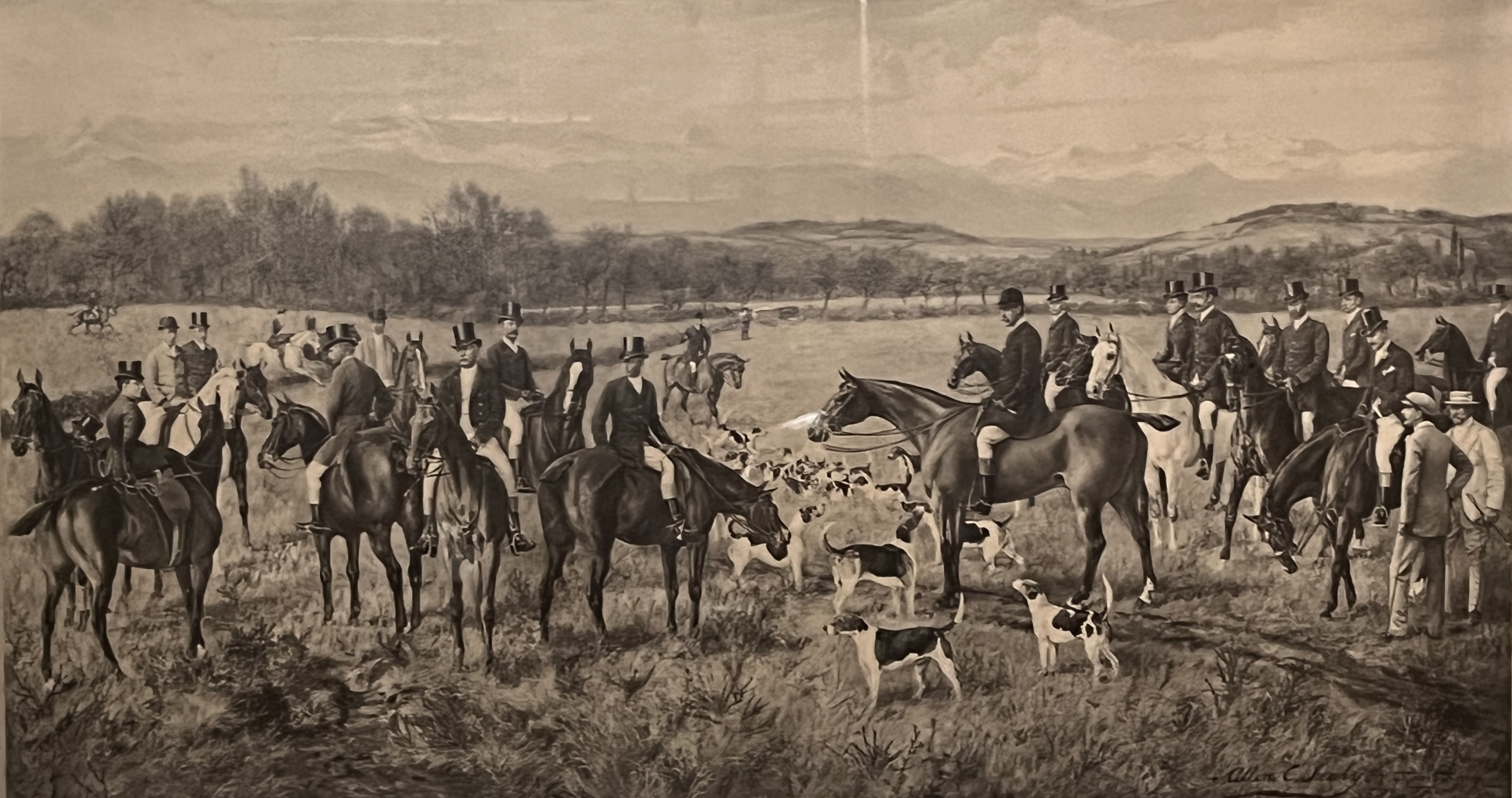
Allen Culpepper Sealy, 1850 - 1927, The Pau Hunt (50th Anniversary), Master Frederick William Maude, 1892

Dubbed “The Capital of Sports”, the relatively mild climate, outdoor activities, three clubs and a variety of places to worship made the capital of Bearn a fashionable winter resort. Master Mr. Neilson Winthrop (the brother of Egerton Winthrop) was followed by Mr. Frederick William Maude, Sir Victor Brooke, William Knapp Thorn, Lt.-Col. Talbot-Crosbie and Maude again. The first French Master was Baron Robert Lejeune and then Arthur Smyth Este "Baron d'Este", (Note: Este was the great-grandson of revolutionary Sir Robert Smyth) with Mr. Charles Henry Ridgway and Mr. John Harvey Wright Jr. at the turn of the century.

Events featuring cross-country and point-to-point matches were called Hunters Stakes in 1875 and later renamed Pau Hunt Races, marking the end of the hunting season. Entries were limited to horses that had been certified as having hunted at Pau during the season. The expense of the races, voluntary subscription fees and continued property damage made finances problematic. Masters Maude, Brooke, Lejeune and Este refused to underwrite the hunt's deficits, while regional and local governments provided subventions for advertising.

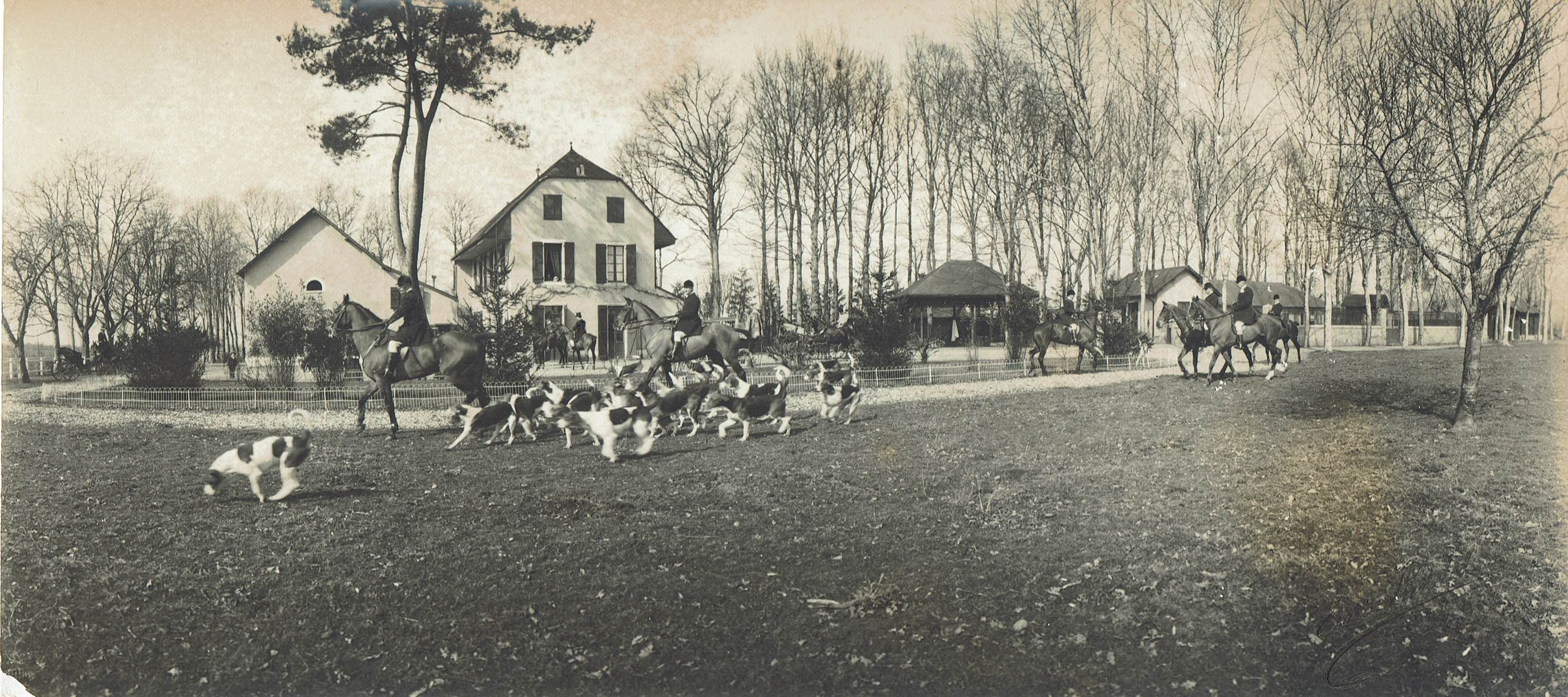
Marie Prévotat (1870-1923) Photograph c.1913. The Pau Hunt Kennels opened in 1891 were donated to the town of Pau in memory Cornelius Vanderbilt's grandson Alfred Torrance (1852-1887).

The hunt secured some financial security through the gift of today's Pau Hunt kennels in memorial of American Alfred Torrance by his mother Sophia Johnson Vanderbilt and his cousin Mr. William Knapp Thorn Jr., the daughter and grandson of Commodore Cornelius Vanderbilt. Thorn arranged his aunt's purchase of a farmhouse, followed by the construction of modern kennels, a fox house, staff lodging and a telephone line between the Pau Hunt and the English Club, making it a world-class facility that was donated to the town of Pau and opened for the 1891-1892 season with the condition foxes continue to be hunted. (Note: The property was known as Domaine Jacob. Its 1840s farmhouse has recently been nicknamed "villa Torrance". Alfred Torrance lodged at the Hotel de France on the chic place Royale, where he could dine at the English Club. Records show just one visit by Mr. and Mrs. Daniel Torrance to Pau where they stayed at the villa du Midi in 1878.)

The hunt continued to develop drag hunting with separate fox and drag hound packs and later paper chases. Lord Howth continued defending fox hunting for those with poor constitutions and proposed modifications to make drag hunting easier, such as locating meets' closer to Pau to limit fatigue for the return. In 1884 Howth published an article Invalided Sportsman describing his position. In 1887, Donatien Levesque published a direct response, Les Drags de Pau, defending the efforts of Livingston and Power - drag hunting trails could be designed to go around private property, limiting damages and improving upon the sport of fox hunting, which was often limited to a brief gallop. In February 1893, after reading an article in The County Gentlemen Sporting Gazette Hunting in Pau, Howth responded in the next issue by criticizing bagmen in Pau and its lack of real fox hunting. The following week the gazette published a severe reprimand submitted by Maude. The final word was Lord Howth's, Leicestershire in France or the Pau Hunting Field, published in 1894 and translated into French in 1907.

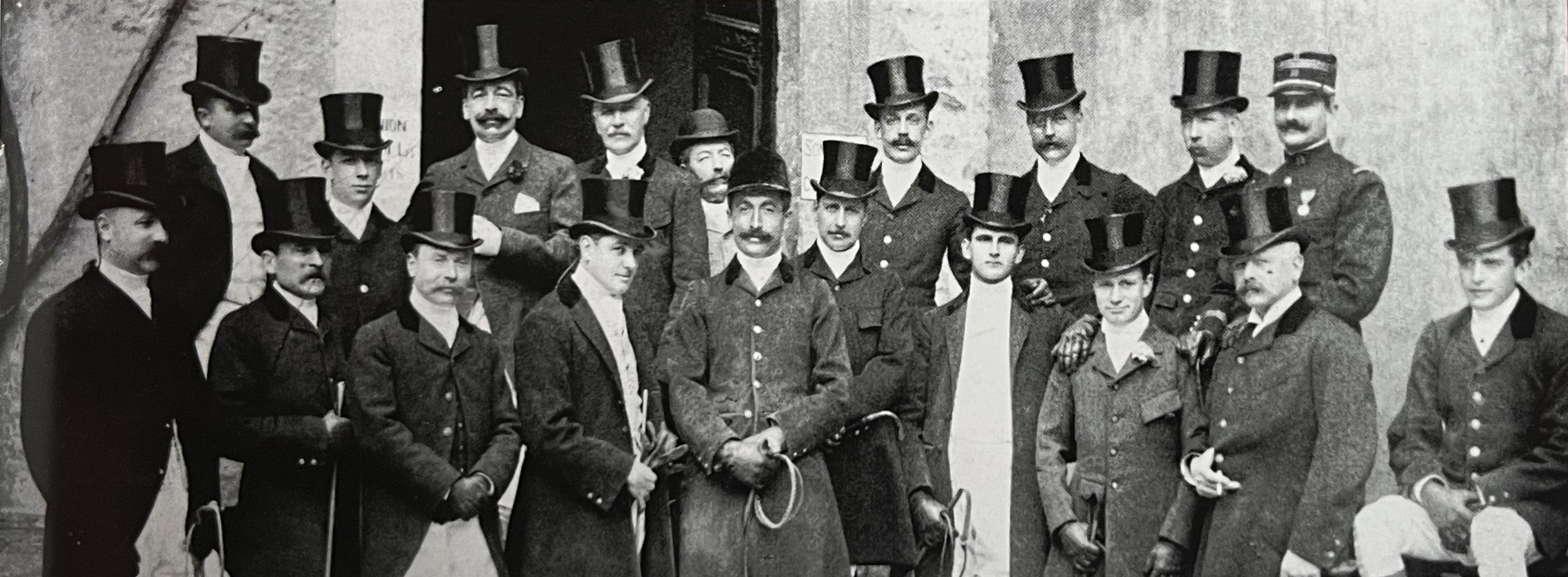
Pau Hunt Subscribers Season 1894-1895, Master Baron Robert Lejeune

Beginning at the end of Baron Lejeune's tenure, an annual sale of Pau hunters was held by Cheri auction house in Paris, where up to fifty horses were transported by train from the stables of subscribers. A 1902 article states the stable owners in Béarn kept 300 horses and that their minimum annual winnings were over 10,000,000 in 2025 Euros. Hunts were three times a week wearing red coats with green collars for the foxhound pack and green coats with red collars for the draghound pack, still followed by carriages and now joined by motorcars. The years of Charles Henry Ridgway's mastership ended the hunt's financial difficulties.

=== The Pau Hunt Races ===
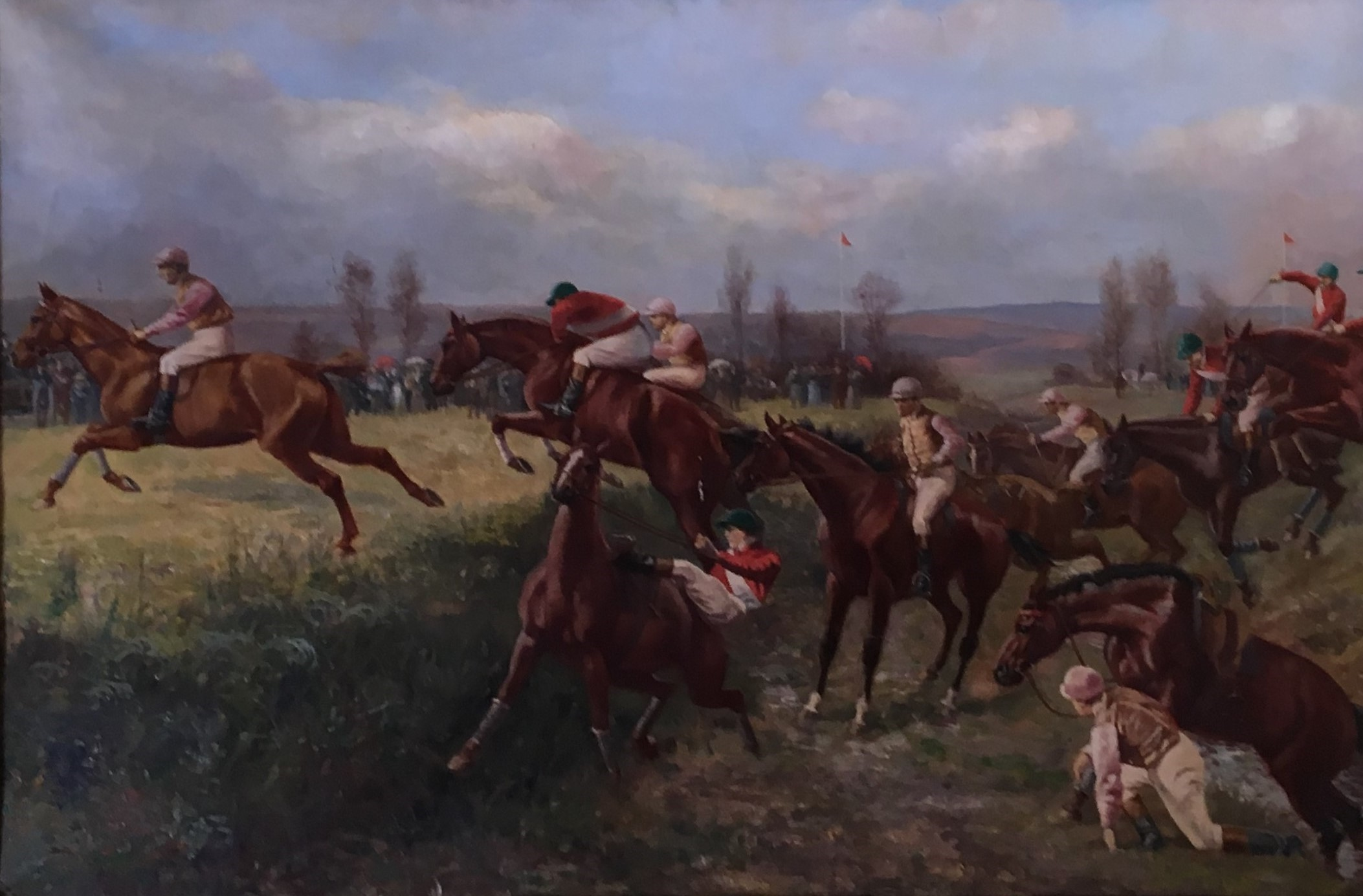
Eugène Blocaille (1873-1945) Cross-Country Match between the stables of Annie Hutton (colors - red, white and green) and F.H. Prince (colors - salmon and pink), Auriac, 3 April 1906

The Pau Hunt Races closed the winter season and were first held by the Société d'Encouragement. The first recorded was 31 March 1846 with Lieutenant O'Shirley winning the cross-country match on Andre Manascau's Malle-Poste previously owned by Sir Henry Oxenden. American Jasper Hall Livingston and Béarnais property owner M. Blair rode their own horses Yankee and Beeswing, while Hope-Johnstone rode Eclipse owned by M. Auguste de Perpigna. On December 27, 1897 the Pau Hunt modified its statutes to officially recognize the events, naming them the Pau Hunt X-Country Races organized under the rules of the Société des steeple-chases de France. The most famous race was held 3 April 1906 between the stables of Frederick Henry Prince and Annie Hutton. (Note: Anne Rosalie Helene Hutton (1869-1949)) Each stable provided six hunters certified by the MFH with six jockeys wearing their respective racing colors. The course was designed by Master Charles Henry Ridgway and committee president William Knapp Thorn Jr. The winning stable with all of its horses crossing the finish first was that of Miss Hutton. The winning hunter, Sahlia was ridden by the Viscount d'Elva wearing Mr. Prince's colors.

=== Thirty Prince Years (1910–1939) ===
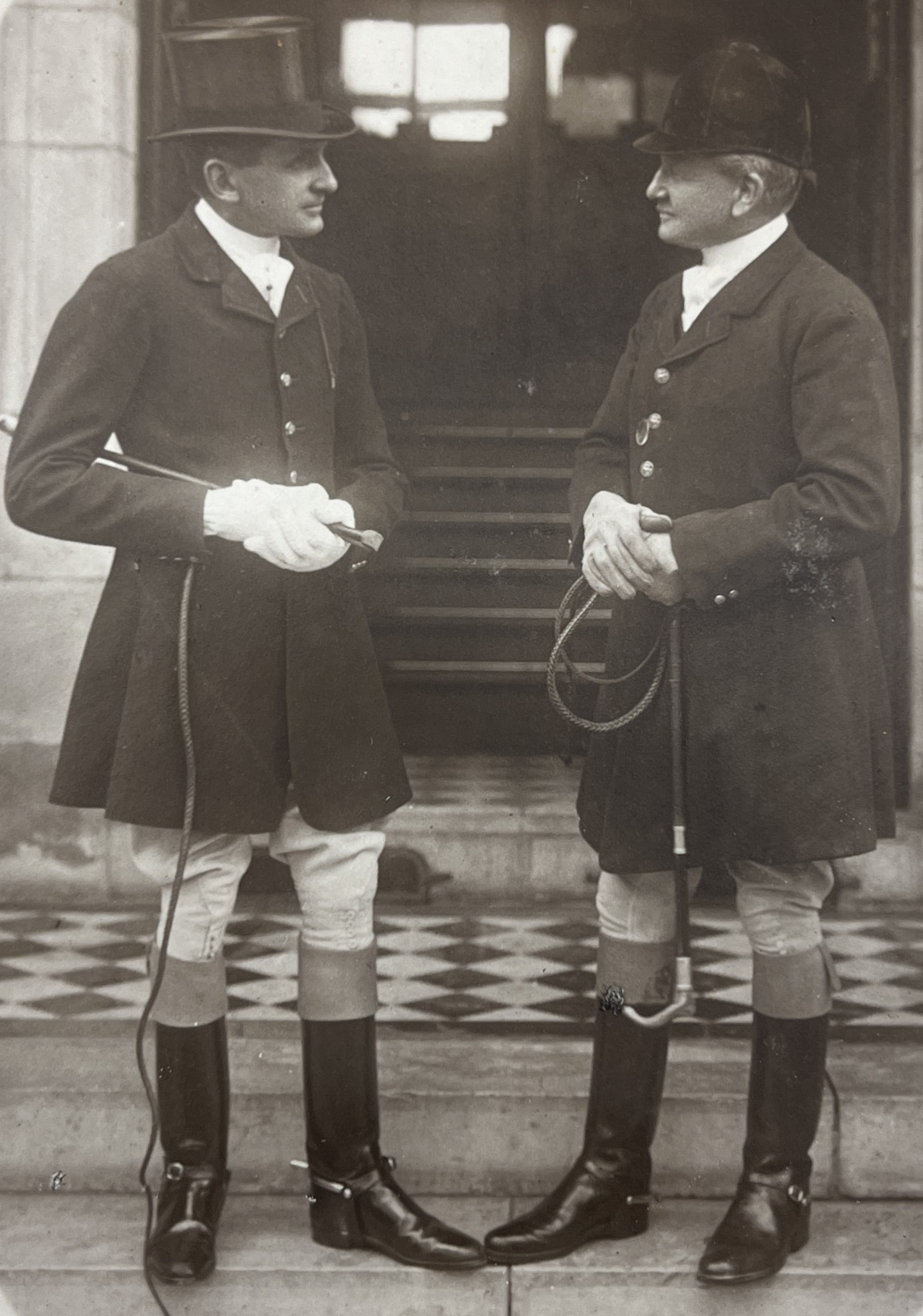
Pau Hunt President Joseph "Pito" Barron and Frederick Henry Prince before the meet

The winter tourist colony would disappear at the end of this period. In 1910, its second generation was either deceased or aging. During the 1910-1911 season, Charles Henry Ridgway was ill and ceded mastership to financier Frederick H. Prince, while Joseph "Pito" Barron replaced hunt president William Knapp Thorn Jr. who had died unexpectedly. (Note: Joseph Barron (1872-1947), mostly referred to as "Pito" or "Pepito" and sometimes erroneously as "Peter" was the son of Joseph “Pepe” Barron (1830-1884) and Roberta Walkinshaw (1844-1918). Barron was from a famous merchant family that once held British consular posts in Cadiz, Almeria, Málaga, Mexico City, Tepic and San Francisco. They had been the owners of Santa Cruz Island and the New Almaden Quicksilver Mine that was managed by Pito's grandfather Robert Walkinshaw (1788-1858).) Henri Fortuné Piscatory de Vaufreland joined them as secretary and eventually chronicled his perspective of equestrian sports and the 20th-century winter colony.

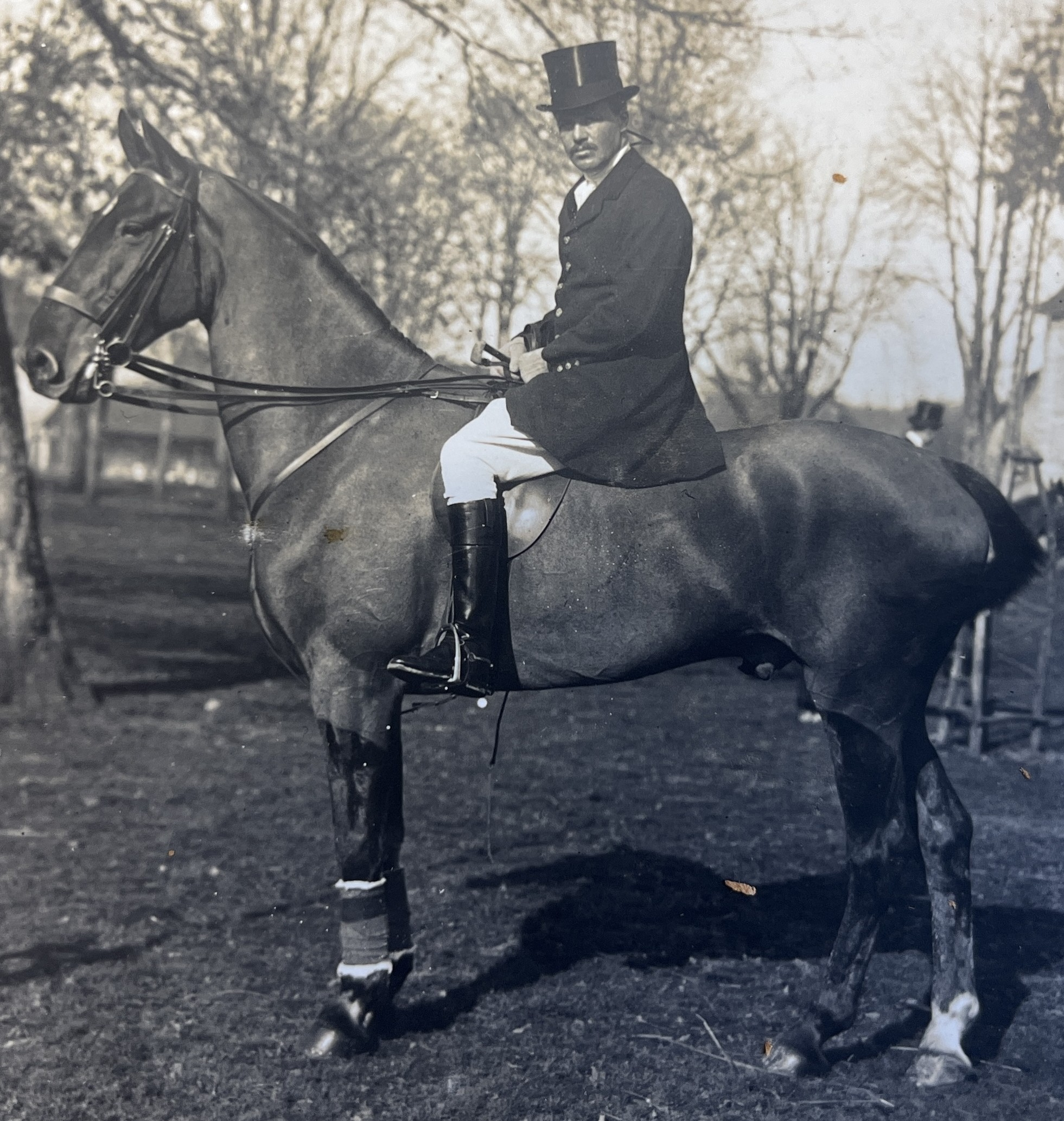
Norman Prince ready for the meet

Frederick and Abby Prince rented Villa Sainte-Hélène from the Grant de Longueuil family, where they held hunt dinners each Saturday. Opening day dinner was held in November at Villa Bilhère as had been the tradition for decades. More and more counties and states had prohibited alcohol while fewer and fewer states permitted betting on horses. Owners such as Harry La Montagne moved their stables to France only to have their hunters and thoroughbreds requisitioned at the beginning of World War I, when tourism paused and many permanent residents left. Many of the men from the Pau Hunt went to war, some fighting with France and some losing their lives including Norman Prince. In 1917, the Baron d'Este wrote an advertorial for Pau's annual tourism publication, creating the legend of the Duke of Wellington's troops founding the Pau Hunt in 1814, including an impossible 43 mile (63 km) foxhunt between Orthez and Luquet by British officers and enemy French dragoons. Prince joked that Wellington played checkers with Napoleon's soldiers in the nearby Happy (heurèuse) Valley. (Note: "Playing checkers" may have been a play on words or meant as an idiom for the underestimation of a more formidable opponent. Regardless, Wellington was never near the foothills south of Pau.)

After the war, Prince's generosity sustained both the Pau Hunt and the English Club. He brought hunters in for the 1919-1920 season and purchased Villa Sainte-Hélène the following year. He was joined by American and British stable owners during prohibition and horse betting interdictions in the United States. The Princes, La Montagnes and Belle Baruch were all painted hunting at Pau by Sir Alfred Munnings.

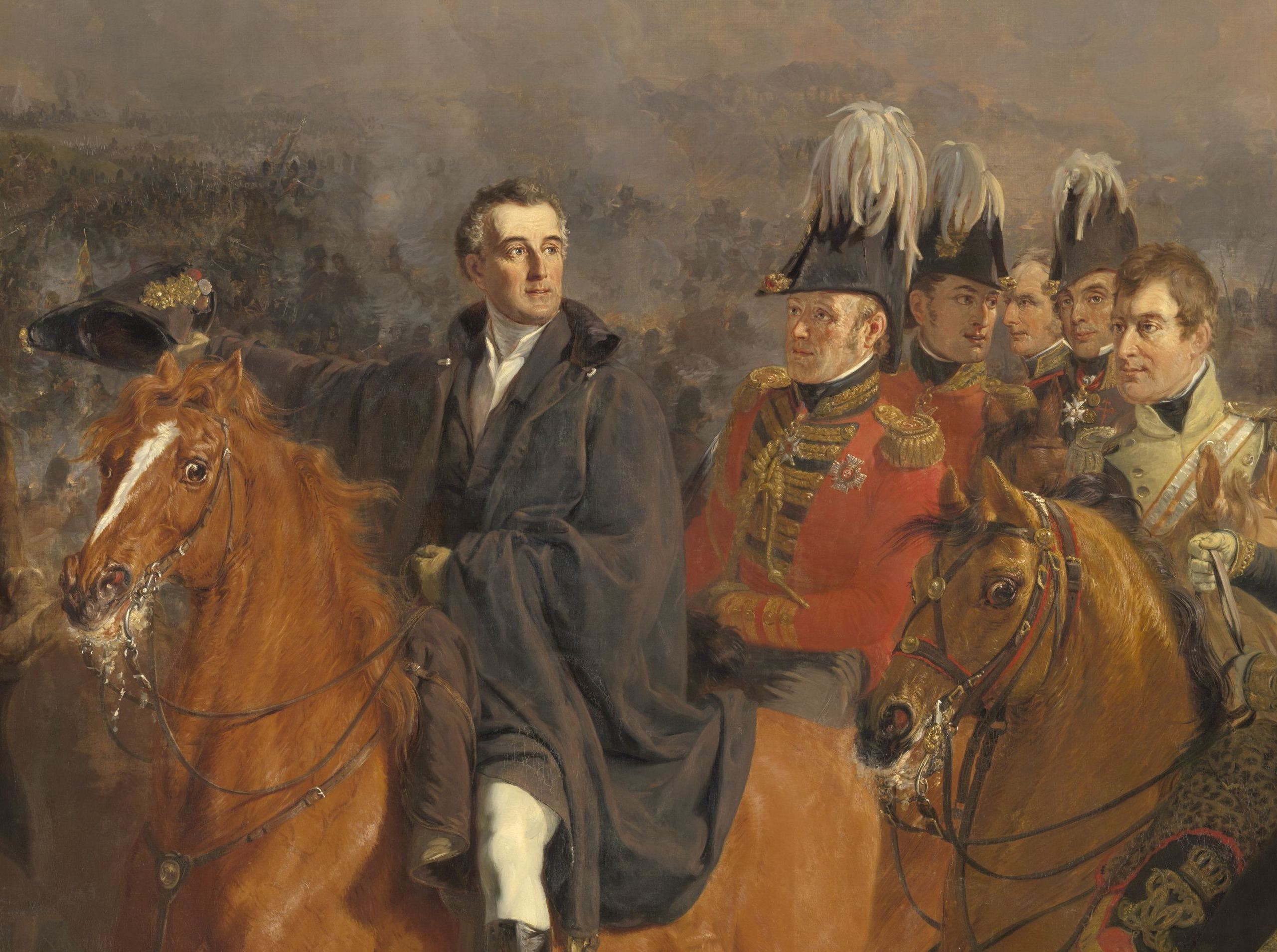
Promotional materials created the legend that the Duke of Wellington was Pau's first master of the hounds, along with claims British officers hunted with enemy dragoons in the Pau Hunt Field in 1814.

After the Wall Street crash of 1929, the Pau Hunt used Lord Wellington in promotional articles, including the European edition of The Chicago Tribune, the home of Prince's empire. They listed Wellington as one of its former masters in Baily's Hunting Directory. During the Great Depression, prohibition and betting restrictions were lifted, fewer tourists come to Pau and the core third generation were now aging.

Anticipating war, Bernard Baruch pressed his daughter Belle Baruch to move her stables to Hobcaw Barony in 1936 for her own safety and to avoid potential requisition of her horses. Prince was 79-years old when he left Pau in 1939, Pito Barron died in Billère in 1947. Vaufreland worked on his chronicles during the war and helped revive equestrian sports in Pau after the war.

== List of Masters at Tarbes ==
- 1832 to 1839: Royal Wolfcatcher Mr. Dupont
- 1839 to 1842: Sir Henry Chudleigh Oxenden (new pack)

== List of Masters of the Pau Hounds ==
The following list ignores a plaque entitled "Masters of the Pau Hounds" that has an erroneous list of masters and originated from a 1907 publication by Charles Baconnière de Salverte, Les P.H. Modernes sous le Mastership de C.H. Ridgway esq. par Thya Hillaud.

- 1842 Sir Henry Chudleigh Oxenden offers pack to French and British friends at Pau in November.
- 1842 to 1844: Mr. J. Cornwell. 'Kennels at Pontacq.
- 1844 to 1845: Mr. Charles Whyte of Pilton House - not his brother Col. John James Whyte. (Note: Mr. Charles Whyte was the Master of the Pau Hounds. His famous elder brother, Colonel John James Whyte (1809-1889) served in Canada where he married Marie Elizabeth Grant, the daughter of Captain David Alexander Grant and the Marie Charles Le Moyne, 4th Baroness de Longueuil (1755-1841). Mrs. Whyte’s nephew Charles James Irwin Grant, 6th Baron de Longueuil built villa Sainte Hélène in Pau. Colonel Whyte hunted at Pau with his brother Charles during the season 1846-1847).)
- 1845 to 1847: Mr. William Standish and Mr. Pery Standish (new pack).
- 1846: New kennel at Soumoulou built by Pery Standish.
- 1847 to 1854: Mr. Jasper Hall Livingston (new pack in 1849)
- 1848 French Revolution of 1848 No hunting at Pau.
- 1854: Livingston sold pack to Richard Francis Lalor Power who moved them to Lescar.
- 1854 to 1863: Mr. Richard Francis Lalor Power
- 1857 Kennels moved to new Power residence at Billère Lodge, later Villa Séguier now demolished.
- 1864 to 1867: Captain Philip Savage Alcock (new Harrier pack)
- 1867: First Kennel Committee meeting minutes.
- 1868 to 1873: Mr. Jasper Hall Livingston
- 1868: New Pack. Kennels moved to Livingston residence (See Kennels - Pau Hunt Pocket Map 1868-1869).
- 1868: First recorded General Subscriber Meeting held at the English Club.
- 1870-1871: Franco-Prussian War. No Hunting at Pau.
- 1873 to 1874: Major William Henry Cairnes
- 1874 to 1875: Mr. William George Tiffany
- 1874: Kennels at Tiffany and Norman Story residence at Villa Navarre.
- 1875: New kennel at Villa le Petit-Chantilly today's lycée Saint-Dominique.
- 1875: Death of Norman Story and Founding of the Société de la chasse à courre.
- 1875 to 1878: Major William Henry Cairnes (In ill health, he was replaced by Captain W. Browne in 1878, who refused the title MFH.)
- 1878 to 1879: Lord William Saint Lawrence, Earl of Howth
- 1879 to 1880: John Stewart with a competing hunt mastered by Count of Bari
- 1880: Liquidation of the Société de la chasse à courre. Pack becomes property of the town of Pau.
- 1880 to 1882: Mr. James Gordon Bennett Jr., New and separate pack. Kennel location unknown.
- 1882: Refounding of the Société de la chasse à courre. Second pack given to the town of Pau.
- 1882 to 1883: Mr. Thomas G. Burgess
- 1883 to 1884: Mr. Neilson Winthrop
- 1884 to 1885: Mr. Frederick William Maude
- 1885 to 1888: Sir Victor Brooke
- 1888 to 1890: Mr. William Knapp Thorn Jr.
- 1890 to 1891: Lt.-Col. Talbot Crosbie
- 1891: Today's kennels offered to the town of Pau by Sophia Vanderbilt Torrance in memory of Alfred Torrance.
- 1891 to 1893: Mr. Frederick William Maude
- 1893 to 1896: Baron Robert Lejeune
- 1896 to 1899: Arthur Smyth Este "Baron d'Este"
- 1899 to 1900: Baron d'Este and Mr. Charles Henry Ridgway
- 1900 to 1901: Baron d'Este
- 1901 to 1903: Mr. Charles Henry Ridgway
- 1903 to 1905: Mr. Charles Henry Ridgway and Mr. John Harvey Wright Jr.
- 1905 to 1910: Mr. Charles Henry Ridgway
- 1910 to 1939: Mr. Frederick Henry Prince
- 1914 to 1918: Horses were requisitioned for World War I pausing the hunt for four years.
- 1939: Horses were requisitioned for World War II.
