= Drag hunting =

Equestrian hunting activity

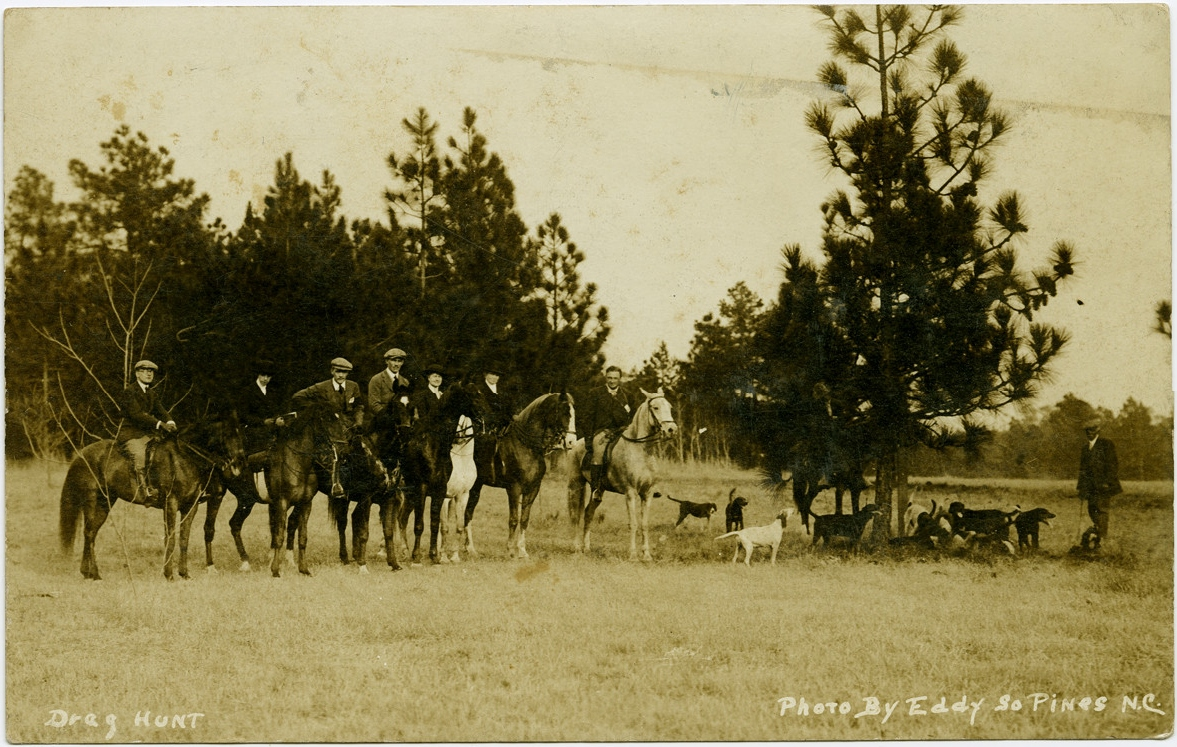
Photo postcard published in 1916 by photographer E.C. Eddy, showing a draghound pack in Southern Pines, North Carolina

Drag hunting or draghunting is a form of equestrian sport where mounted riders hunt the trail of an artificially laid scent with hounds.

== Description ==
Drag hunting is an equestrian sport where a field of mounted riders chase a pack of hounds who follow or 'hunt' a trail of an artificial non-animal based scent. The primary difference between fox hunting and drag hunting is the hounds are trained to chase a prepared scent trail laid by a person dragging a material soaked in aniseed or another strong-smelling substance and not an animal-based scent mimicking a fox hunt, as in trail hunting.

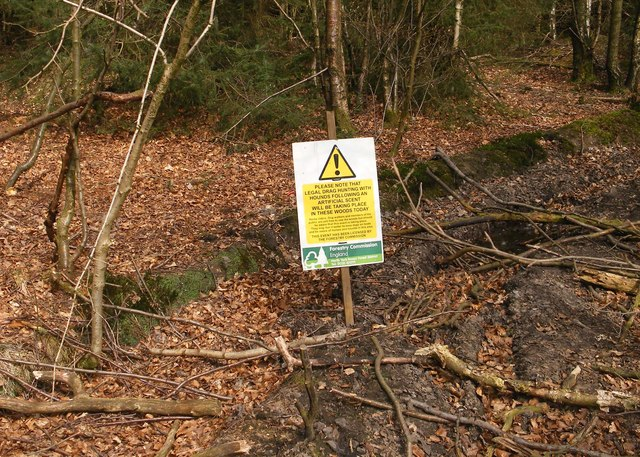
Sign warning of a drag hunt event planned to take place through an area of woodland later that day

A drag hunt course is set in a similar manner to a cross country course, following a predetermined route over jumps and obstacles. Because it is predetermined, the route can be tailored to suit the riding abilities of the field. The scent, or line, is usually laid 10 to 30 minutes prior to beginning of the drag hunt, and there are usually three to four lines, of approximately 2 mi (3.2 km) each, laid for a day of drag hunting.

The drag hunting season usually starts in mid-October and continues through autumn and winter, finishing in the spring.

== History ==
Drag hunting first became popular in the 19th century when Oxford and Cambridge universities both established packs of drag hounds.

The Pau Hunt, under the Mastership of Jasper Hall Livingston, documents a drag hunt on Saturday, November 26, 1847 between Pau, France and Gardères on the Route de Tarbes making a distance of 21 km (13 miles) in one hour.

Drag hunting soon became popular with the British Army, with the Household Cavalry establishing a pack in 1863 and the Royal Military Academy Sandhurst and the Royal Military Academy Woolwich both establishing packs in 1870. The motivation of the British Army's interest in the sport was it was seen to provide excellent preparation for beginners and those who were about to enter the cavalry divisions.

As it does not involve the hunting of live animals, drag hunting remained legal in Great Britain after the passing of the Protection of Wild Mammals (Scotland) Act 2002 and the Hunting Act 2004 (England and Wales).

== Related sports ==
=== Trail hunting ===
A controversial alternative to hunting animals with hounds in Great Britain. A trail of animal urine (most commonly fox) is laid in advance of the 'hunt', and then tracked by the hound pack and a group of followers; on foot, horseback, or both.

=== Hound trailing ===
Similar to drag hunting, but in the form of a race; usually of around 10 miles (16 km) in length. Unlike other forms of hunting, the hounds are not followed by humans.

=== Clean boot hunting ===
Clean boot hunting uses packs of bloodhounds to follow the natural trail of a human's scent.
