= Jasper Hall Livingston =

American horse owner, gentleman rider and sportsman

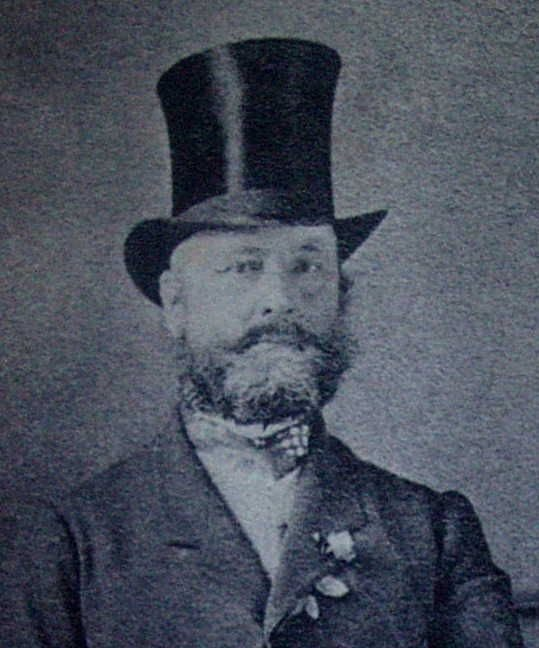
Jasper Hall Livingstone

Jasper Hall Livingstone (March 23, 1815 – March 30, 1900) was an American horse owner, gentleman rider and sportsman. He was chargé d'affaires (Secretary of Legation) under Ambassador Washington Irving at Madrid and later the Master of the Pau Hounds for 11 non-consecutive winter seasons between 1847 and 1873. He was an innovator of drag hunting and mocked in the development of this "fictitious" sport (now widely practiced), while some considered it ideal for young riders or "the impatient and brave who hunted to ride rather than rode to hunt".

== Family ==
Livingston was born on March 23, 1815, in Manhattan, New York City, as the youngest son of Henry Brockholst Livingston, Justice of the Supreme Court, and previously widowed Catherine (née Seaman) Kortright. His twin sister, Catherine Louisa Livingston, married Maurice Power, later a British MP and Lieutenant Governor of St. Lucia. Their paternal grandfather was William Livingston, the first governor of New Jersey and a Signer of the US Constitution. Their aunt, Sarah Livingston, was the wife of Founder, Statesman, New York Governor and Chief Justice John Jay.

Jasper Hall Livingston married Mathilda Anne Cecila Morris, the youngest daughter of Sir John Morris, 2nd Baronet of Clasemont, May 26, 1851, at Dover, Kent, England. The couple normally spent the winter hunting season at Pau, France, where they owned a villa. Their children, Florence and Guy were born at Pau. Livingston was a member of the English Club.

== Master of the Pau Hounds ==
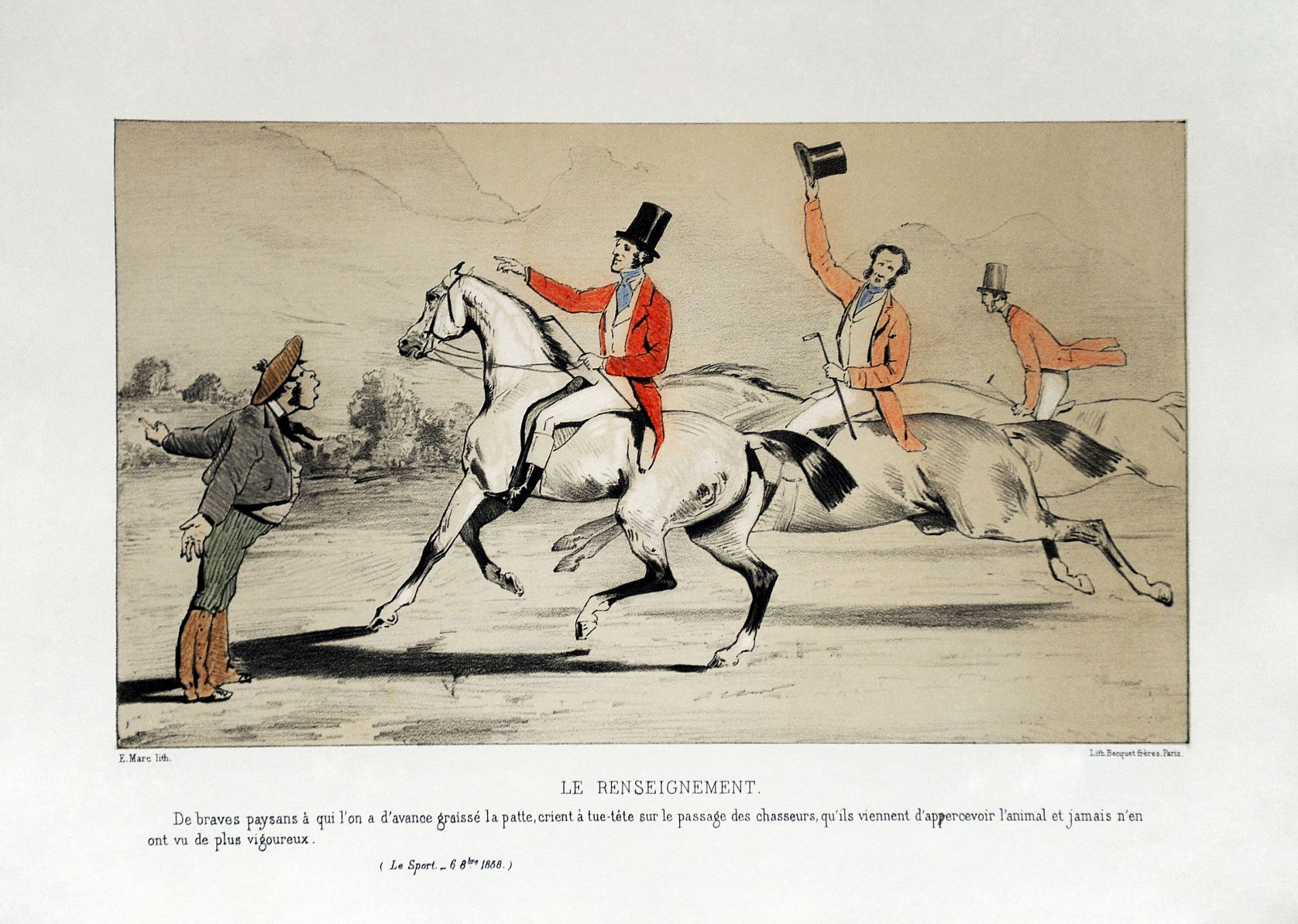
Pierre-Eugène Marc (1819-1885), "Le_Renseignement", 1860, Jasper Hall Livingstone (center) with Richard Lalor Power (left) and Charles Carroll Livingston (right)

Livingston is first recorded as hunting at Pau during the 1847–48 season along with his nephew, Charles Carroll Livingston (1832–1904). Livingston was reported to have been attracted to Pau solely for his passion for fox hunting and "imbibed" into the sport as a young man under George Osbaldeston and Sir Harry Goodricke both Masters of the Quorn Hunt. Livingston was credited with saving the Pau Hunt by purchasing the hounds from Pery Standish of Farley Castle. He was complemented for his management of the Hunt; although, some outsiders criticized him for using "Bagman" foxes that had been captured and released at the beginning of a fox hunt or at the end of a drag hunt, ensuring a kill and the continued viability of the hounds.

Livingston organized the first recorded Drag Hunt at Pau on Saturday, November 26, 1847, on the Route de Tarbes between Pau and Gardères making a distance of 21 km (13 miles) in one hour. This was a welcomed diversion to the actual meet. This method of distraction presented no problem as it was seen as supplementary to the hunt. The Pau Drag Hunt would replace fox hunting on alternating days of the week as foxes became less numerous. Famous participants of the Pau Hunt during his Mastership included William Hamilton, 11th Duke of Hamilton, Ward McAllister and Marshall Pierre Bosquet.

In late 1858, Le Sport Magazine, published an article by the Marquess Théodore de Foudras entitled "Historical Anecdotes of Contemporary Hunting, the state of foreign hunting in Béarn : The Pau Drag Hunt". This article was then mocked with a series of thirteen lithographs by Pierre Eugene Marc (1819–1885) assembled in album form in 1860. The earliest known album copy was signed by J.H. Livingstone on December 10, 1860. Three lithographs by artist A. Duruy were published in subsequent editions.

== Death and legacy ==
Livingston died on March 30, 1900, at the Isle of Wight. In 1907, a memoire written between 1894 and 1896 by Lord Howth, who had served as Master of the Pau Hounds during the 1879–1880 season, was published stating real hunting had ceased at Pau between 1847 and 1863. He scorned that Pau drag hunts ended with the release of a Bagman. He legitimized neither Jasper Hall Livingston nor Richard Francis Lalor Power as Masters of the Pau Hounds during this period and thought it unfortunate young Americans from the "wild-west" had never had the opportunity to hunt wild animals with a pack of hounds.
