= Frederick H. Prince =

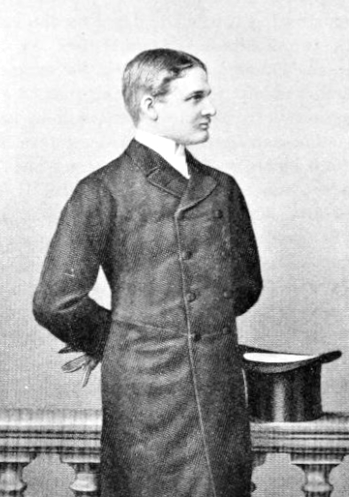
- Born: Frederick Henry Prince; November 30, 1860; Winchester, Massachusetts
- Died: February 2, 1953 (aged 92); Biarritz, France
- Occupations: Stockbroker, banker, financier
- Political party: Republican
- Spouse: Abigail Kinsley Norman (m. 1884; died 1949)
- Children: Frederick Henry Prince Jr.; Norman Prince

Frederick Henry Prince (November 30, 1860 – February 2, 1953) was an American stockbroker, investment banker and financier.

== Early life ==
Prince was born in Winchester, Massachusetts, on November 30, 1860, the son of Frederick O. Prince, former mayor of the city of Boston and Helen Susan (née Henry) Prince. Among his siblings were Gordon Prince, Charles Albert Prince, and Dr. Morton Prince.

He studied at Harvard University, but left in his sophomore year to get an early start in the business world. He acquired a seat on the New York Stock Exchange, on December 10, 1885, and retained his individual membership throughout his life.

== Career ==
Prince made a fortune through his investments in a number of business ventures. Seeing the potential for the stockyard business, during the first decade of the 20th century, he began buying up small companies, merging them into the giant Union Stockyards and Transit Company, of which he was chairman. To ensure control over delivery service to his stockyards, a significant and integral part of the food and tobacco sector, Prince's company acquired outright or held a controlling interest in the Pere Marquette Railway and the Chicago Junction Railway. Combined, these gave his stockyard operations hundreds of miles of rail lines and close to 1,000,000 acres (400,000 ha) of land. In the early 1920s, Prince acquired Armour and Company, one of the country's major slaughterhouses and meatpacking operations.

A friend of Joseph P. Kennedy Sr., Prince helped finance Kennedy's 1925 acquisition of the Robertson-Cole/Film Book Offices, which would evolve into RKO Pictures.

A Republican Party member and delegate to the 1928 convention, Prince aided President Franklin D. Roosevelt efforts to pull America out of the Great Depression of the 1930s. In 1933, he formulated a widely debated program for consolidation for the nation's railroads. Known as the "Prince Plan", it was projected to create savings for the nation's railroads of $740 million annually. The plan was rejected, because it would have thrown thousands of workers out of their jobs. This experience led him to also propose sweeping changes in the United States Constitution to make the president more independent.

=== Sportsman ===
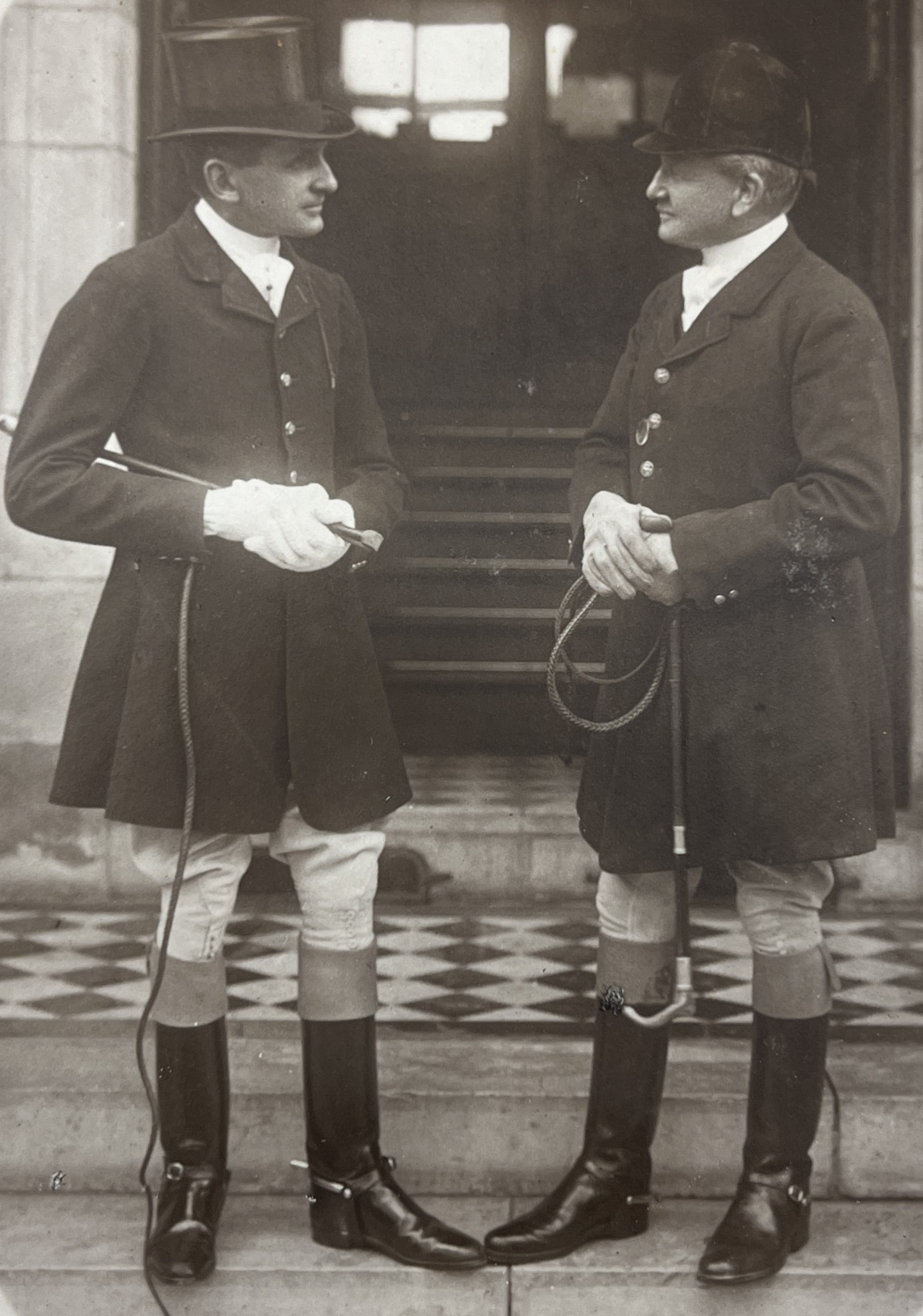
Joseph "Pito" Barron and Frederick Henry Prince before a meet of the Pau Hunt

Prince was a member of the New York Yacht Club, he owned the Weetamoe, a J-class yacht. The Weetamoe competed for a berth in the America's Cup, losing in the 1934 trials to the ultimate winner Harold Stirling Vanderbilt and his yacht, Rainbow.

He owned a large number of horses and established numerous riding trails and carriage roads on his Princemere estate in Wenham. Prince was one of the nine founding members of the National Steeplechase Association, created in 1895 to organize competitive steeplechase racing.

In Pau, where he had a villa, he served as the master of foxhounds for the Pau Hunt from 1910 to 1939 and was a generous member of the English Club.

== Personal life ==
In 1884, Prince was married to Abigail Kinsley Norman (1860–1949), a daughter of George H. Norman and Abby Durfee (née Kinsley) Norman of Newport. Together, they had two sons:

- Frederick Henry Prince Jr. (1885–1962), who married Elizabeth Harding, a daughter of William P. G. Harding, in 1917. They divorced and she married Eugene Van Rensselaer Thayer and he married Virginia Lucy (née Mitchell) Higginson, a daughter of Clarence Blair Mitchell and widow of James J. Higginson Jr.
- Norman Prince (1887–1916), who died while flying with the Lafayette Escadrille in World War I.

He died in Biarritz on February 2, 1953.

=== Residences ===
The Princes had a number of significant residences. They had a home in Biarritz, and a villa in Pau, Pyrénées-Atlantiques, France, known as Villa Sainte-Hélène (today the residence of the Préfet des Pyrénées-Atlantiques).

He had a home in Boston, including Princemere, a 994 acres (402 ha) estate at Wenham, Massachusetts he purchased in the 1890s. On the estate, he built a stone mansion in 1911. He also had a home in Aiken, South Carolina.

In 1932, Prince bought Marble House at Newport, Rhode Island from Mrs. Oliver Hazard Perry Belmont (formerly Alva Vanderbilt). They had previously rented Crossways, the former Stuyvesant Fish estate that was then owned by Mrs. Morris de Peyster.

=== Legacy ===
In 1947, Frederick H. Prince and his wife established the Prince Charitable Trusts, that was a benefactor to various philanthropic endeavors in the city of Chicago, Washington, D.C., and the state of Rhode Island.

Following his death, Gordon College relocated to the Princemere estate in 1955. Today, his former home is known as Frost Hall and houses many of the college's faculty and administrative offices, as well as the Admissions Department.
