= William Thorn =

William Thorn may refer to:

- William Thorn (politician) (1852–1935), Australian politician, member of the Legislative Assembly for Queensland
- William Knapp Thorn (1848–1910), polo player and grandson of Commodore Cornelius Vanderbilt
