= Frances Elizabeth Barrow =

American children's writer

- Born: Frances Elizabeth Mease; February 22, 1822; Charleston, South Carolina
- Died: May 7, 1894 (aged 72); New York City
- Resting place: Woodlawn Cemetery (Bronx, New York)
- Other name: "Frankie Blue"
- Occupation: Author
- Spouse(s): James Barrow, Jr. (m. 1841; died 1868)
- Writing career
- Pen name: Aunt Fanny
- Language: English
- Genre: Children's literature

Frances Elizabeth Barrow (née Mease; pen name, Aunt Fanny; February 22, 1822 – May 7, 1894) was a 19th-century American children's writer and novelist. Born in Charleston, South Carolina, she began writing books for children under the nom de plume "Aunt Fanny" in 1855. She authored a total of twenty-five books, some of which were translated in Europe, including Six Night Caps, Aunt Fanny's Story Book, and Take Heed. Barrow also wrote the novels, The Wife's Stratagem and The Letter G.

== Biography ==
Frances ("Frankie Blue") Elizabeth Mease was born in Charleston, South Carolina, February 22, 1822. Her parents were Charles Benton Mease, of Charleston, and Sarah Matilda Graham of Boston. Barrow's sister, Alexina Black Mease married Richard Grant White in 1850.

Barrow's nom de plume of "Aunt Fanny", first appeared in 1855, when she began to write books for children. There were twenty-five in all, and some were translated in Europe. They included Six Night Caps, Aunt Fanny's Story Book, Four Little Hearts, and Take Heed. Barrow also wrote The Wife's Stratagem, a novel, and The Letter G.

On December 7, 1841, she married James Barrow Jr. He was a founder of the English Club of Pau and died there at the age of 53 at Maison Labeyrie, rue Bernadotte, Pau, France, November 18, 1868 and was interred in Pau. She died at 30 East Thirty-fifth street, in New York City on May 7, 1894. The interment was in Woodlawn Cemetery. Two daughters, Mrs. S. L. Holly and Mrs. Theodore Connoly, survived her.

== Selected works ==
=== Children's literature ===
- Aunt Fanny's Story Book
- Big nightcap Letters
- The birdnests' stories
- Daisy & Dot
- Fairy nightcaps, 1861
- Four Little Hearts
- Little nightcaps, 1861
- Stories told in the wood, 1864
- Take Heed

=== Novels ===
- The Letter G
- The Wife's Stratagem
