= Edward C. Post =

American heir and art collector (1845–1915)

- Born: Edward Church Post; September 9, 1845; Paris, France
- Died: July 5, 1915 (aged 69); New York City, New York, U.S.
- Spouse: Emilie Thorn King (m. 1895)
- Parent(s): Edward Post; Clementine Church Post
- Relatives: George B. Post (cousin)

Edward Church Post (September 9, 1845 – July 5, 1915) was an American heir and art collector who was prominent in New York society during the Gilded Age.

== Early life ==
Post was born in Paris, France on September 9, 1845. He was the son of Edward Post (1823–1851), a graduate of New York University, and Clementine (née Church) Post (1824–1887). After his father's death in 1851, his mother remarried to his uncle, Wright Eli Post. His sister, Mary Alma Post, died young, and his brother, Frederick Alfred Post, was married to Harriet Bininger (daughter of Abraham Bininger)

His paternal grandparents were Joel Post and Alma (née Floyd) Post, who was a sister of U.S. Representative Charles A. Floyd. Besides his stepfather, who was his uncle, his paternal aunt was Anne (née Post) Livermore. His uncle John Alexander Post married Adeline Forbes. They lived at and were buried at Pau, France, where their eldest son, John Morris Post, served as American vice-consul. Their youngest son, Alexander Post, married Elizabeth Wadsworth, the daughter of General James S. Wadsworth. His maternal grandparents were Captain William Church and Abigail (née Mauran) Church. His maternal aunt, Abby Mauran Church, was married his paternal uncle, Joel Browne Post, the parents of architect George B. Post, Edward's first cousin.

== Society life ==
In 1882, Post moved to America to reside permanently. In 1892, Post, who had yet to marry, was included in Ward McAllister's "Four Hundred", purported to be an index of New York's best families, published in The New York Times. Conveniently, 400 was the number of people that could fit into Mrs. Astor's ballroom. Post was a member of the Knickerbocker Club, the Century Club, the New York Yacht Club, the Newport Reading Room and the Clambake Club of Newport.

Post was an avid collector of art, including paintings (including a portrait of Marie Thérèse de Bourbon likely by Jean Petitot), drawings, miniatures, and objects in gold, silver, enamel, marble and bronze. After his death, his collection was donated to the Metropolitan Museum of Art in New York.

== Personal life ==
In 1895, Post was married to Emilie Thorn King (d. 1948). Emilie was the daughter of Edward King and Emma Sophia (née Thorn) King, the niece of William Knapp Thorn Jr. and the granddaughter of Emily Almira (née Vanderbilt) Thorn (a daughter of Commodore Cornelius Vanderbilt). They maintained a home in New York City, at 350 West End Avenue, and one in Newport, Rhode Island on, known as "Needwood" on Parker Avenue.

Post died from complications affecting his heart at his home in Newport on Bellevue Court on July 5, 1915. His funeral was held at Emmanuel Church and he was buried at Woodlawn Cemetery in the Bronx. His widow converted to the Catholic faith in 1912, and later donated her Newport home, named Stoneleigh on Narragansett Avenue, to the Father General of the Carmelite order for use as a monastery in 1930, after which Father Paschasius, master of its House of Novices at New Orleans became the spiritual director of the monastery. Mrs. Post died at her home in Buckfast, Devonshire, England in March 1948.
