= English Club of Pau, France =

Private social club in Pau, France

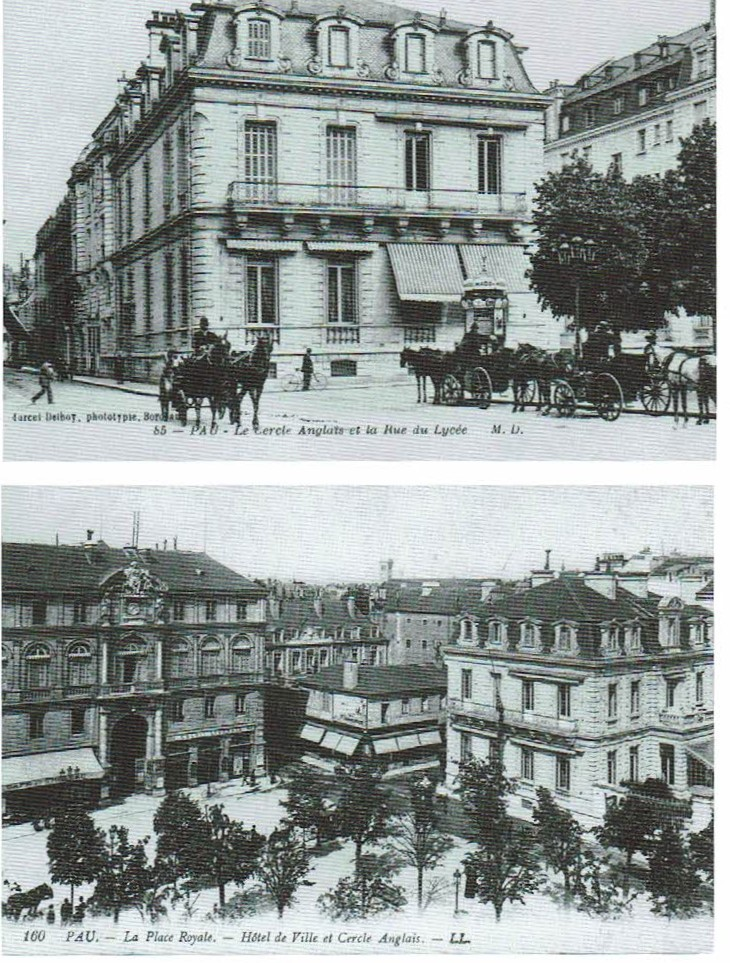
Early 20th century postcards of the English Club, Place Royale, Pau

The English Club of Pau (French: le Cercle anglais) is a private social club in Pau, France. It owns and conserves a decorative arts and book collection listed as a French monument historique (ISMH). The English Club’s mission includes an annual open house during the Journées de Patrimoine (European Heritage Days) and for reserved non-profit group tours, conferences, member publications and club member activities, all concentrated on the education and promotion of Pau’s former Anglo-American colony. It is housed at the Villa Lawrance by the City of Pau.

== History ==
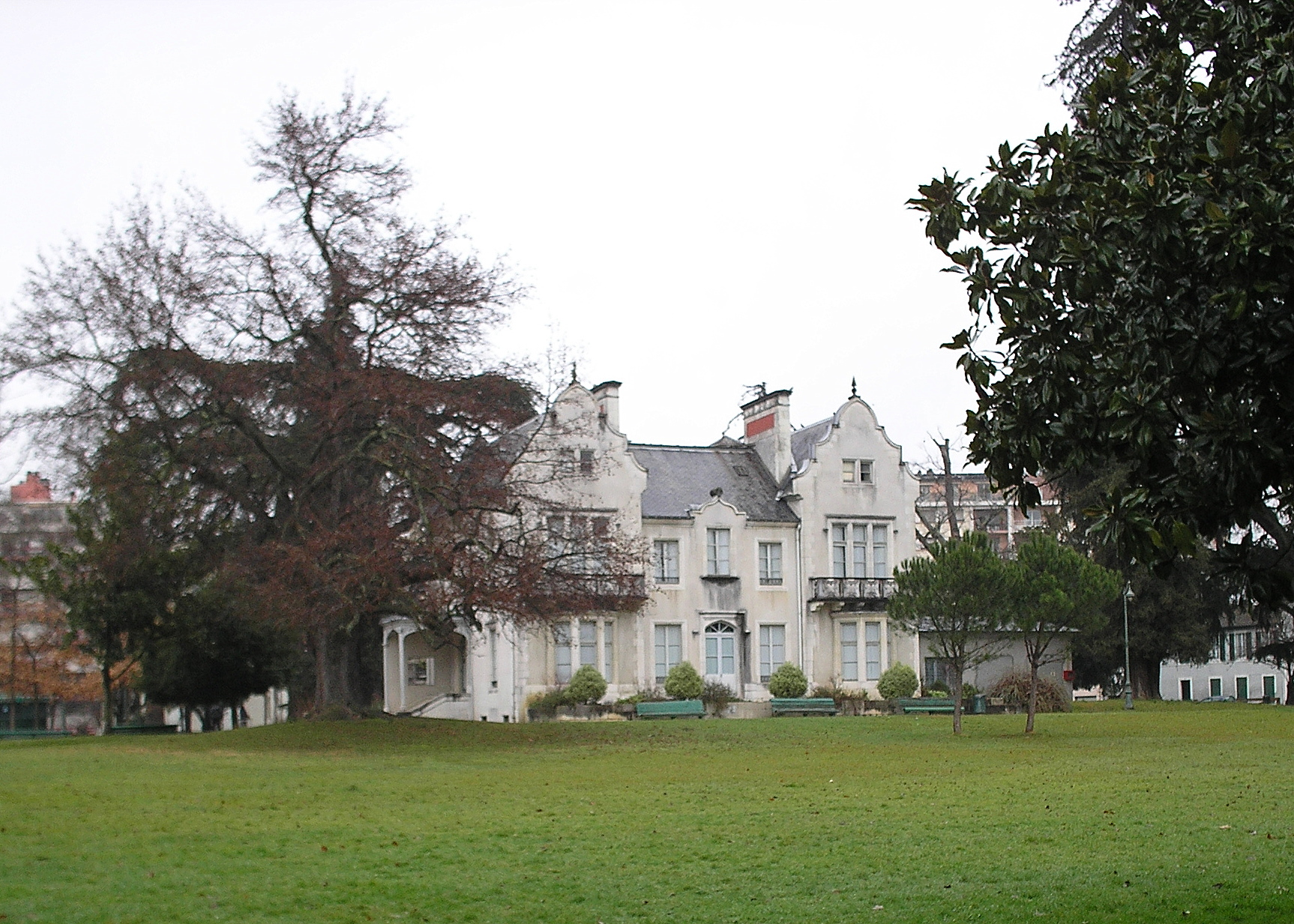
La villa Lawrance, historical property of the city of Pau, residence of the Cercle Anglais and the Académie de Béarn

A British Colony men’s reading room dating back to 1828 was chartered February 26, 1856 as the English Literary Society (Société Littéraire Anglaise) which became The English Club in 1859. (Note: The legend of the Duke of Wellington at Pau obscures the true history of the tourist colony at Pau.) Originally, the club was located at la Place Royale. It then moved across the Place Royale in 1871 to the building that would be its home until 1957 when it moved into the main salon of the former Hotel Gassion. Addition moves in 1990 to the Villa Regina, then the Villa Riquoir in 1996. In 2002, the City of Pau agreed to host the English Club and its collections at Villa Lawrance. For many years, members were permitted to list the English Club as the seat for sporting clubs, including the Pau Hunt, Polo Club and Pau Golf Club.

== Collection ==
The collection includes 19th and early 20th century English language books (mostly housed at the municipal archives). The English Club’s art collection includes works by Allen Culpepper Sealy (1850-1927), Jean Heîd « Hed » (1890-1957), Harry La Montagne (1869-1959) Paul Mirat (1885 – 1966), Viscount Henri de Vaufreland (1873 – 1957) and Eugene Blocaille (1873 - 1961). It also includes horse racing, cross county and steeple chase memorabilia of the Pau Hunt and portraits of past members.

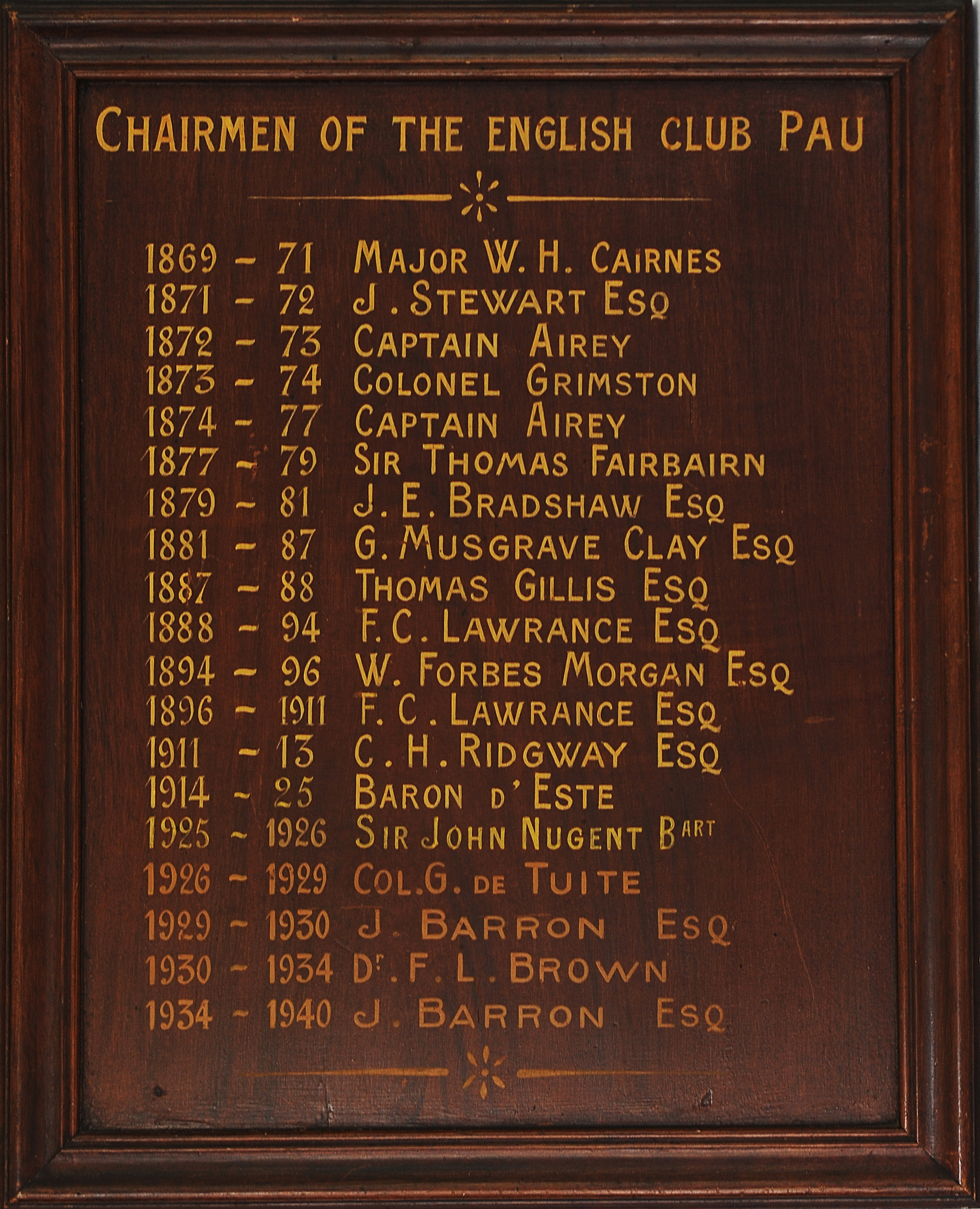
Chairmen of the English Club

== Notable members and honored guests ==
- René d'Astorg (1860-1940) - explorer of the Pyrenees
- Captain James Barrow (founder) (died 1868) - Husband of Frances Elizabeth Barrow, pen name Aunt Fanny.
- Belle Baruch1 (1899-1964) - American equestrian, philanthropist
- James Gordon Bennett Jr. (1841-1918) - publisher of the New York Herald
- Sir Victor Brooke (1843-1891) - Anglo-Irish naturalist and baronet
- Coco Chanel (1883-1971) - French fashion designer
- Lord John Yarde-Buller, 2nd Baron Churston (1846-1910) - British peer and soldier.
- Lord Howth (1827-1909) - Irish peer
- Harry La Montagne (1869-1959) - French-American horse owner, artist, sculptor, war veteran and sportsman
- Jasper Hall Livingston (1815-1900) - American horse owner, gentleman rider and sportsman
- Ward McAllister (1827-1895) - popular arbiter of social taste in 19th-century America
- Sir Alfred Munnings (1878-1959) - English painter of horses
- Sir John Nugent, 3rd Baronet of Cloncoskoran (1849-1929) - lived at Cloncoskoraine, County Waterford, Ireland; died at Pau
- Frederick Henry Prince (1860-1953) - American stockbroker, investment banker and financier
- Norman Prince (1887-1916) - American aviator
- Charles Henry Ridgway (1897-1916) - British army
- Sir Henry Russell (1834–1909) - pioneer explorer of Pyrenees
- General Thomas Montagu Steele (1820-1890) - British army officer
- Dr. Alexander Taylor (1802–1879) - Scottish physician and author
- Lt.-Col. John Talbot Darnley Talbot-Crosbie (1843-1899) - Justice of the Peace for County Kerry; lived at Ardfert Abbey, County Kerry; died at Pau
- William Knapp Thorn (1848-1910) - American champion polo player
