= Conniver =

American-bred Thoroughbred racehorse

- Sire: Discovery
- Grandsire: Display
- Dam: The Schemer
- Damsire: Challenger
- Sex: Filly
- Foaled: 1944
- Country: United States
- Colour: Brown
- Breeder: Alfred G. Vanderbilt II
- Owner: Harry La Montagne
- Trainer: William Post
- Record: 56: 15-3-6
- Earnings: $227,825

Major wins
- Beldame Handicap (1948); Brooklyn Handicap (1948); Comely Handicap (1948); Vagrancy Handicap (1948)

Awards
- American Champion Older Female Horse (1948)
- Last updated on August 27, 2008

Conniver (1944–1970) was an American Thoroughbred racehorse who was voted the 1948 American Champion Older Female Horse. Bred by Alfred G. Vanderbilt II, she was purchase as a yearling by New York City businessman and sculptor, Harry La Montagne.

When her racing days were over, Conniver was used as a broodmare. Of her six foals, Clandestine and Plotter won important American Graded stakes races.
