= Paul Mirat =

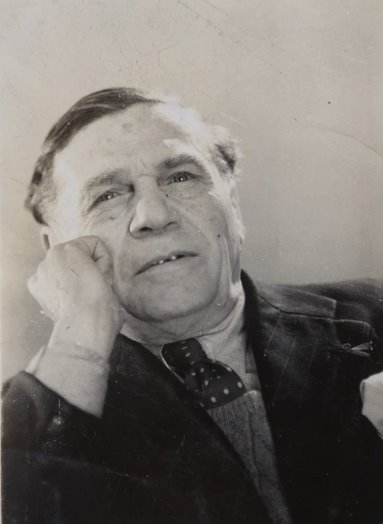
- Paul Mirat
- Born: Basile Paul Mirat; January 24, 1885; Pau, France
- Died: June 7, 1966; Meillon, France
- Spouse: Maria-Elisa "Léla" Larrague (m. 1918)
- Children: Jacques Mirat; Claude Mirat; Yves Mirat; Michel Mirat
- Parent(s): Lucie Lacaze; Lambert Mirat

Basile-Paul Mirat (born January 24, 1885 – July 6, 1966) was an owner of a thoroughbred stud farm, military instructor in the United States, president of the Chamber of Agriculture of the Basses-Pyrénées, journalist and mayor of Meillon. He was also a musician, artist, poet and sportsman. (Note: Paul Mirat played the flute, was a caricaturist, painter, poet, gentleman rider, boxing champion of the French South-West and a bobsledder)

== Family and youth ==
The Mirat family of Meillon is listed in the first Béarn census ordered by Gaston Febus in 1386. Around 1830, Paul's grandfather, Jean Mirat (1817-1893), owned the auberge "Relais de la Poste" and raised remount horses.

Paul Mirat's father, Lambert Mirat (1841-1921), married Lucie Lacaze (1859-1940); he created his stud farm in Meillon in 1890. Doubling as an entrepreneur, he founded a marble factory on the Néez, in Gan. Associated with the brewer Octave Heid, they created the first hydroelectric power station on the Gave de Pau that supplied electricity to Pau during the Belle Époque. Also associated with Raphaël Milliès-Lacroix, they founded four furniture stores "A la Ville de Londres", in Dax, Mont-de-Marsan, Biarritz and Pau. In Meillon, Lambert bred Béarnese cattle and thoroughbred horses. He also served as deputy mayor of Pau under Henri Faisans.

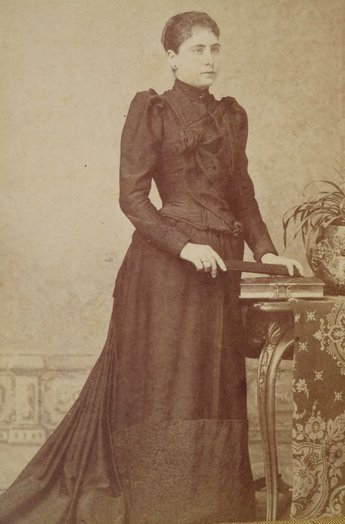
Paul's Mother, Lucie Lacaze (1859-1940)

Paul Mirat had two brothers: Gaston (1881-1955), who took over the family store in Pau. Musician and musicologist, he travelled the Pyrenean valleys collecting the music and lyrics of traditional Béarnese songs. Deputy Mayor of Pau under Gaston Lacoste, Gaston Mirat founded the School of Music of Pau in 1921, and in 1923 participated in the creation of the Academy of Béarn alongside Doctor Georges Sabatier. The youngest sibling, Jean Mirat (1899-1959), was Chevalier of the Legion of Honor, doctor of law, barrister for the Paris Court of Appeal, member and designated president of the French Bar, recipient of the Horace Helbronner prize (1925), and author of L’obligation alimentaire entre époux en cas de divorce (1930) (Maintenance Obligations Between Spouses in the Event of Divorce (1930)).

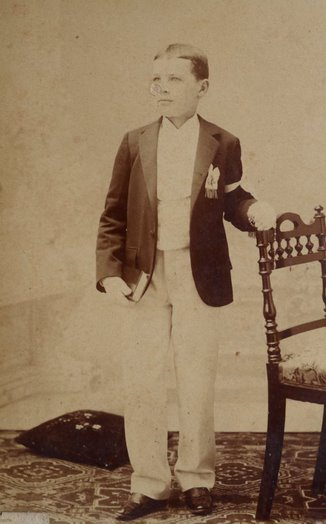
Paul Mirat, 1895

In 1898, disciplined and expelled from high school at Pau, Paul Mirat was sent to Paris to continue his studies at the Collège Stanislas, joining his brother Gaston, who had been a medical student. The two brothers settled in the heart of Montmartre from 1898 to 1902 where they studied at the Schola Cantorum: Gaston was enrolled in composition, Paul took flute lessons. Back in Pau, Paul Mirat fulfilled his military service obligations in the time between 1903 and 1906. He received a commendation from the Prefect for having courageously stopped a runaway team of horses. Before the age of 20, he won the Toulouse horse show, on one of his father's mares.

Pau was at the time one of the most prestigious winter resorts in the world, the city was nicknamed "The Queen of Sports". Horse racing, the Pau Hunt, the aviation school founded by the Wright brothers, the English Club, the "Palais Beaumont", the "Pavillon des Arts" attracted the budding young artist who sketched foreigners on vacation, and also local daily life. With Henri de Montebello and Louis Sallenave, Paul Mirat created a theater troupe, "Le Carillon". His India ink caricatures were published in the local press, immortalizing the winter colony during the Belle Époque, as well as teams of horses, mail-coaches, tilburies, fiacres, Victorias, landaus, and early automobiles.

In 1906, freed from military obligations, Paul Mirat went to Mexico where his uncle Maurice Lacaze, a polytechnician, was responsible for railway security in Veracruz. He took the opportunity to travel the American continent for two years, visiting Paraíso, Tampico, Arizona, Baja California, and New York. He stayed in Scotland and Ireland before settling in London, from 1908 to 1914, as a sketch artist at Swan and Edgar on Piccadily Circus.

== World War I ==
=== At war with the 83e RI and the 156e RIP ===
When World War I broke out, Mirat left London and returned to Pau. On August 11, 1914, he joined the stationed in Toulouse and Saint-Gaudens and was moved to the front under the command of Colonel Breton. With the French 22nd Division, he fought in the Battle of Ardennes, the First Battle of the Marne and at Sompuis, Omey before occupying the village of Perthe-lès-Hurlus. Mirat was named corporal on October 10, 1914. They then engaged in Champagne during the winter of 1914-1915 then in Artois until January 1916, the 83rd Infantry Regiment was then given the task of reinforcing Avocourt and then west of Verdun. Mirat was then transferred to the 156th Infantry Division. He was wounded in the left shoulder during the German offensives of April 1916 at Cumières-le-Mort-Homme.

=== French Free Corps ===
Appointed sergeant on June 12, 1916, Paul Mirat volunteered for regiment's free corps. He carried out many perilous missions in unison with British troops, enabling him to demonstrate the finest military qualities and earning him a "citation à l'ordre" of the brigade.

Once upon a time, my hands were white
I loved the flowers, the woods, the fields
Never daring to ravish the branches’ fruits
I loved the birds and their song.
Once upon a time, my hands were white
Distracted student, I dreamt
Of the long vacations, the short Sundays
My exams were poor.
Once upon a time, my hands were white
And every day in my garden
Trampled frosted periwinkles
Dreaming of peace, dreaming of love.
Today if my hands are black
It's because a rifle burns my fingers
How beauteous those stories are
Which the bullets sometimes whistle.
Paul Mirat, October 22, 2016, The hands’ Destiny, The red hours

=== Instructor with the American Army ===
On September 10, 1917, Sergeant Mirat was appointed to a French military mission being sent to the United States, that had entered the war in April. In October, Paul Mirat arrived at Camp Lewis, where, under the orders of Captain J. Camille Champion (256th RI/23rd Company), Mirat trained troops of the newly created 91st division. The French moved to quickly instruct around 40,000 men, along with a British delegation in charge of trench training, chemical warfare and the use of machine guns. At first, Sergeant Mirat was given 200 non-commissioned officers, before taking responsibility for the formation of the Free Corps.

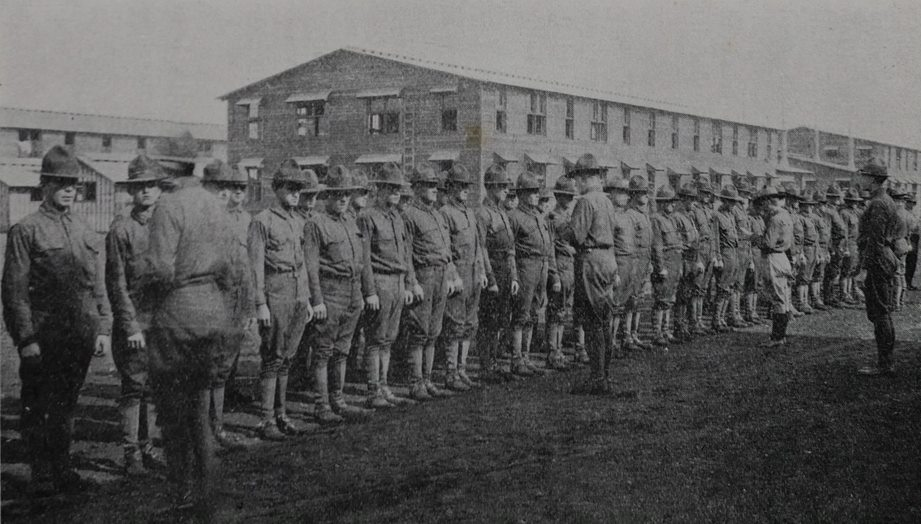
Camp Lewis 1917

A battle training field was built and after ten months, the 91st Division left to fight in France.

Mirat was appointed as a delegate to fight "enemy propaganda" in the northwestern United States and Canada. He was received at universities, industrial and commercial clubs, sometimes with crowds approaching 10,000, he defended France's altercation with Germany. With his outspokenness, Paul describes the battlefield of the Somme:

"It's so easy," he said, "when one is warm and comfortable, to say: 'Move the artillery two miles to the east', but the Somme sector was a sea of mud. It was waist deep, and horses and automobiles useless, and men almost so. I have seen 35 horses and 50 men dragging at the same piece of light artillery."

"When a shell falls it sends a cloud of muddy spray and digs its way into the soft mud and leaves a crater that is a death-trap. Men fall into these craters and never come out alive. The mud pulls them down, and further down, until they are smothered. We lost many that way. I have seen six and eight men striving in vain to pull a single comrade from a shell crater."
"It was cold last winter, colder than usual, and the mud froze to our bodies, and as we floundered back and forth in the snow and sleet of the night the "Boche" shells scattered steel death in our midst."
“But,” and his voice was triumphant, “all this is nothing compared to the suffering endured by the Germans. For every shell fired at us we threw back 10 and hammered at him till his [sic] feeble artillery had to stop."

American to Seal Hun's Fate, The Seattle Star, November 17, 1917

=== Back in France ===
In July 1918, barely landed back in France, this unit engaged in the offensive while Paul Mirat participated in several Freikorps missions with the 156th French Infantry Division. Transferred to the 19th Train Squadron shortly after the armistice, he was demobilized on March 2, 1919. Admitted to the territorial army reserve on October 1, 1922, he was released from all military obligations on February 17, 1928, at the age of 43 years old. Holder of the Croix de guerre 1914-1918 with the bronze star, he was awarded the French Military Medal.

== Interwar Period ==
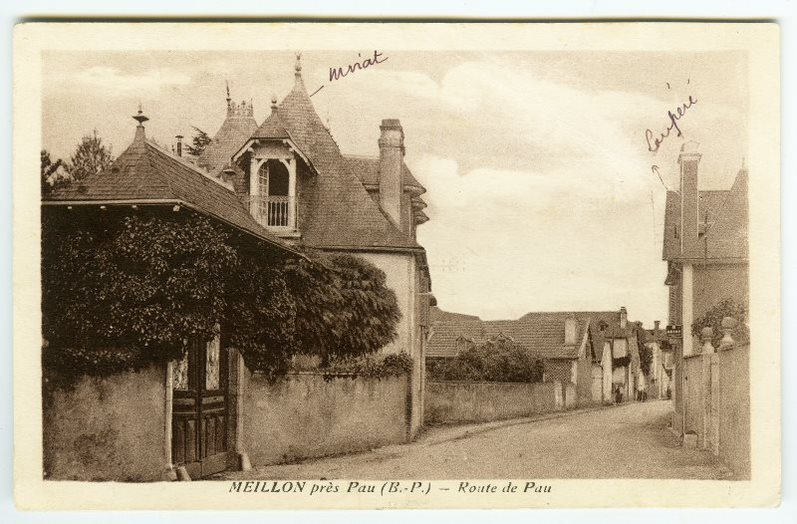
Mirat Home, Meillon, 1946

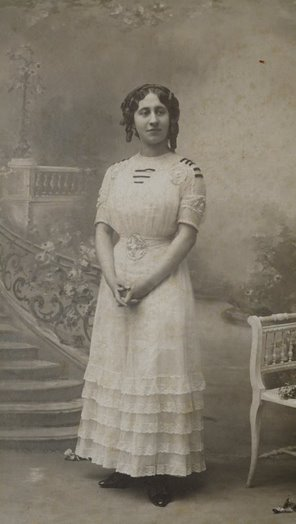
Léla Mirat

On September 22, 1918, while on leave, Paul married Maria Elisa "Léla" Larrague, who was born in Bahía Blanca in 1895 and died at Meillon in 1968. They had four children, Jacques (1919-1993), Claude (1920-1930), Yves (1931-1995) and Michel (1928-2015) and settled in Meillon where Paul took over his father's stables, successfully horseracing at several tracks throughout France. He was elected president of the Basses-Pyrénées Horse Riding Union and wrote article for the magazines "Auteuil Longchamp" and "Le Jockey". President of the Chamber of Agriculture of the Basses-Pyrénées, he ordered studies on breeding, water and soil protection, hedge conservation and warned of the dangers of “all corn”, advocating sustainable agriculture.

More so than his work as a poet or as a painter, Paul's sketches were the most popular, with his first exhibit taling place in 1920 at the Palais des Pyrénées. During this period, he mainly produced oil paintings inspired in particular by visits to Spain and Italy.

On October 3, 1928, Pau's Dutournier bank declared insolvency, ruining Paul Mirat, whose furniture, paintings, bronzes and books sold at auction in the courtyard of his stables while the family played bridge in the garden.

In March 1933, he joined the editorial staff of the weekly "Vu" founded by Lucien Vogel and signed onto an investigation into the rise of fascism in Italy. Mussolini granted him an hour-long interview, which was published in its entirety. In "Memories and Impressions of Travel, Mission in Fascist Italy", Mirat later wrote, "It was in all objectivity and leaving aside any partisan idea that I wanted to learn during a mission in fascist Italy about the causes of Mussolini's rapid rise to the post of dictator. I can't wait to make contact with this man, to see him, to hear him, because intelligence consists in trying to understand what is most contrary to us."

It's the beauteous season Around my house
When the flowing wisteria
Cascade on the flowering roses
That border the yellow sandy path.
It's the beauteous season
Around my house
When upon the swallows’ return
I hear their joyous cry, their flapping wings
Coming fearless
To nest under my old roof.
It's the beauteous season
Around my house
When my heart filled with tenderness,
I see my three children in their splendid youth
Playing on the lawn
Around my house.
Paul Mirat, It's the beauteous Season, Under the Southern Sun

== Mayor of Meillon 1935-1945 ==
On June 16, 1935, Paul Mirat was elected mayor of Meillon. Envisioning a new war looming, he wrote, “Today everything is swept away by a torrent of fire that is sweeping over our miserable planet. Not a cry dares rise in the light of the storm. The eyes are dry with tears. Destructive madness dominates debate and inflames the hearts of men." In April 1937, in the midst of the Spanish Civil War, he carried out a mission in Irun to negotiate the exchange of the imprisoned aviator Pelletier, noting, "I recognize those gazes where the past is extinguished, where the present becomes a tragic reality, where the future lights the imprecise flame of possible hopes... I recognize them, they are indeed those of the Somme, those of Verdun...”.

When the first Spanish Civil War refugees crossed the border, the Mirats immediately opened their home and urged every family in Meillon to do the same. From 1937, they converted the house, stables and barns into makeshift refuges. In June 1940, the village was home to several hundred refugees of all nationalities. From late 1940 to mid-1942, about two hundred Jews from the Gurs internment camp were authorized to live in Meillon in assigned residences, from a few weeks to a few months. Most tried to leave France, some obtaining visas for the United States or Cuba, others were able to escape thanks to organizations, such as the Œuvre de secours aux enfants (Children's Aid Society), abbreviated "OSE". In 1939, Paul Mirat began an official register and collected the identity cards of each person arriving in the town. (Note: Thanks to this register Meillon refugee information can be shared with family members and researchers.)

== Works ==
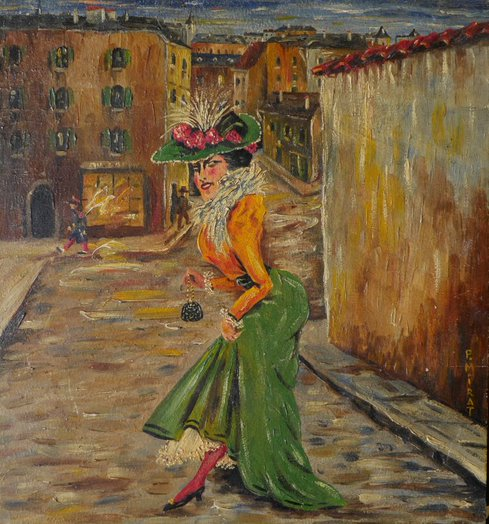

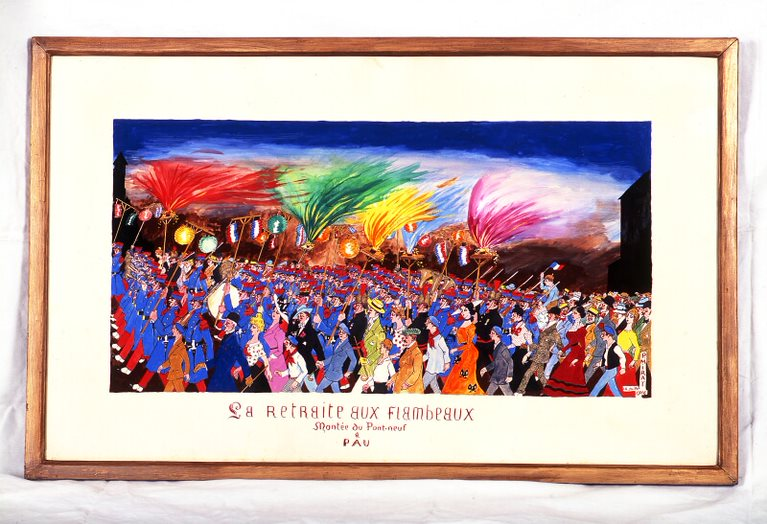

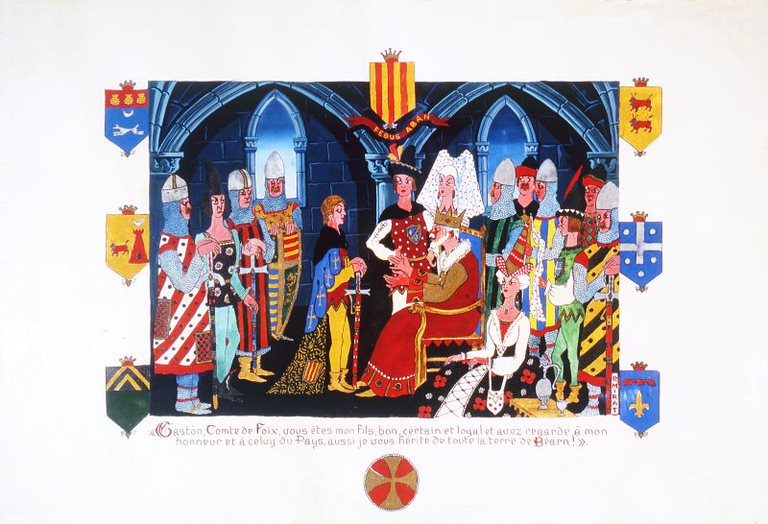

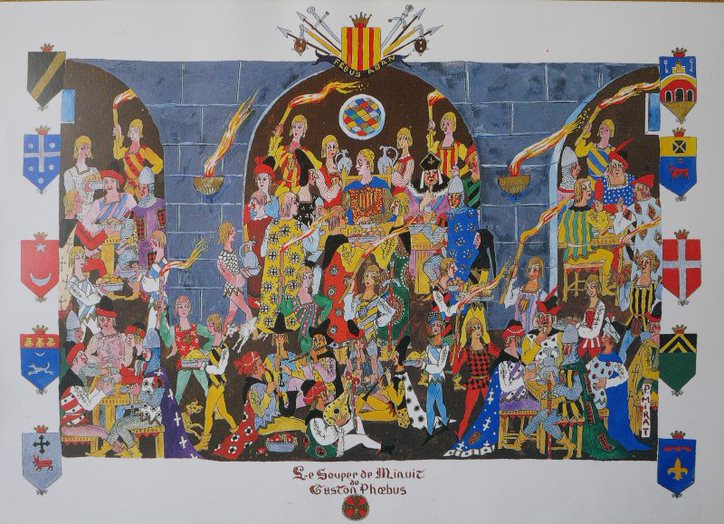

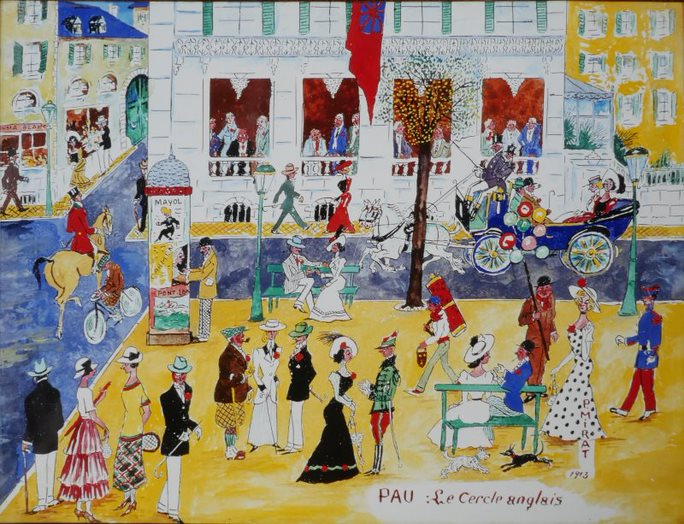
Paul Mirat, le Cercle Anglais (English Club)

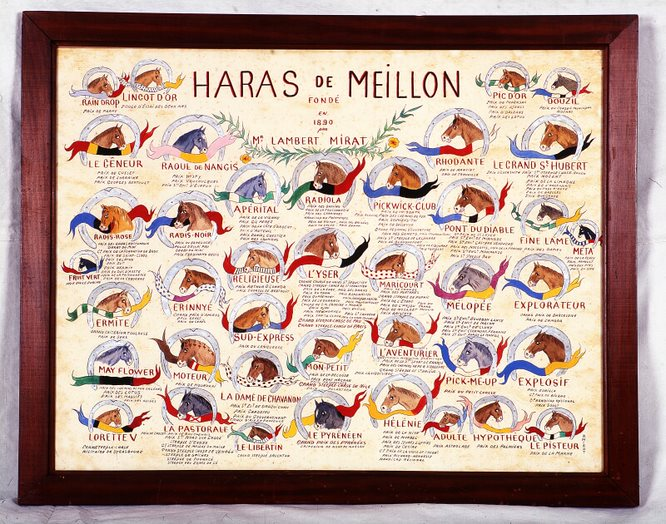

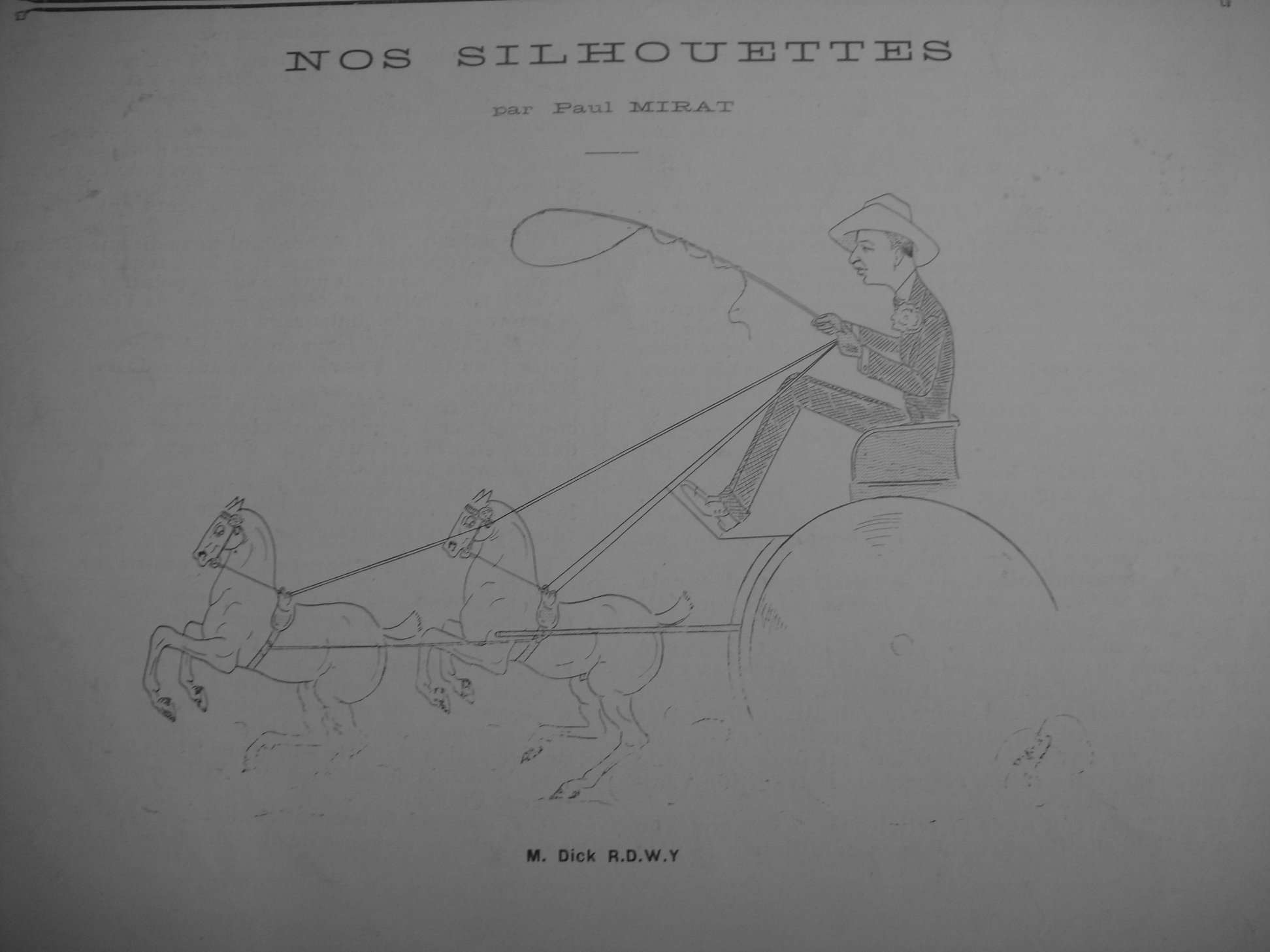
Dick Ridgway.

== Photos ==
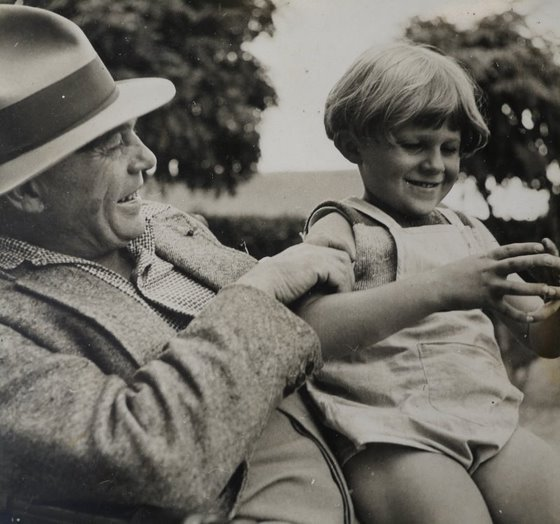
Paul Mirat with his son Michel

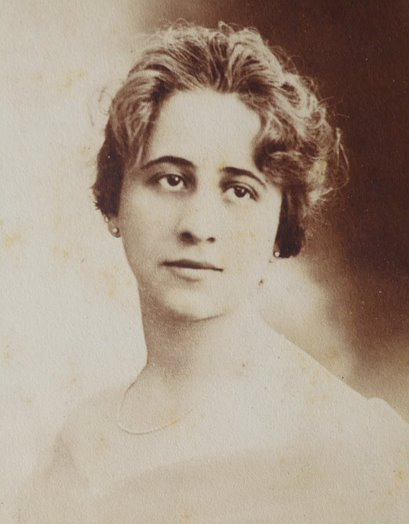
Léla Mirat

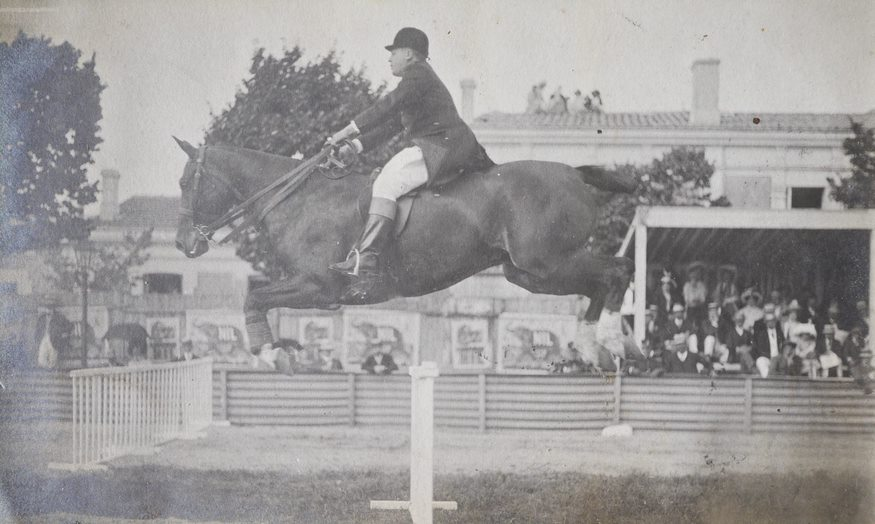
Paul Mirat winning at Royan (1903)

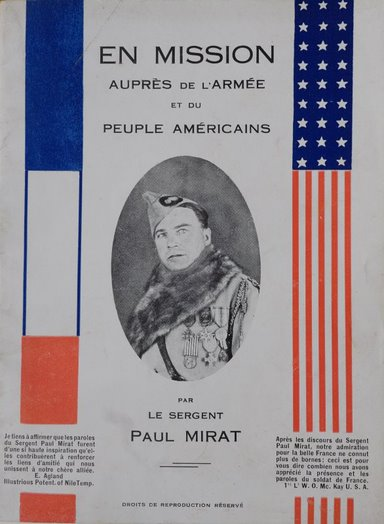

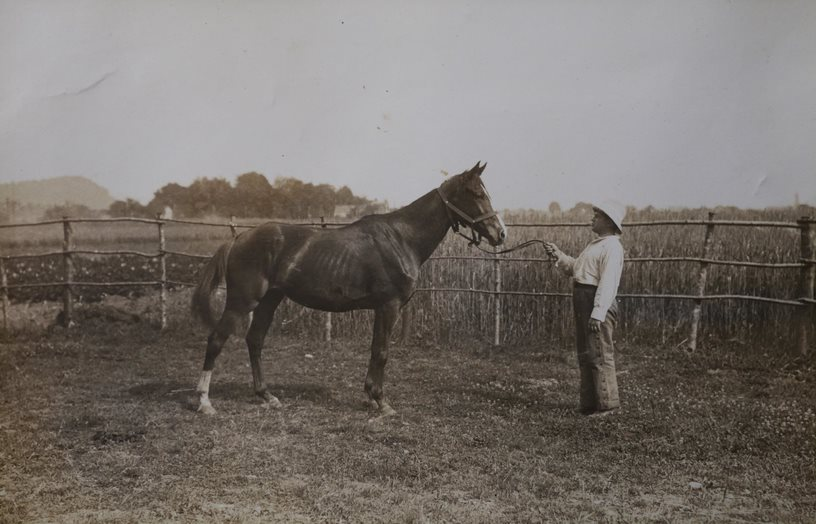
Paul Mirat in Argentina 1920

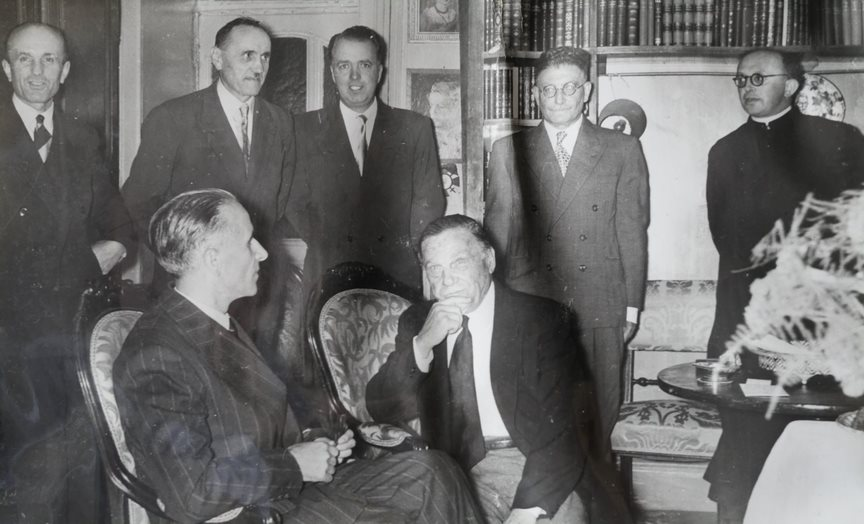
Paul Mirat receives the Légion of Honneur, 1953

== Publications (In French) ==
- La chanson des épées, Paul Mirat, Sergent au 156ème Régiment d’Infanterie, Imprimerie, Lithographie Garet-Haristoy, Pau, 1917.
- Sous le casque, éditions Empérauger, Pau, 1917.
- En Mission auprès de l'Armée et du Peuple Américains, Éditions Lescher-Moutoué, Pau, sans date.
- Les heures rouges, Illustrations d'Ernest Gabard. Société du livre d'Art Ancien et Moderne,6, rue de Savoie. Paris. 1925. (réédition de nombreux poèmes de la Chanson des épées).
- Au soleil du Midi, Illustration d'Ernest Gabard, Société du livre d'Art et Moderne. Paris, 1927.
- Silhouettes. Imprimerie Moderne, Pau, 1927.
- Pau, Capitale du Cheval, Éditions l'Indépendant, Pau, 1932.
- Au choc des vérités, Illustrations P. Mirat. Imprimeries Modernes, Éditions P. Mirat, 1933.
- La route embrasée, Illustrations Ernest Gabard et P. Mirat. Marrimpouey Jeune, Pau, 1937.
- Aux jours heureux de ma bonne Ville, Illustrations E. Gabard, Imprimerie Marrimpouey Jeune, Pau, 1939.
- IVème centenaire de la naissance d'Henri IV. Pau, 1953. Poème dédié à Vincent Auriol et tous les Français du monde. I.C.P. 1953
- Fédération des raids hippiques de France, Le raid hippique français, Statuts, règlements, catalogue. Articles de Paul Mirat, président de la fédération des Basses-Pyrénées, P. Mirat en couverture (Ph. NE.).
- Publicité de Paul et Yves Mirat pour la production d'imageries historiques pour mairies et restaurants. Imprimerie Marrimpouey Jeune, Pau, 1953.
- Souvenirs et Impressions de voyages, Imprimerie commerciale de la IV° République des Pyrénées, Pau, sans date.
- Le Sistre d'Airain, I.C.P, 11 rue Joffre, Pau, 1963

== Distinctions ==
- Chevalier de la Légion d’honneur, le 15 octobre 1953
- Médaille militaire
- Croix de guerre 1914-1918
- Officier des Palmes académiques
- Commandeur du Mérite agricole
