= Harry La Montagne =

American sculptor

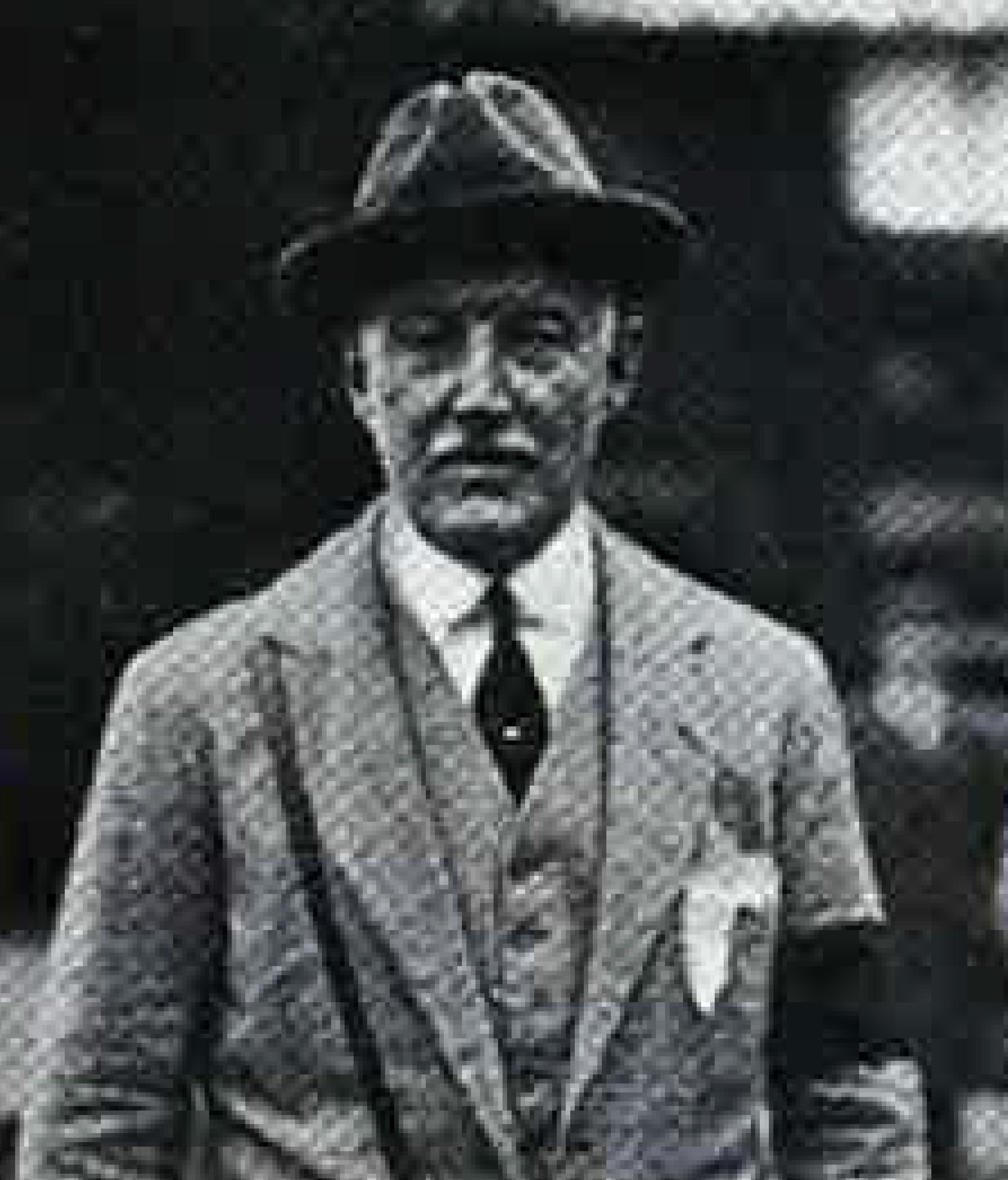
Harry La Montagne

Harry Austen La Montagne (November 20, 1869 – June 15, 1959) was a French-American horse owner, artist, sculptor, war veteran and sportsman.

== Biography ==
Born to wine merchant Auguste La Montagne and Anne Davis La Montagne, daughter of Thomas E. Davis, Harry estimated he spent half of his life in France and the other half in the United States.

Educated at the Académie Julian in Paris, Harry was the brother-in-law of Nobel Peace Prize recipient Nicholas Murray Butler.

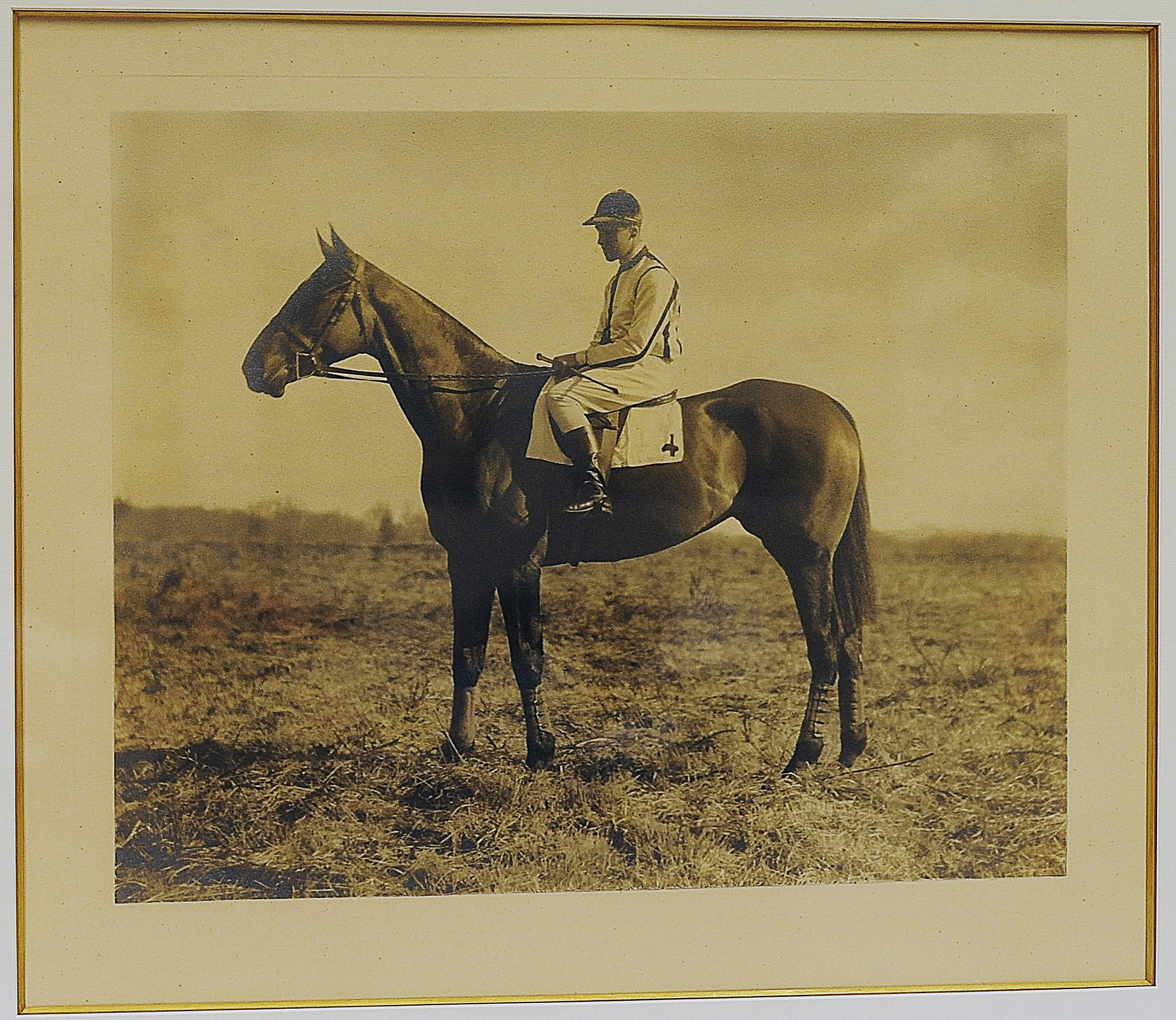
Goliath, owned by Harry La Montagne. Foaled 1919. Winner Pau Steeplechase 1924. Collection of the Cercle Anglais, Pau.

La Montagne married Emma Morgan, daughter of Thomas Morgan, in New London, Connecticut on March 2, 1871. She was reported as ill in 1898 and was listed on a joint passport application in 1899, but there is no trace of her when Harry La Montagne held the post of General Manager at the Golden Link Mining Company in Arizona in 1905.

In 1906, he was presumably a widower when he married Beatrice Kinney on April 30, 1906 at St. Patrick's Cathedral presided by Archbishop Farley. “Bea” was the daughter of Francis Sherwood Kinney and Mary Brady. He was one of the founders of Kinney Brothers Tobacco Company, which they merged with American Tobacco Company, the subject of one of the earliest antitrust cases before the Supreme Court requiring the break-up of the company in 1911. His brother, the second co-founder of the company was Abbot Kinney who is most famous for developing the beachfront neighborhood of Venice in Los Angeles.

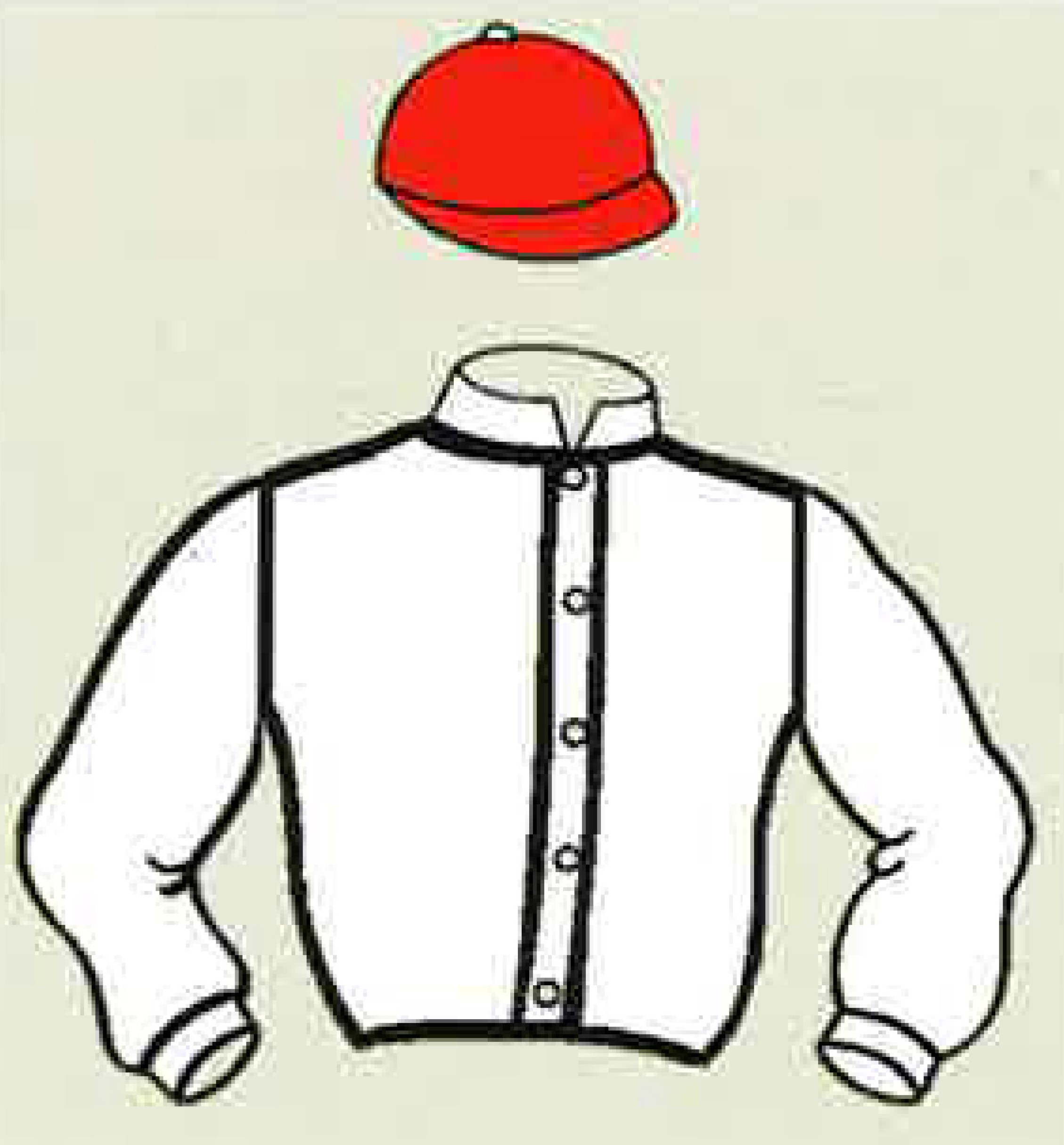
Racing Silks of Harry La Montagne.

In 1911 Harry moved his stables to France during the movement to abolish racetrack gambling. Shortly after the outbreak of World War I, Harry returned to the United States after his horses were confiscated by the French government for war service. After the couple’s return to the United States, they spent time between Narragansett, New York and Aiken, South Carolina, where the La Montagnes hunted with Frederick Henry Prince and John Harvey Wright Jr, present and past Masters of the Pau Hounds.

In 1917, La Montagne enlisted at the age of 47 and served in France attaining the rank of major and was the recipient of the French Légion of Honor on May 16, 1919.

Between 1920 and 1939, the La Montagnes spent each winter at Pau, France renting the Villa Regina, where Harry La Montagne first commissioned Sir Alfred Munnings to paint Beatrice La Montagne's portrait in 1921 and then his own. The La Montagnes were active in Pau’s Anglo-American colony, being members of the English Club, the Golf Club and the Société de Encouragement. They were also subscribers to the Pau Hunt.

Harry La Montagne was the owner of Conniver, namesake of the Conniver Stakes. Beatrice La Montagne died at their apartment in the Plaza Hotel on December 22, 1948. Harry died at the apartment on June 15, 1959.

== Works ==
Harry La Montagne was an amateur artist. The majority of his works were presented to family and friends as gifts. Harry painted with watercolors, gouache, ink and oil. He sculpted in terra cotta and bronze. The majority of his works are still in the possession of those families, several of which were members of the English Club at Pau. A recent donation of over 200 of his works was recently made by the family of Odette Dewavrin. This collection consists of two sketchbook albums and 82 postcard Pau Hunt Meet notices with watercolor, gouache and ink designs Harry La Montagne offered to Miss Dewavrin.

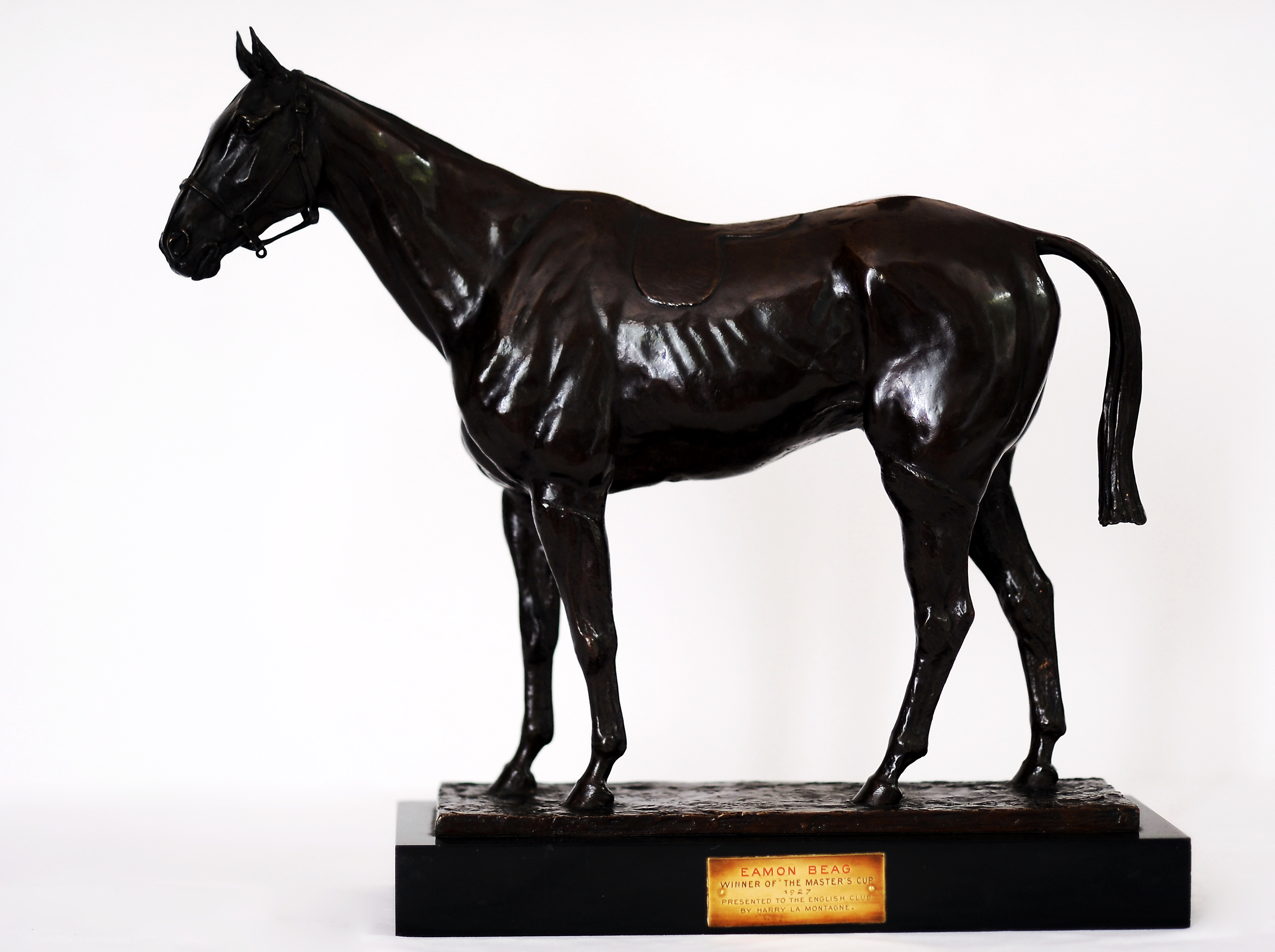
Harry La Montagne (1869-1959) Eamon_Beag Bronze Collection of the Cercle Anglais

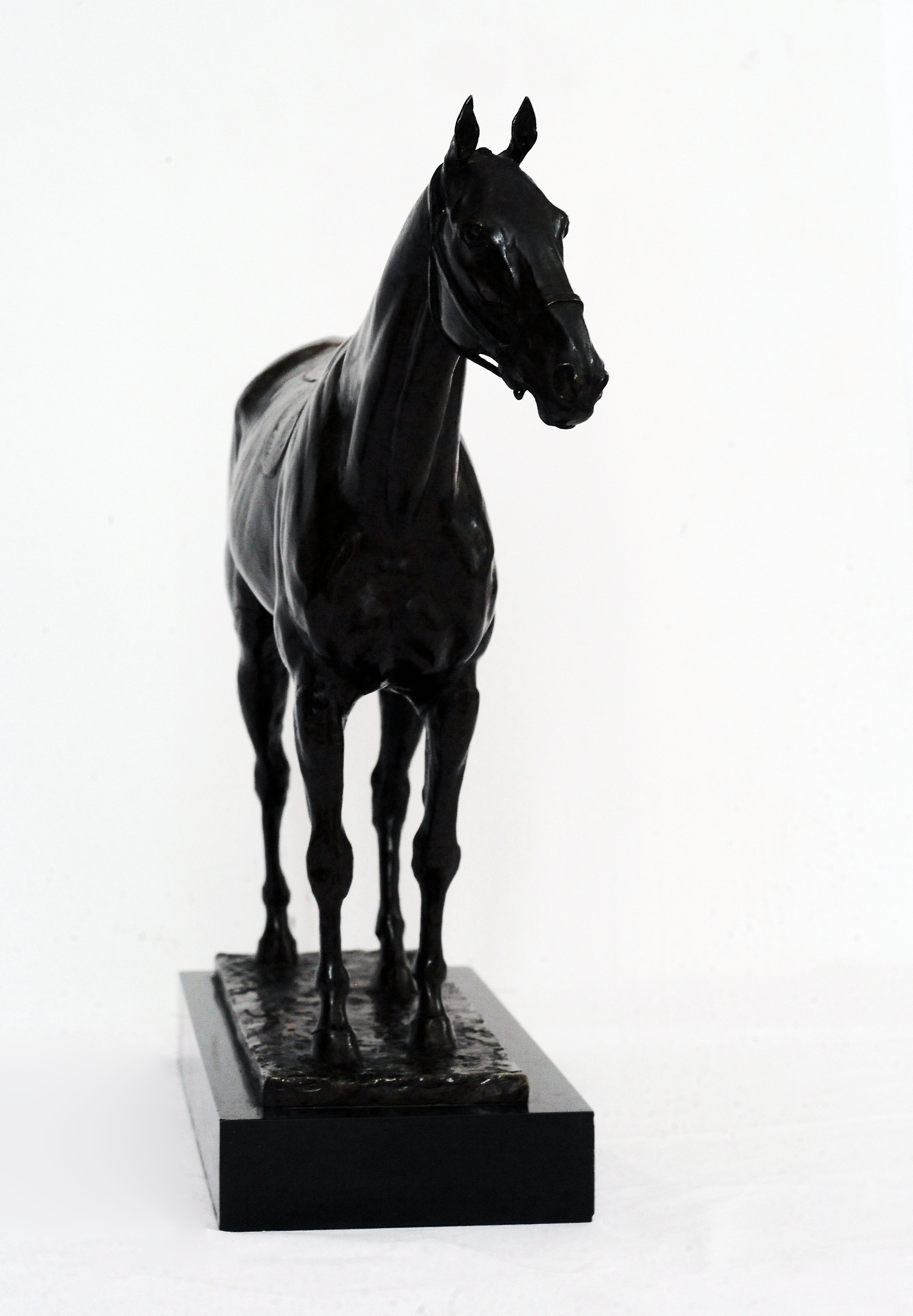
Harry La Montagne (1869-1959) Eamon_Beag Bronze Collection of the Cercle Anglais

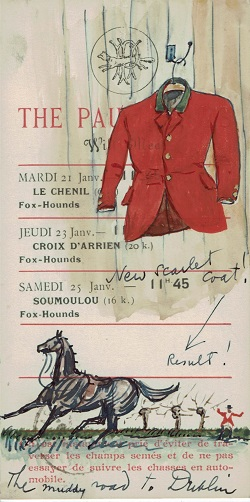
Harry La Montagne (1869-1959) 1936 Gouache and Ink Collection of the Cercle Anglais

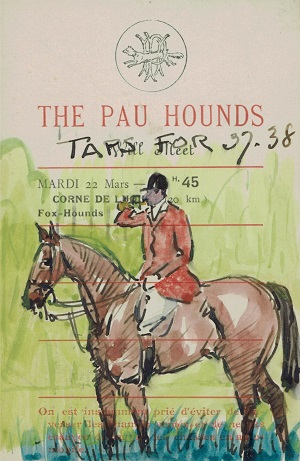
Harry La Montagne (1869-1959) 1938 Gouache and Ink Collection of the Cercle Anglais

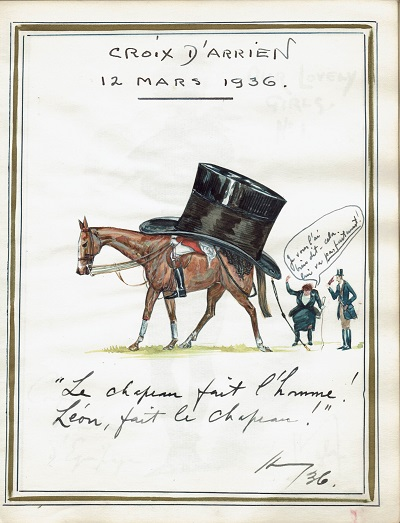
Harry La Montagne (1869-1959) 1936 Gouache and Ink Collection of the Cercle Anglais

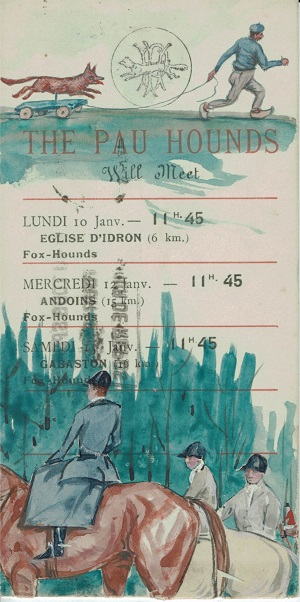
Harry La Montagne (1869-1959) 1938 Gouache and Ink Collection of the Cercle Anglais

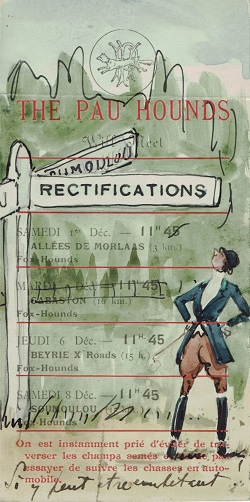
Harry La Montagne (1869-1959) 1934 Gouache and Ink Collection of the Cercle Anglais
