= William Knapp Thorn =

American polo player

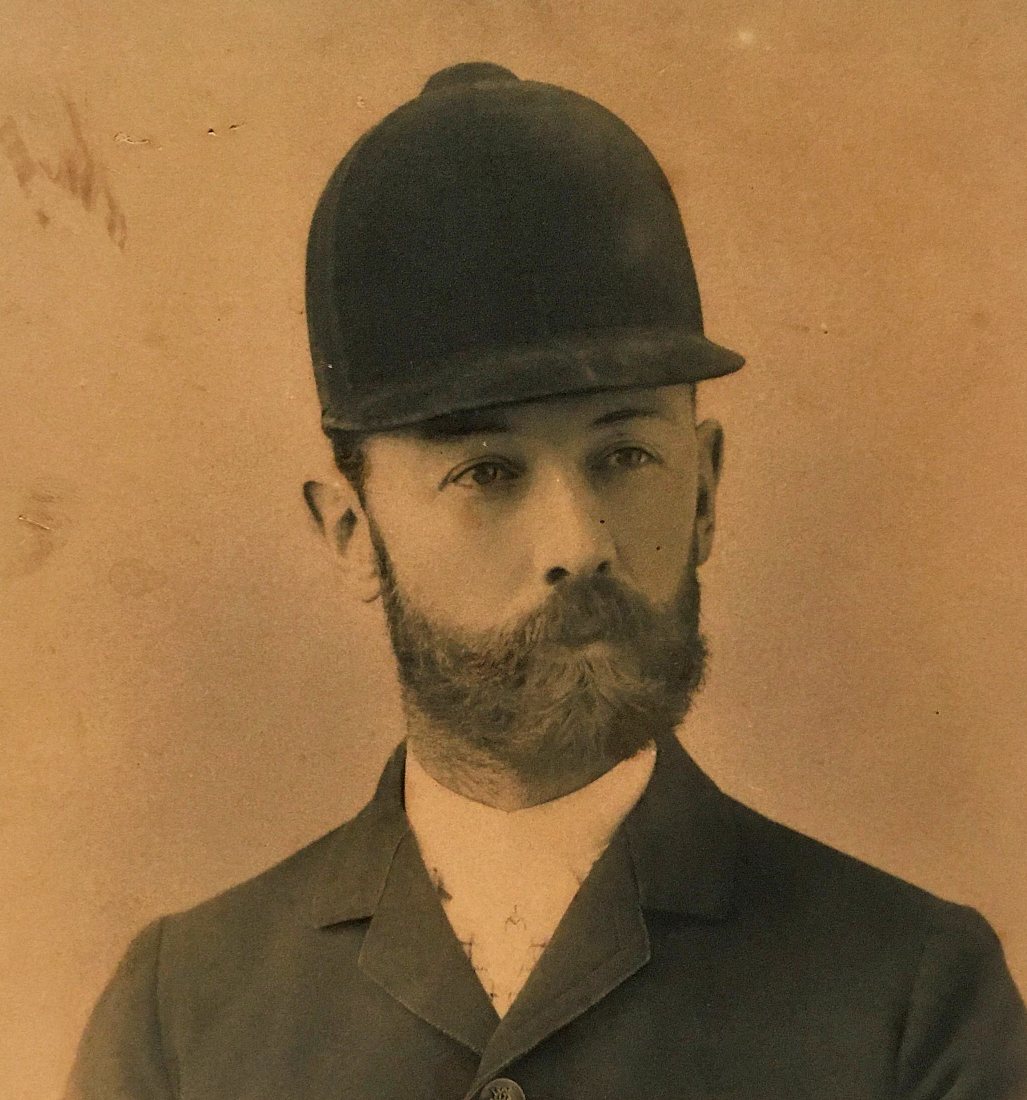
Master of the Pau Hounds, William Knapp Thorn Jr.

William Knapp Thorn, Jr. (April 10, 1848 – November 16, 1910) was an American champion polo player and the grandson of Commodore Cornelius Vanderbilt. Also, he was a hunter and horse-rider. He was one of the best-known sportsmen in the United States and France, master of the Pau Hounds and later chairman of the Pau Hunt kennel committee.

== Biography ==
He was born in 1848 to William Knapp Thorn and Emily Almira Vanderbilt Thorn. Thorn received his LLB from Columbia Law School in 1870.

Thorn participated in the 1886 International Polo Cup with teammates Foxhall Parker Keene and Thomas Hitchcock, Sr.

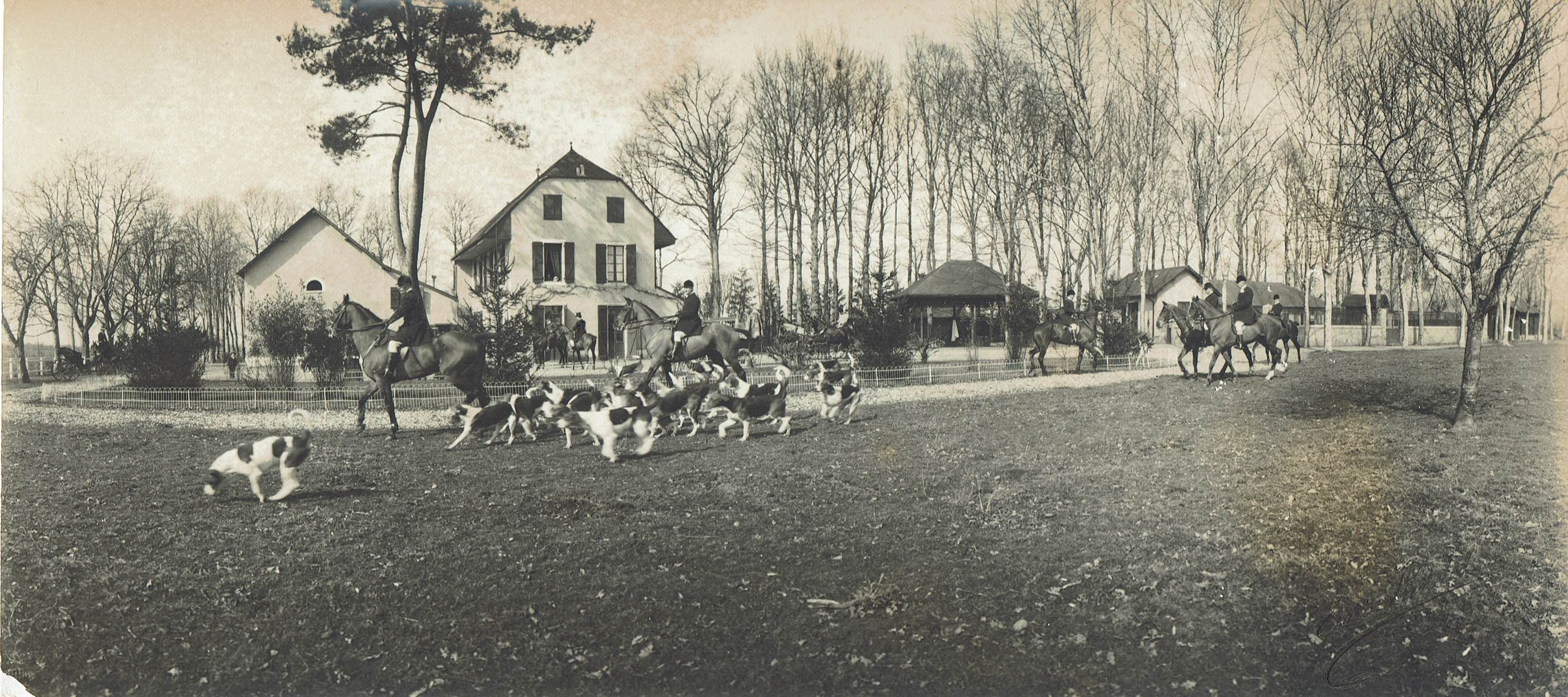
Marie Prévotat (1870-1923) Photograph c.1913 Today's Pau Hunt Kennels, donated to the town of Pau in memory Thorn's cousin Alfred Torrance (1852-1887). Both were grandsons of Cornelius Vanderbilt.

Thorn hunted at Pau, France along with his cousin Alfred Torrance, who had hunted there from 1882. Thorn made Pau his primary residence after the deaths of his sister, Emma Sophia Thorn King Parrish, his cousin Alfred Torrance and his father - all between February and May 1887. It was at Pau that he raised his sister's orphaned children; Louise Thorn King Baring, Emilie Thorn King Post and Herbert Thorn King. In memory of her son Alfred, Thorn's aunt, Sophia Johnson Vanderbilt Torrance donated the funds to purchase a farmhouse, where Thorn built the Pau Hunt kennels, stables and lodging for staff. Thorn paid for a phone line to be run between the kennels and the English Club - a distance of 8 miles (13 km). Thorn served on the committee of the Pau Hunt and was a member of the English Club. He was Master of the Pau Hounds from 1888-1890 and served as the Pau Hunt Committee Chairman from 1903 until his death.

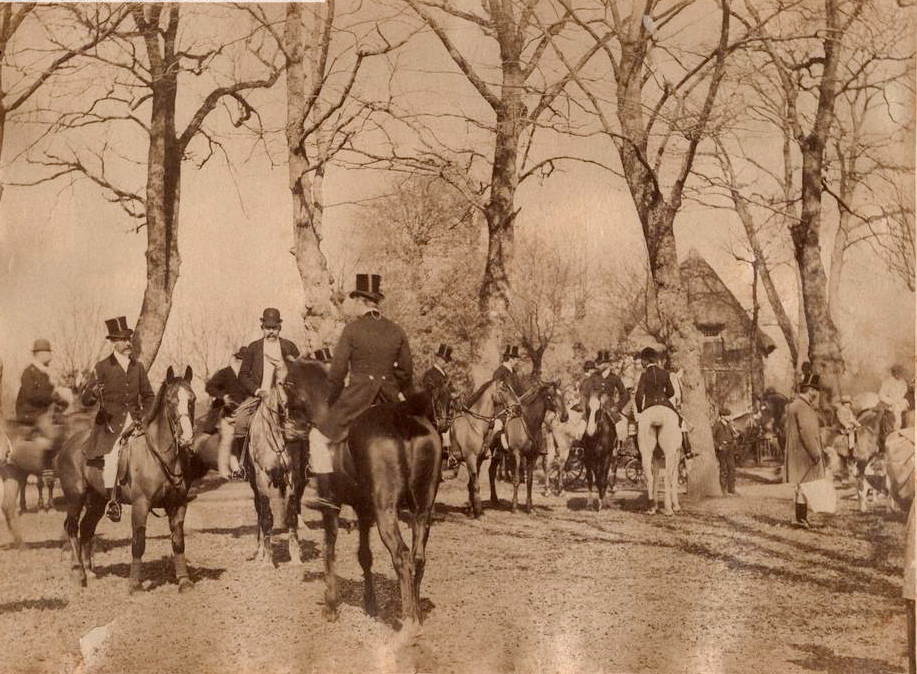
Pau-Hunt : Arsenius; Arthur Smyth, baron d'Este; Hubert, comte de Ganay; James Mellor; Prince de Poix; William Knapp Thorn, Edgard Lejeune, G. Brinquant

Thorn along with James Gordon Bennett, Jr., who had also served as master of the Pau Hunt, were founders of the defunct Pau Polo Club.

He contributed to the development of cars and motorsport in the region of Pau. He and Georges Nitot founded the Automobile-club of Bearn, which organized the first motor races in the southwest of France in 1899. This race became the famous Pau Grand Prix which is still popular today.

Thorn died in Pau on November 16, 1910 and was interred at Green-Wood Cemetery on January 9, 1911.
