= Entlebucher Mountain Dog =

Entlebucher Sennenhund, Entlebucher Mountain Dog
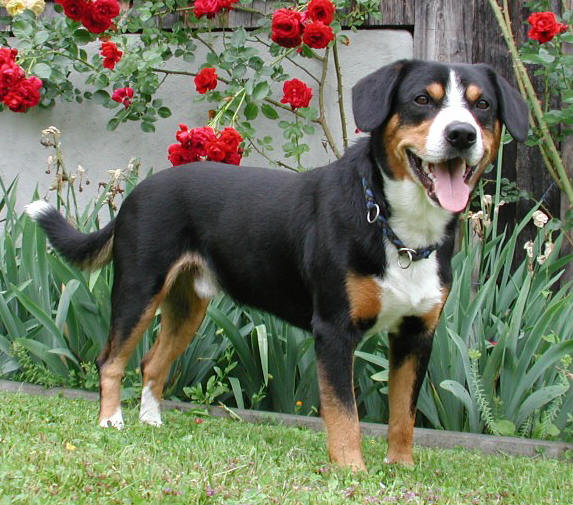
- Entlebucher Sennenhund
- Other names: Entelbuch Mountain Dog; Entelbucher Cattle Dog; Entlebucher; Bouvier de l'Entlebuch
- Origin: Switzerland
Kennel club standards
- Fédération Cynologique Internationale: standard

The Entlebucher Sennenhund or Entlebucher Mountain Dog is a medium-sized herding dog, it is the smallest of the four regional breeds that constitute the Sennenhund dog type. The name Sennenhund refers to people called Senn, herders in the Swiss Alps. Entlebuch is a region in the canton of Lucerne in Switzerland.

The breed is also known in English as the Entelbuch Mountain Dog, Entelbucher Cattle Dog, and similar combinations.

== History ==
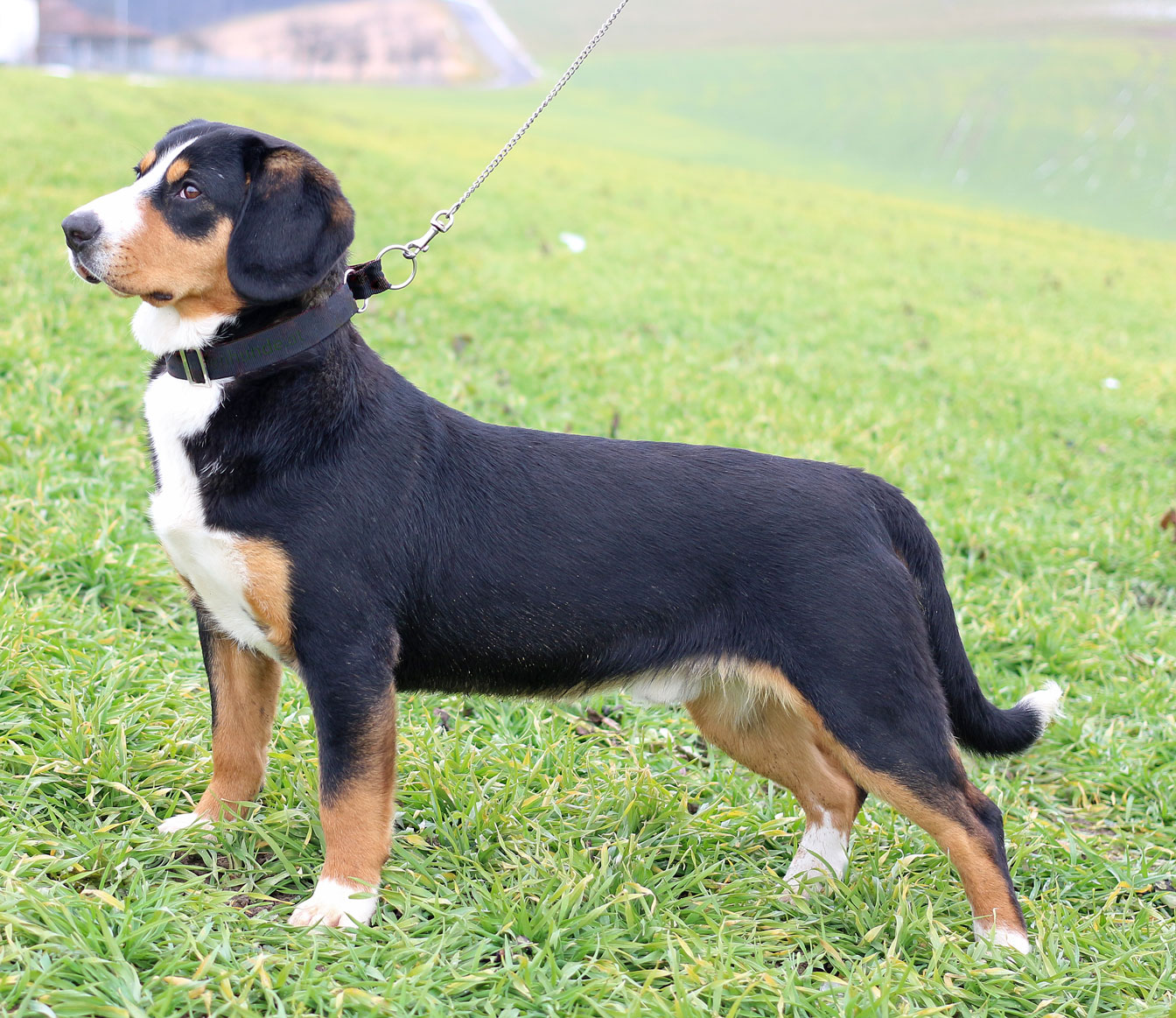
Entlebucher Sennenhund

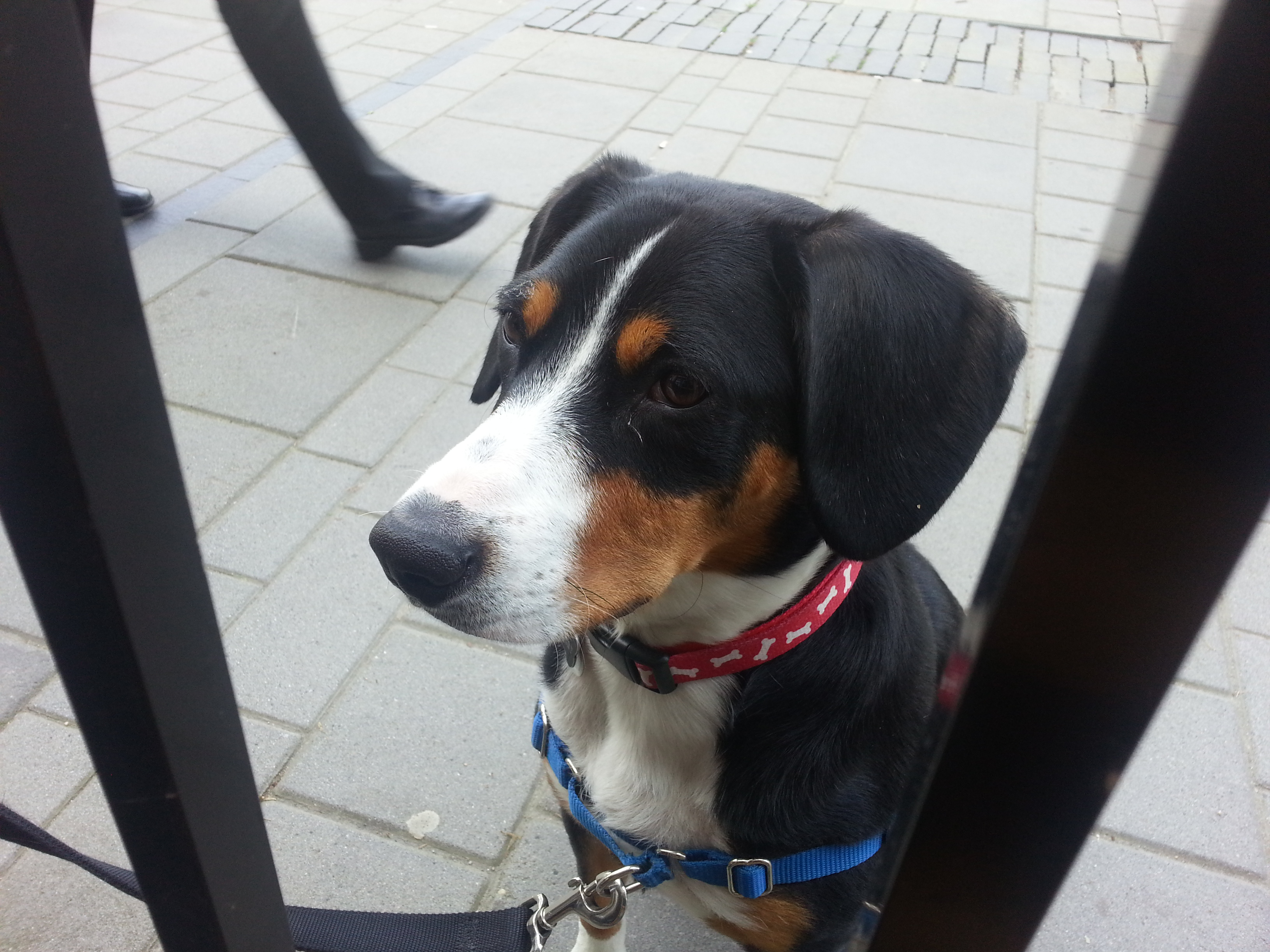
Entlebucher puppy at 11 months of age

The Entlebucher is the smallest of four Swiss mountain dogs, the others being the Appenzeller Sennenhund, the Bernese Mountain Dog, and the Greater Swiss Mountain Dog. During the 1800s these dogs were variable and were not regarded as distinct breeds. In 1908 the Swiss Kennel Club set about classifying them.

In 1913, four bobtail Entlebucher Sennenhund were shown to Albert Heim, an advocate for the increasingly rare Sennenhund breeds. The breed was entered into the Swiss Kennel Club stud book, but World War I intervened, and at first, after the war, no examples of the breed could be found.

The first breed club was not formed until 1926, 16 dogs of the type were found in 1927, and the breed slowly was restored. Although originally kept for guarding and herding, today the breed is usually kept as a lively companion.

=== Four breeds of Sennenhund ===
The four breeds of Sennenhund, with the original breed name followed by the most popular English version of the breed name, are:

- Grosser Schweizer Sennenhund, Greater Swiss Mountain Dog
- Berner Sennenhund, Bernese Mountain Dog
- Appenzeller Sennenhund, Appenzeller Mountain Dog
- Entlebucher Sennenhund, Entlebucher Mountain Dog

The Entlebucher breed shares many characteristics of other livestock guardian dogs from around the world.

== Appearance ==
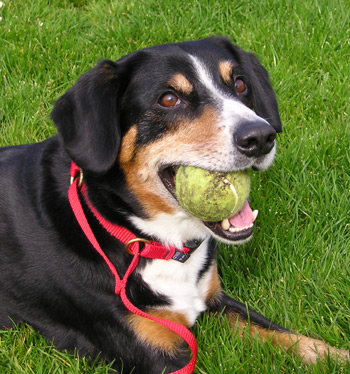
Entlebucher with a tennis ball

The female Entlebucher Sennenhund is a square; the male is a longer, less square, sturdy, medium-sized dog. It has small, triangular ears and rather small brown eyes. The head is well proportioned to the body, with a strong flat skull. The long jaw is well formed and powerful. The feet are compact, supporting its muscular body. The smooth coat is close and smooth with symmetrical markings of black, tan, and white. This tricolor coat has white on its toes, tail-tip, and the chest and blaze where the fur is soft and fluffy; the tan always lies between the black and the white. It has muscular, broad hips. The hocks are naturally well angled. The tail is sometimes docked, a practice which is now prohibited by law in many countries, or it may have a natural bobtail. Height at the withers is 19-20 ins (48–50 cm) and weight is 45-65 lbs (20–30 kg).

== Temperament ==
As with all large, active working dogs, this breed should be well socialized early in life with other dogs and people, and be provided with regular activity and training. Temperament of individual dogs may vary. The Standard says that the breed is "good-natured and devoted towards people familiar to him, slightly suspicious of strangers."

== Kennel club recognition ==
The Entlebucher Sennenhund is recognised internationally by the Fédération Cynologique Internationale, using the standard written in the breed's native Switzerland. Other national kennel clubs not affiliated with the Fédération Cynologique Internationale also recognise the breed, often writing their own versions of the breed standard.

The Entlebucher is recognised by The Kennel Club (UK) and the Canadian Kennel Club and placed in the Working Group. The United States Kennel Club (US) places the breed in the Herding Group. It is not yet recognised by the New Zealand Kennel Club or the Australian National Kennel Council. The breed is recognised by numerous small clubs and internet-based registries, where it is promoted as a rare breed for puppy buyers seeking a unique pet.

The breed was accepted into the American Kennel Club Stud Book on December 1, 2010 and became eligible to compete in the herding dog group on January 1, 2011.

== Health issues ==
Inbreeding due to the small foundation stock numbers has led to Entlebuchers suffering from congenital defects, the most common of which is hip dysplasia. Hemolytic anemia also is known to occur. Progressive Retinal Atrophy (PRA) is also present in the breed. The National Entlebucher Mountain Dog Association (NEMDA), in collaboration with other organizations, is working to eliminate these issues from the breed through responsible breeding, genetic testing, and fact dissemination.

== See also ==
- List of dog breeds
- Preservation breeding
