= Appenzeller Sennenhund =

Swiss breed of dog

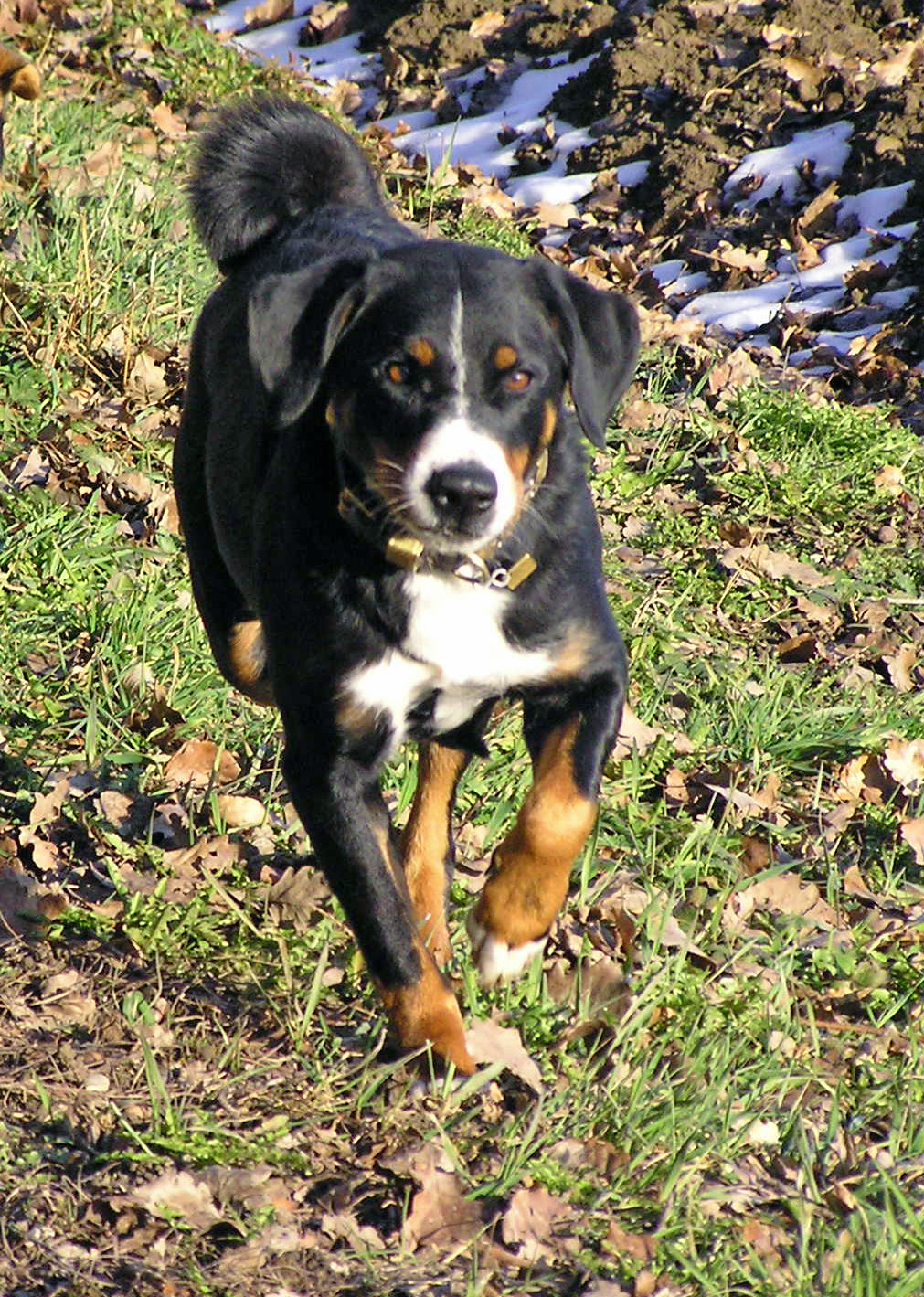
- Other names: Appizöller Bläss; Bouvier de l'Appenzell; Bouvier Appenzellois; Bovaro dell'Appenzell; Appenzell Cattle Dog
- Origin: Switzerland
Traits
| Height | Males | 52–56 cm (20–22 in) |
| | Females | 50–54 cm (20–21 in) |
- Weight: 22–32 kg (49–71 lb)
| | Males | 28 kg (62 lb) |
| | Females | 22 kg (49 lb) |
- Coat: double
- Colour: tricolour: black or Havana brown, with white and reddish-brown markings
Kennel club standards
- Fédération Cynologique Internationale: standard

The Appenzeller Sennenhund is a Swiss breed of medium-sized working dog. It originates in the Appenzell region of north-eastern Switzerland, and is one of four regional breeds of Sennenhund or Swiss mountain dog, all of which are characterised by a distinctive tricolour coat.

== History ==
The Appenzeller Sennenhund is the traditional working dog of the Sennen – Alpine cattle-herders and dairymen – of the Appenzell region of north-eastern Switzerland. The earliest written description of it is that of Friedrich von Tschudi in Das Thierleben der Alpenwelt, published in 1853. In the late nineteenth century Max Sieber, a forester who had seen the dogs at cattle shows in eastern Switzerland, asked the Schweizerische Kynologische Gesellschaft to recognise the breed; a commission was established with financing from the canton of St. Gallen and the Appenzeller Sennenhund was recognised in either 1896 or 1898. Eight of the dogs were shown at the international dog show in Winterthur in 1898; they were entered in a new Sennenhunde class.

In 1906 a breed society, the Appenzeller Sennenhunde Club, was established at the instigation of the cynologist Albert Heim, who in 1914 drew up the first full breed standard. The breed was definitively accepted by the Fédération Cynologique Internationale in 1954.

It has spread from Appenzell to other parts of Switzerland and to other European countries. A study published in 2004 found it to be the most-registered breed in the canton of Appenzell, with 259 out of a total of 1358 registrations in the canton, or about 19%; in the whole of Switzerland it accounted for 360 of a total of 33470, or about 1.1% of all dogs registered by the Schweizerische Kynologische Gesellschaft.

It is the only Swiss dog breed considered to be at risk by ProSpecieRara, which lists it as gefährdet, 'endangered'. Numbers are stable but the gene pool is narrow; the association is in collaboration with the breed society, the Schweizerischer Club für Appenzeller Sennenhunde, to broaden it. It is listed by the Canadian Kennel Club among the herding dogs, and is included in the Foundation Stock Service of the American Kennel Club.

== Characteristics ==
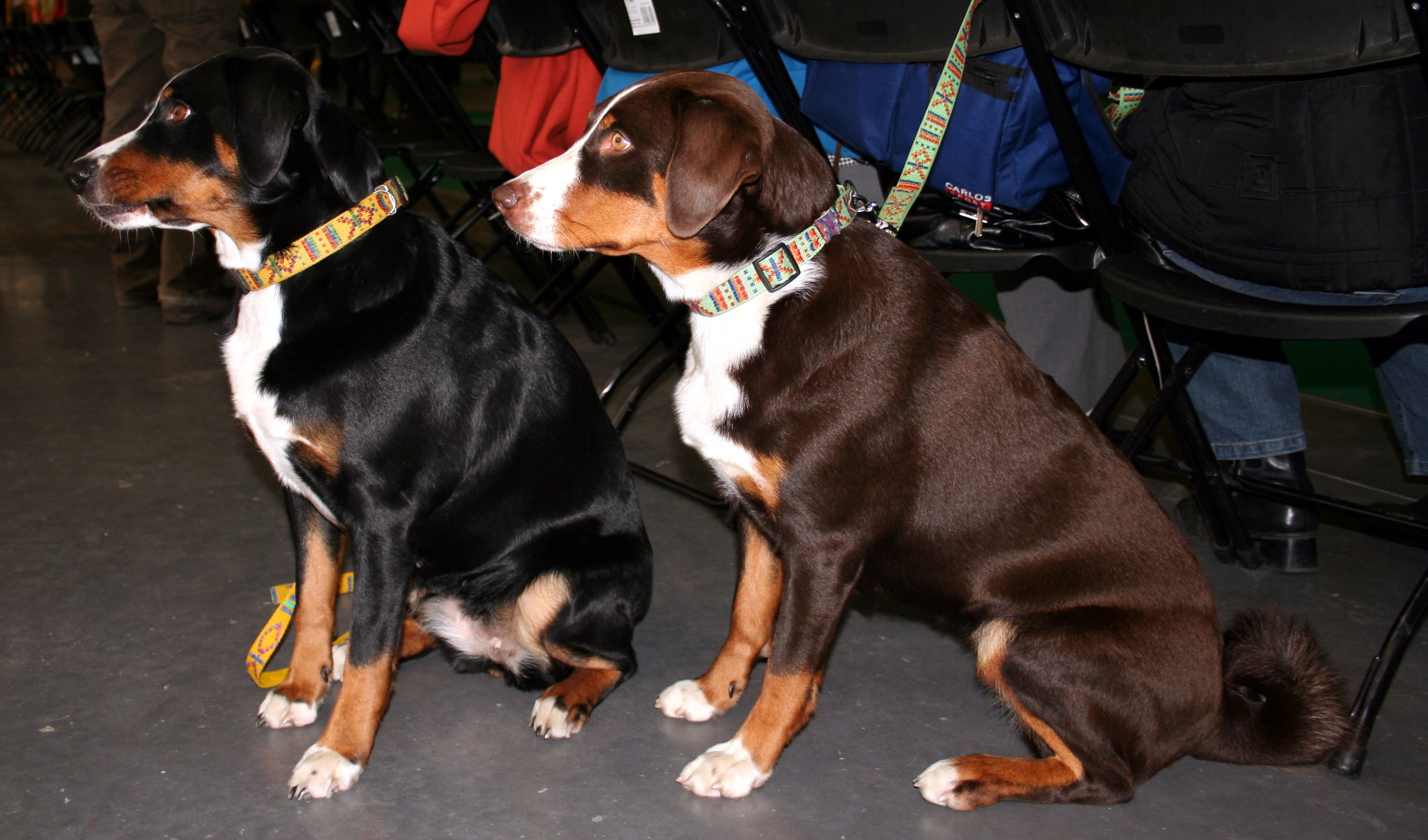
The two coat colourations, black and Havana brown

The Appenzeller Sennenhund is the third-largest of the Sennenhund or Swiss mountain dog group, which also includes the Grosser Schweizer Sennenhund, the Berner Sennenhund or Bernese Mountain Dog, and the Entlebucher Sennenhund. It is a medium-sized dog: dogs stand some 52–56 cm at the withers, bitches about 2 cm less; weights are in the range 22–32 kg.

The coat is double, the top-coat thick, straight and glossy. It is always tricoloured: the principal colour may be either black or Havana brown, with white markings to the chest, face and feet, and reddish-brown areas between those and the base colour.

The tail is set high and is carried in a tight curl over the back when the animal is moving. The ears are set high and are triangular and fairly small; they hang close to the cheeks when the animal is at rest, and are raised and turned forward when it is alert. Among the faults that disqualify a dog from registration are a wall eye, a kinked tail, a single coat and a coat that is not three-coloured. Dogs may be expected to live for some 12–14 years.

According to the breed standard, the Appenzeller Sennenhund is lively, high-spirited, athletic and suspicious of strangers.

== Use ==
The Appenzeller Sennenhund was traditionally used by the Alpine cattle-herders and dairymen of the Appenzell region both to herd cattle and to guard property. It is often kept as a companion dog.
