= Swiss mountain dog =

Type of dog

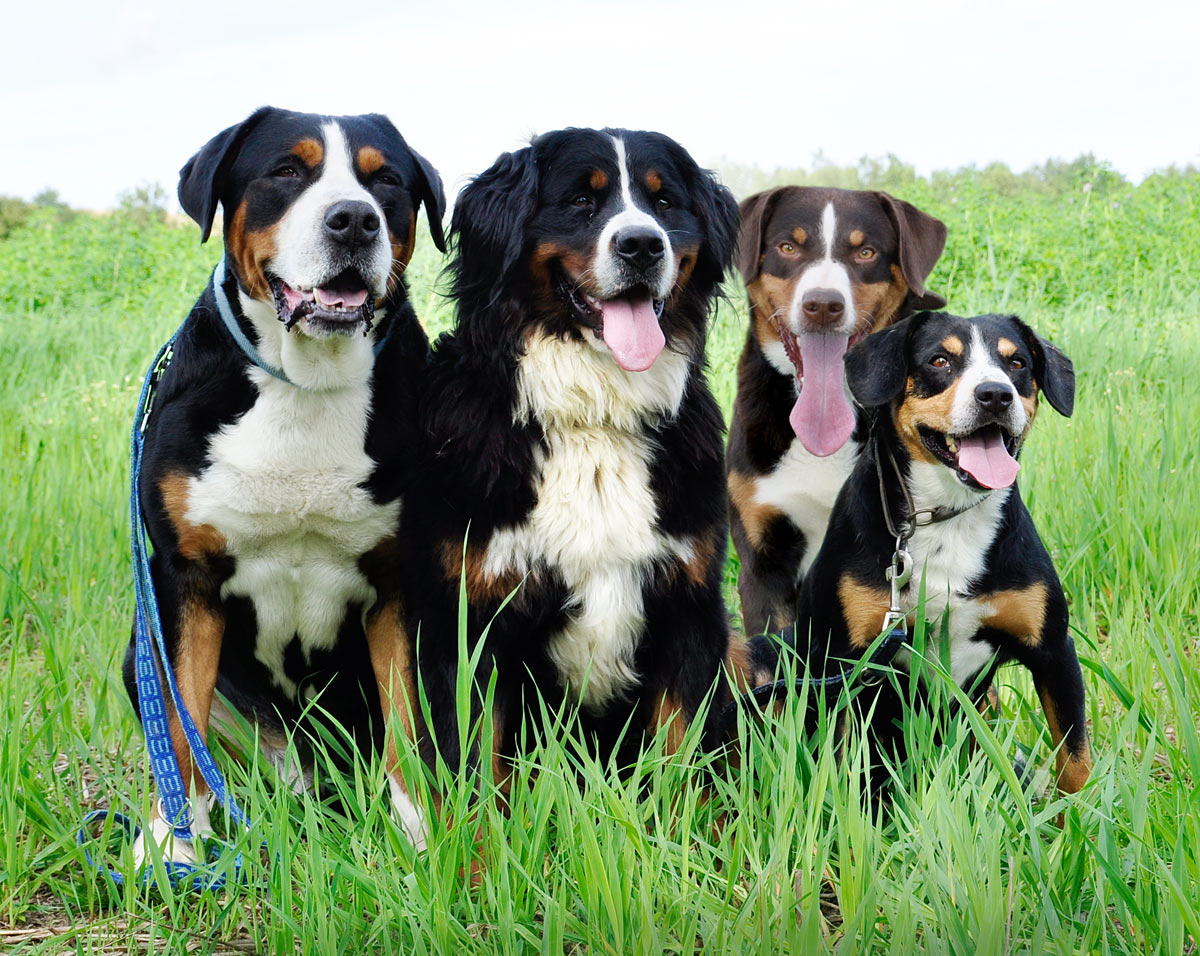
Representatives of the four Swiss mountain dog breeds

Sennenhunds, called Swiss mountain dogs or Swiss cattle dogs in English, are a type of dog originating in the Swiss Alps. The Sennenhund are farm dogs of the general livestock guardian type. There are four breeds of Sennenhunds, all sporting a unique tricolor coat. While the two larger ones share a heavy build and a calm temperament, the two smaller ones are more agile. The breeds range from medium in size to very large. The name Sennenhund refers to people called Senn or Senner, Swiss Alpine herdsmen and dairymen, and does not translate as "mountain" or "cattle".

== Breeds ==
This table shows the relative sizes of the four breeds, with the original breed name followed by the most popular English version of the breed name.

Breed	Height at withers	Weight
Grosser Schweizer Sennenhund (Greater Swiss Mountain Dog)	23½–28½ in (60–72 cm)	80–140 lb (36–64 kg)
Berner Sennenhund (Bernese Mountain Dog)	23–27½ in (58–70 cm)	65–120 lb (29½–54½ kg)
Appenzeller Sennenhund (Appenzeller Mountain Dog)	18½–23 in (47–58 cm)	49–70 lb (22–32 kg)
Entlebucher Sennenhund (Entlebucher Mountain Dog)	19–20 in (48–50 cm)	45–65 lb (20½–30 kg)

The four Sennenhund breeds are well known in Switzerland and the rest of Europe. In the United States, the Bernese Mountain Dog has become somewhat popular, while the other three breeds are promoted as rare to those seeking unique pets.

== History ==
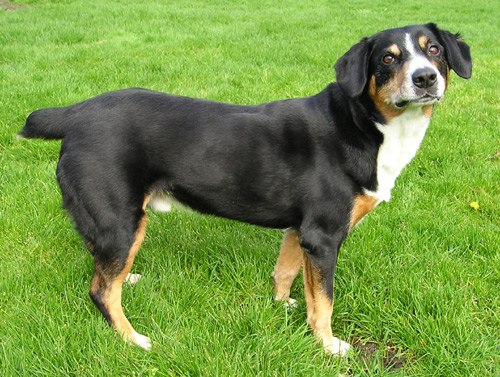
An Entlebucher Sennenhund (Entlebucher Mountain Dog), one of the Sennenhund (“Swiss mountain dog”) breeds, showing the type's heavy build and distinctive coloration

Although one writer believes that the Swiss mountain dog type derives from Roman molossus, the area from which the type originated never had Roman roads or towns. The word Senn or Senner is the term for Alpine herdsmen and dairymen (an Alpine meadow is called a Sennelager) who tend other farmers' cattle and sometimes sheep; Sennenhund means "dog of the Senn". Sennenhunds were not just cattle dogs, but were kept as general farm dogs, working as livestock guardian dogs and as herding dogs when necessary, as well as guarding the farmers' families, homes, herds and flocks. The guarding function was especially necessary in earlier times, when wolves and other large predators threatened livestock and people. The two larger Sennenhunds were also used for pulling carts. Today, with the reintroduction of wolves, research is being done on the use of these dogs to protect livestock.

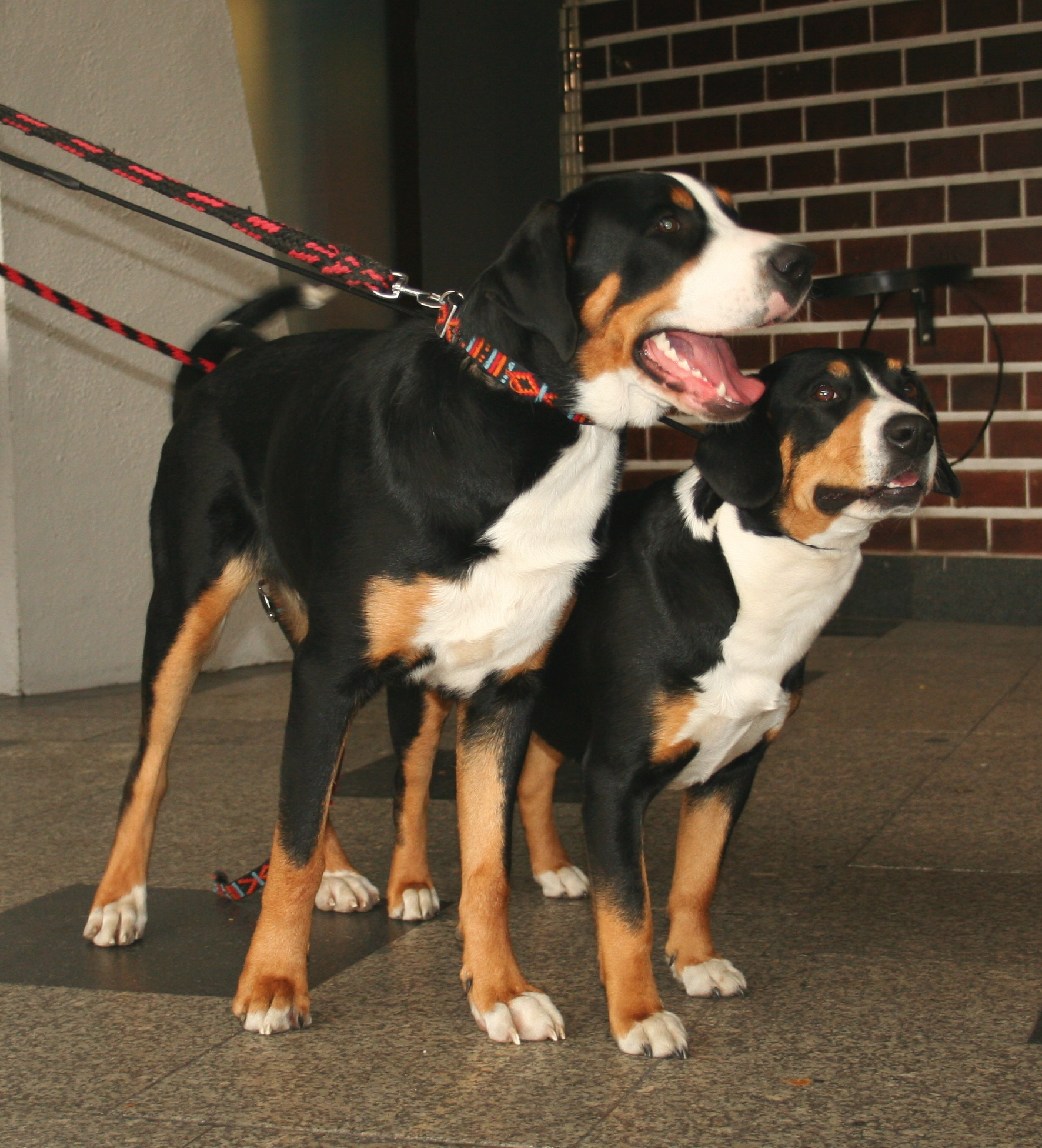
A Grosser Schweizer Sennenhund (left) and an Entlebucher Sennenhund (right)

A red and white color once found in the Sennenhunds was said to be from crosses with the St. Bernard, a breed from the Alps also said to be descended from Roman the molossus.

The Sennenhunds, especially the two larger breeds, began to disappear in the 1800s with the decline in need for butcher's dogs and carting dogs. The efforts of Alpine geologist and indigenous Swiss dog breeds advocate Albert Heim (1849-1937) brought various examples of Sennenhunds to an International Dog Show in 1908. At that point, Heim and other members of the Schweizerische Kynologische Gesellschaft (Swiss Kennel Club) began sorting out the dogs by what they judged to be representative breed types and naming the four breeds.

== Similar breeds ==
The St. Bernard was one of the first dog breeds to be documented and differentiated from other large farm dogs of the area. Except for color and historical documentation, the St. Bernard is very similar to the two larger Sennenhunds. Official documents from the hospice in St. Bernard Pass concerning the dogs date back to 1707, with paintings and drawings of the dog dating even earlier. The breed was the very first breed entered into the Swiss Stud Book in 1884 and the breed standard was finally approved in 1887.

The Rottweiler shares similarities in its location of origin, use and history.

== Tri-color coat ==
A tri-color coat is a pattern of some shade of black or brown, few shades of red that is often called tan, and some white. Some have tan markings above the eyes. Eumelanin and phaeomelanin pigmentation occurs on the same dog; "the back is black from eumelanin pigment being made and the belly is tan or red from phaeomelanin pigment being made".

== Breed examples ==
Examples of the four Sennenhunds, showing the similarity of the breeds and the characteristic tri-color coat.

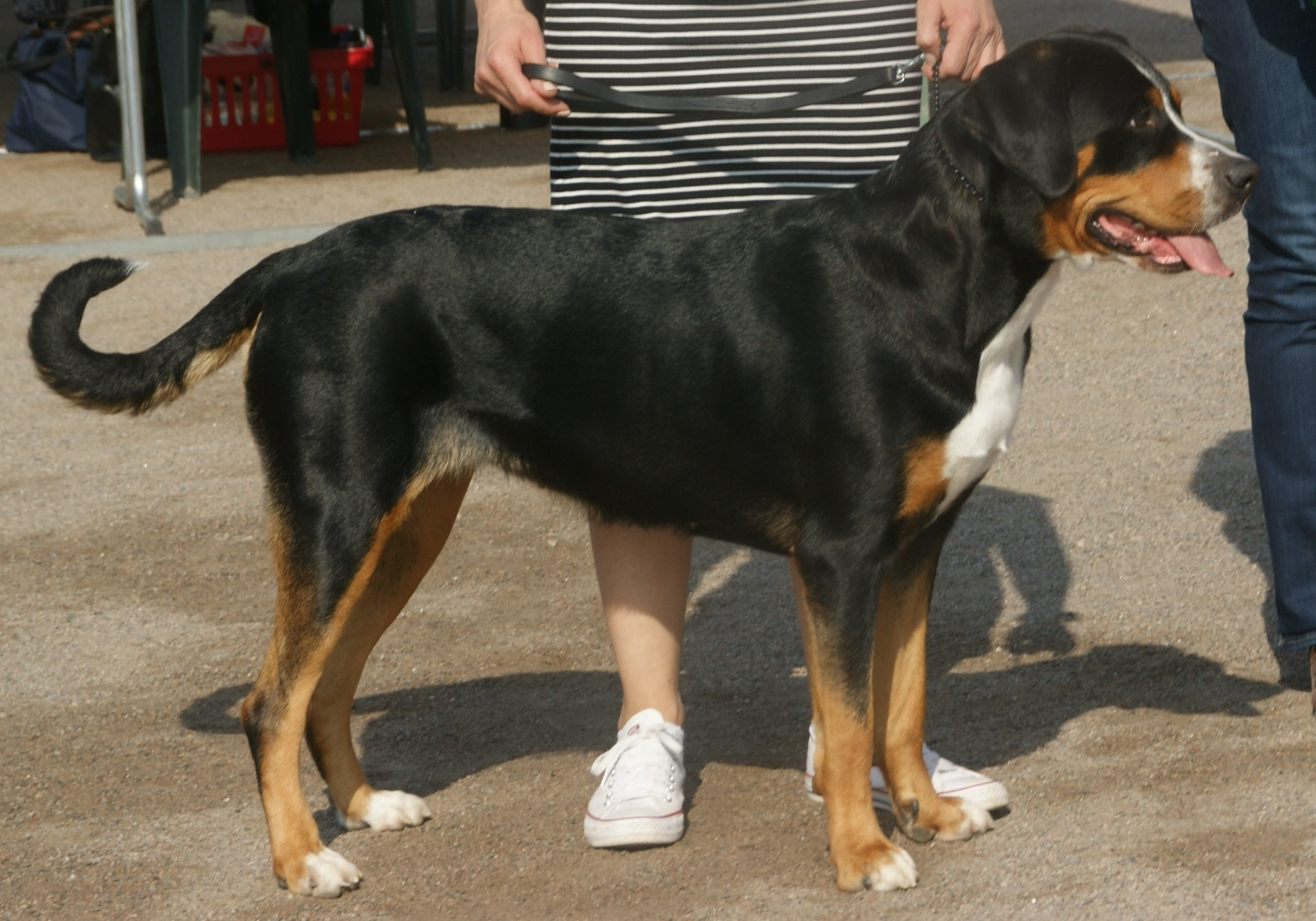
Grosser Schweizer Sennenhund (Greater Swiss Mountain Dog)

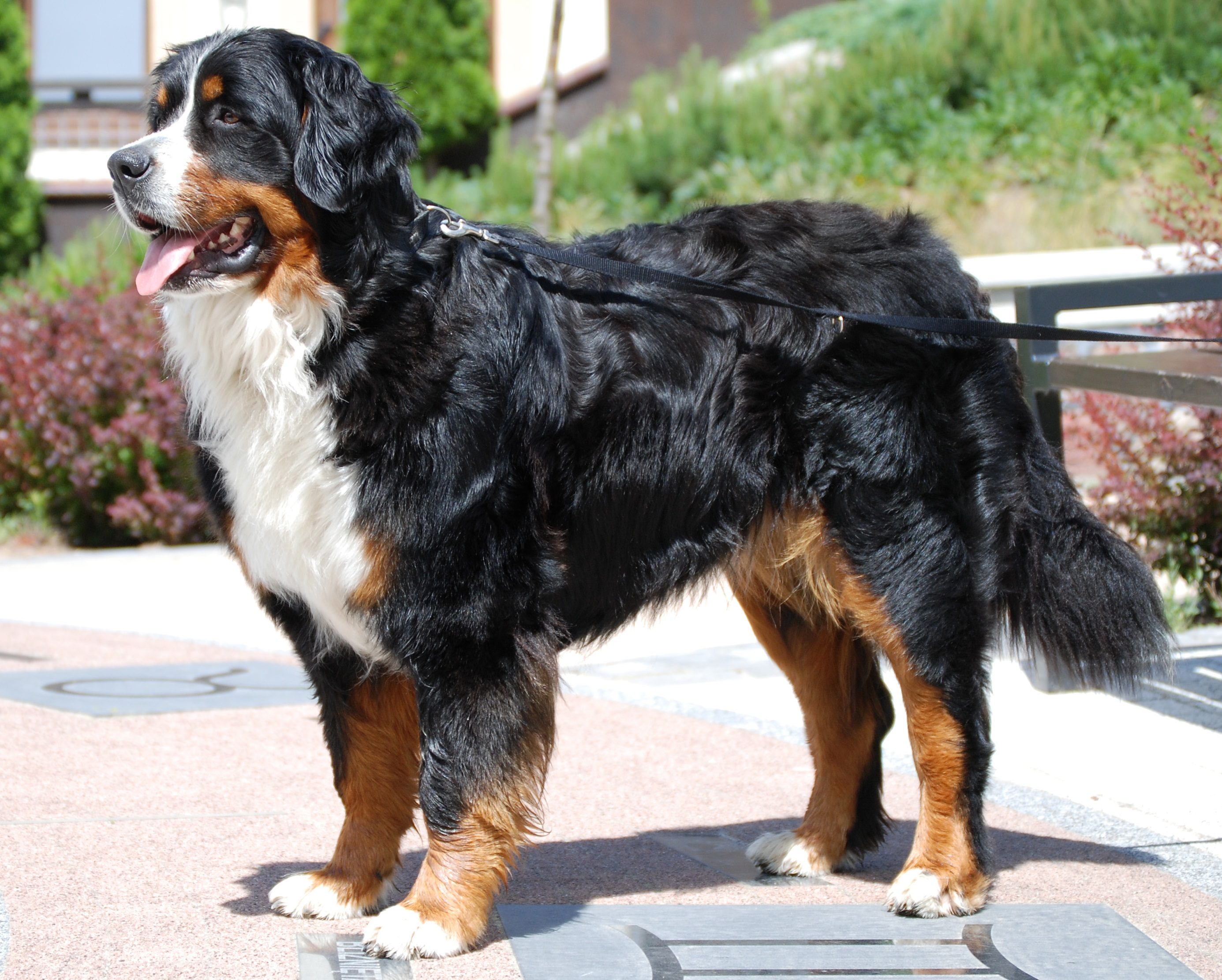
Berner Sennenhund (Bernese Mountain Dog)

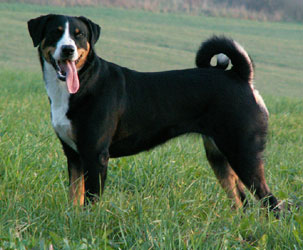
Appenzeller Sennenhund (Appenzeller Mountain Dog)

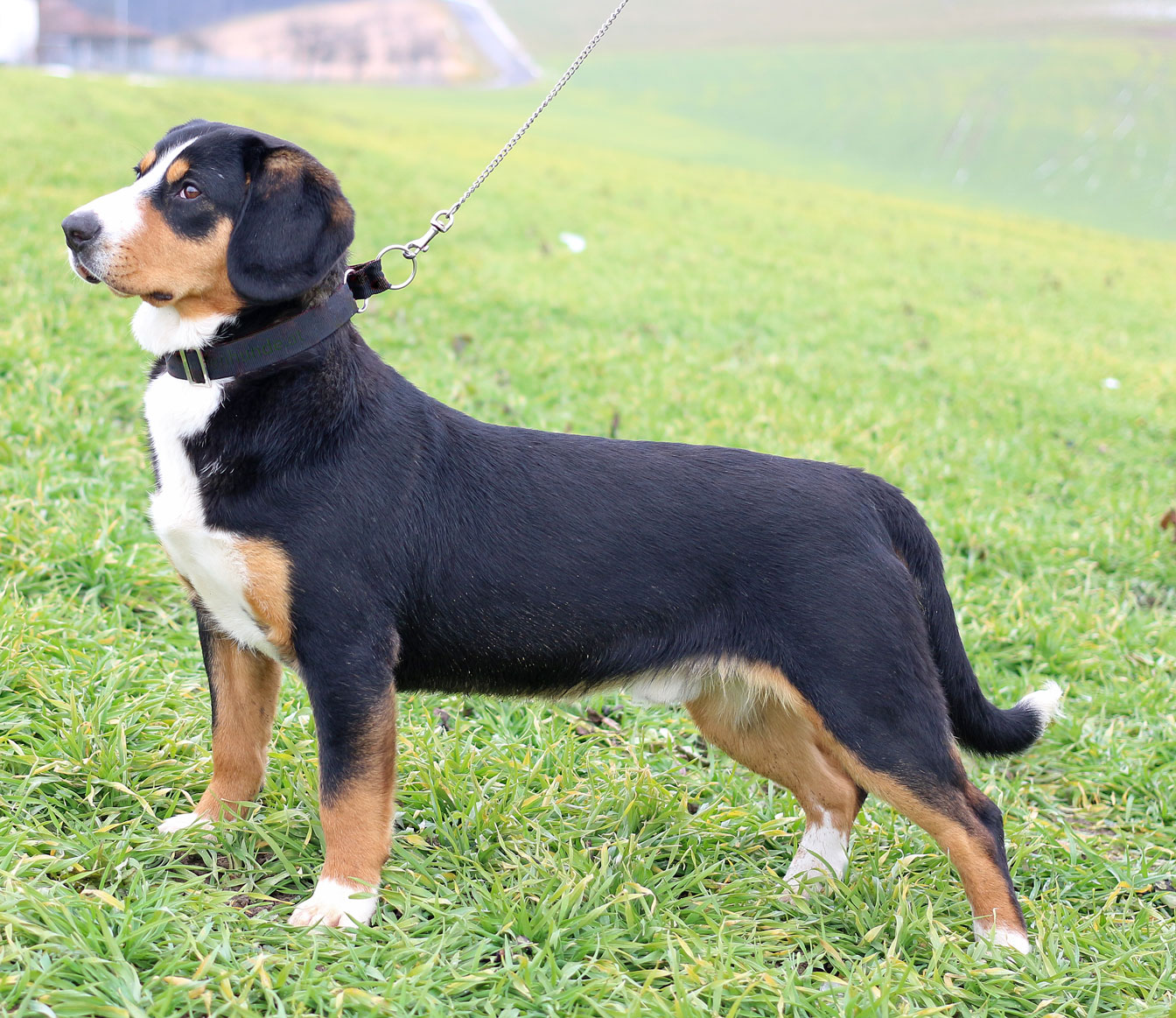
Entlebucher Sennenhund (Entlebucher Mountain Dog)

== See also ==
- List of dog breeds
- Transhumance in the Alps
- Pastoralism
