= GSMD =

GSMD may refer to:

- Greater Swiss Mountain Dog
- Guildhall School of Music and Drama, an independent music and dramatic arts school, founded in 1880 in London, England
- General Society of Mayflower Descendants or the Mayflower Society, a hereditary organization of individuals who have documented their descent from one or more of the 102 passengers who arrived on the Mayflower in 1620 at what is now Plymouth, Massachusetts
- Greater Sharpstown Management District, in Houston, Texas
- Greater Southeast Management District, in Houston, Texas
- gsmd, GSM daemon by Openmoko
