= Greater Swiss Mountain Dog =

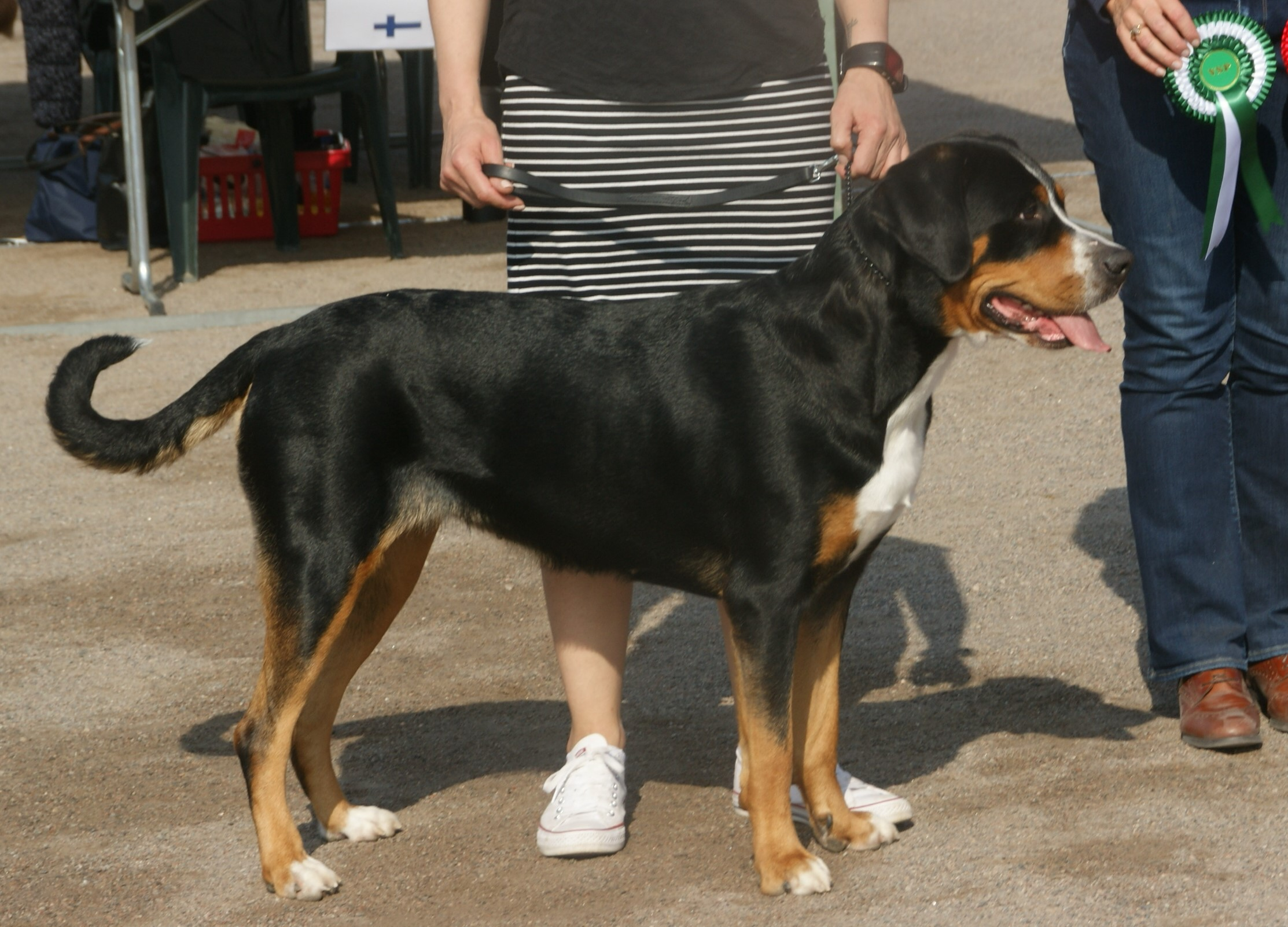
- Origin: Switzerland
Traits
Height	Males	25.5–28.5 in (65–72 cm)
	Females	23.5–27 in (60–69 cm)
Weight	Males	90–140 lb (41–64 kg)
	Females	80–110 lb (36–50 kg)
- Coat: short, double coat
- Color: tricolor (black, rust or tan, and white)
- Litter size: up to 18
Kennel club standards
- Fédération Cynologique Internationale: standard

The Greater Swiss Mountain Dog (German: Grosser Schweizer Sennenhund or French: Grand Bouvier Suisse) is a dog breed which was developed in the Swiss Alps. The name Sennenhund refers to people called Senn or Senner, dairymen and herders in the Swiss Alps. Greater Swiss Mountain Dogs are almost certainly the result of indigenous dogs mating with large mastiff-type dogs brought to Switzerland by foreign settlers. It was assumed to have almost died out by the late 19th century, since its work was being done by other breeds or machines, but was rediscovered in the early 1900s.

Its breed standard calls for a black, white, and rust colored coat.

Among the four Sennenhunde, or Swiss mountain dogs, this breed is considered the oldest, and is also the largest.

== History ==
=== Breed history ===
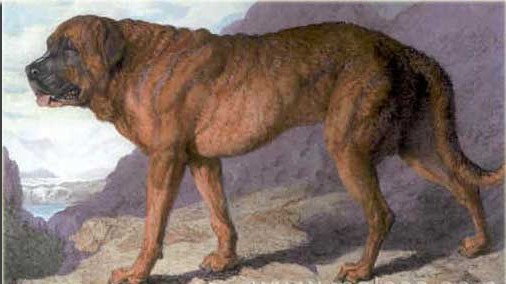
A painting of an Alpine Mastiff which was brought to Britain in 1815

The origin of the Greater Swiss Mountain Dog is not known. Beginning in 1515, the remote valleys of Switzerland were more or less isolated from world history for three centuries. Specific dog breeds were created by inbreeding, and puppies were given to neighbors and family members.

=== Selective breeding ===
The Greater Swiss Mountain Dog is a draft and drover breed that performs well very mountainous regions. Its popularity as a draft dog led to the nickname "the poor man's horse".

=== Renewal of breed ===
==== Prevailing theory ====
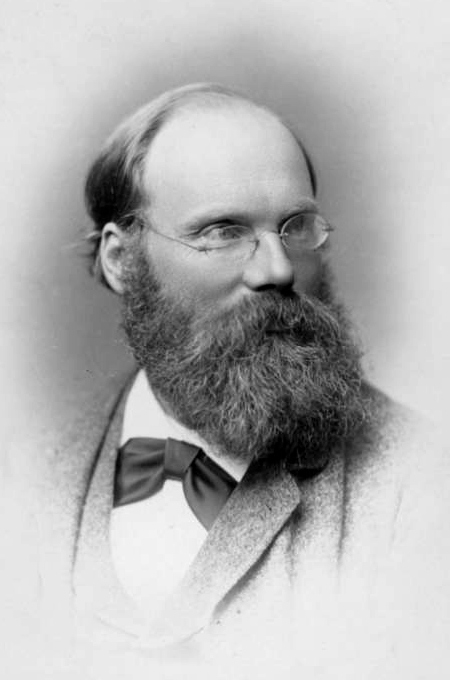
Professor Albert Heim

It was assumed that the Greater Swiss Mountain Dog had almost died out by the late 19th century, because their work was being done by other breeds or machines, but they were rediscovered in the early 1900s.

In 1908, two short-haired Bernese Mountain Dogs were shown by Franz Schertenlieb to an advocate of the Swiss mountain dog, geology professor Albert Heim.

Heim was a Sennenhund expert, and started to encourage breeders to take an interest in them. These efforts resulted in the re-establishment of the breed. The first breed club was formed in 1912 to promote the Greater Swiss Mountain Dog. The Bernese Mountain Dog and the Greater Swiss Mountain Dog are two of four distinctive farm-type dogs of Swiss origin who were saved from extinction and revitalized by Schertenlieb in the late 1800s.

==== Secondary theory ====
Dr. Hans Raber commented on this discrepancy in his book, Die Schweizer Hunderassen:

If this dog was commonly kept around 1870, it is unbelievable that only 30 years later you could only find him in remote valleys in the Bern area.

— Dr. Hans Raber, Die Schweizer Hunderassen

Although Heim has said that the big butcher dogs, Metzgerhund, became extinct after foreign imports became more popular, there is speculation over whether farmers would get an expensive foreign dog. In 1889 an International Dog Show was held in Winterthur, northern Switzerland; various Sennenhunde were exhibited.

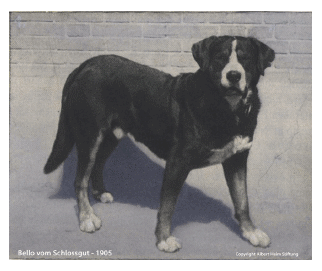
Bello v Schlossgut, SSB 3965, first shown in 1908.

=== 20th-century development ===
In 1945 over 100 puppies were registered, indicating the existence of about 350–400 dogs of the breed at that time.

The breed was first recognised internationally in 1939, when the Swiss Standard was first published by the Fédération Cynologique Internationale. In 1968 the breed was imported into the U.S.

There are a number of Greater Swiss that have been noted in the media. Network, owned by Sun Microsystems CEO, Scott McNealy, served as their mascot. Mouse, a Greater Swiss Mountain Dog living in Austin, TX served as the mascot of Keep Austin Dog Friendly. Oscar the Grouch, a Greater Swiss Mountain Dog, was featured in the front page of The Wall Street Journal as he prepared to compete at the Westminster Dog Show. According to the AKC, Greater Swiss Mountain Dogs are 88th in popularity as a breed.

== Appearance ==
=== Coat ===
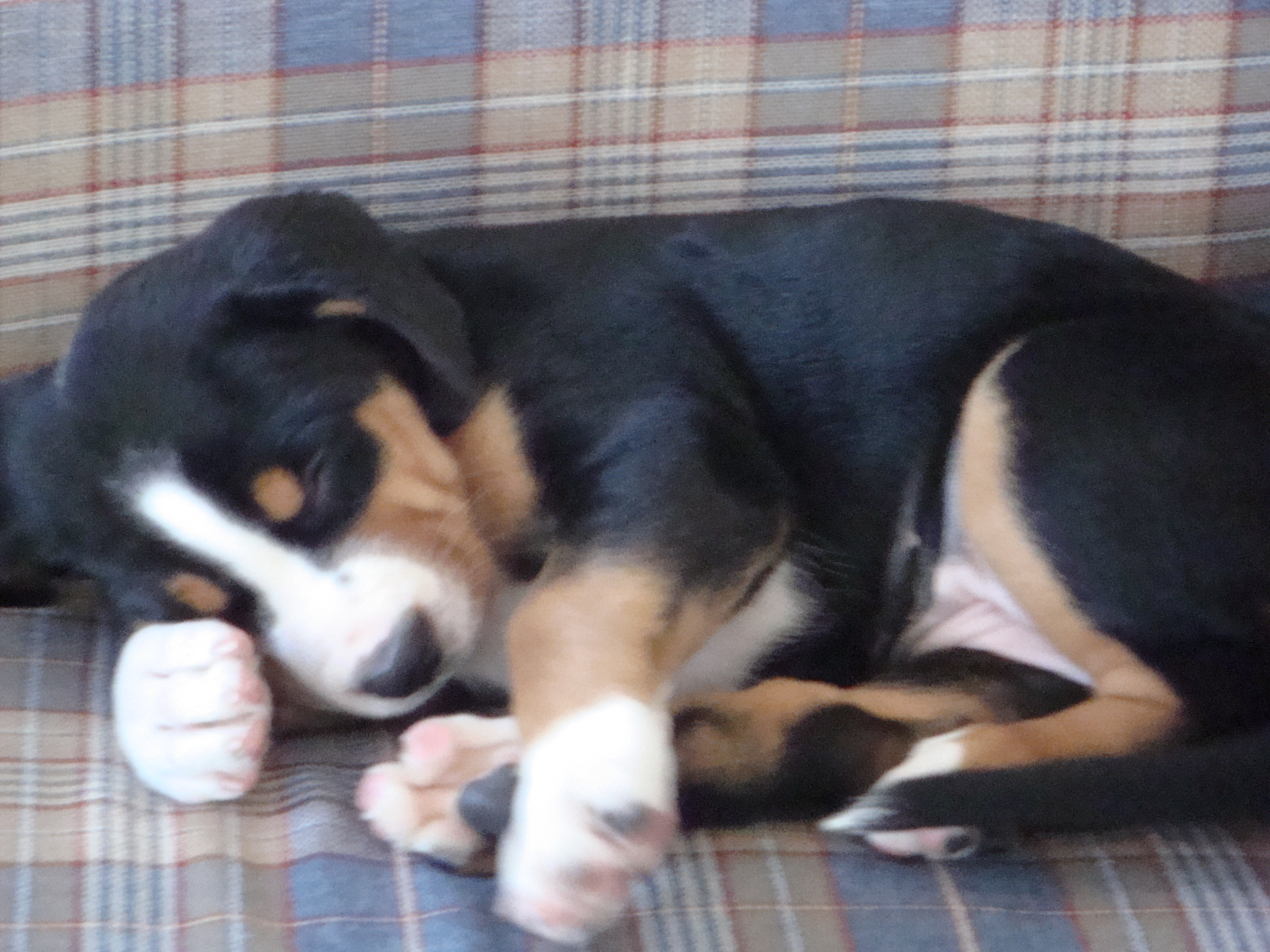
The coloration on a puppy

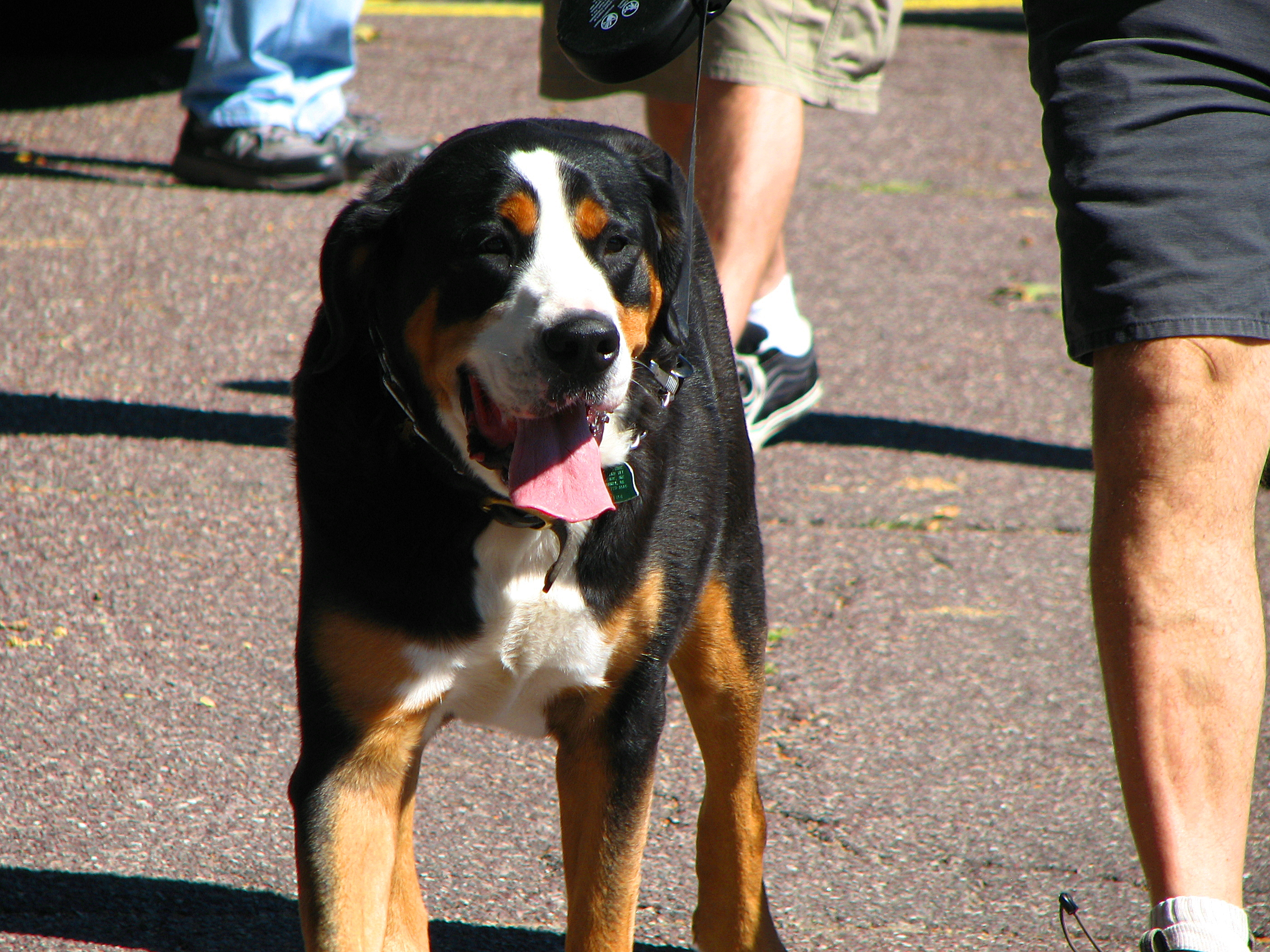
Desired coloration

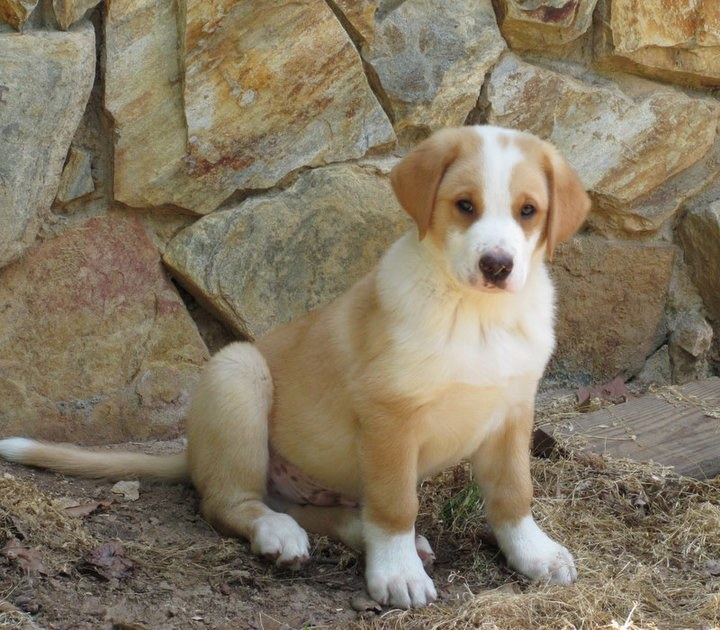
Red Greater Swiss Mountain Dog

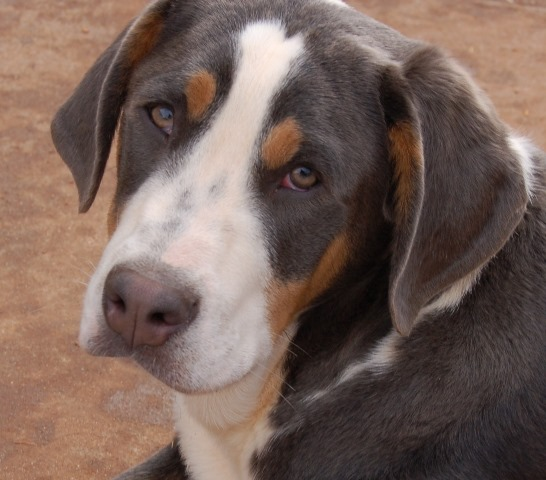
Blue Greater Swiss Mountain Dog

There is black on top of the dog's back, ears, tail and the majority of the legs. There should be rust on the cheeks, a thumb print above the eyes, and also rust should appear on the legs between the white and black. There should be white on the muzzle, the feet, the tip of the tail, on the chest, and up from the muzzle to pass between the eyes. Symmetry in markings and coloring are not a priority in the American Kennel Club standard for the breed. Function and temperament are prioritized as the dog must work. It is common to hear the phrase "the head doesn't pull the cart" or "markings don't pull the cart" to mean that cosmetic features are not highly valued.

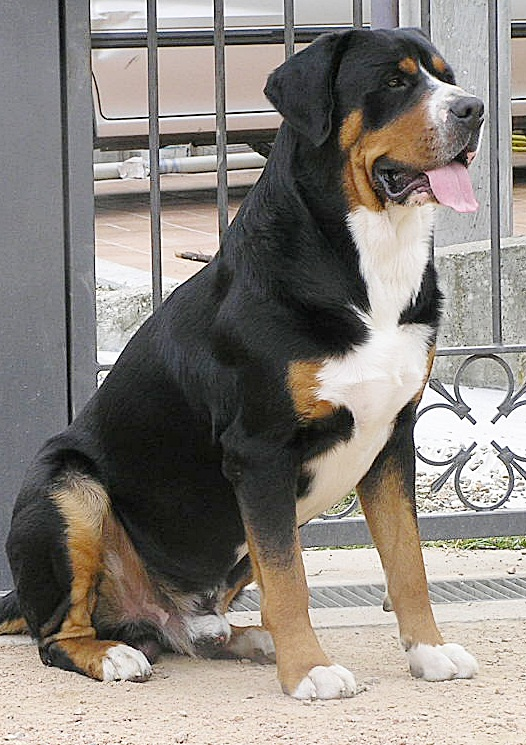
Greater Swiss Mountain Dog

The double coat has a dense outer coat of about 1.25 to 2 in (3.2 to 5.1 cm) long. Textures of the topcoat can range from short, straight and fine to longer, wavier and coarser. The under coat is thick and ranges from the preferred dark gray to light gray to tawny, and must be on the neck, but can be all over the body – with such a thick coat, Sennenhunde shed throughout the year and they have a major shedding once or twice a year.

While the Greater Swiss Mountain Dog Standard calls for a black, white and rust dog; they do come in other colors which include blue, white and tan tri-color; and rust and white bi-color. On the blue tri-color dogs, blue replaces where black would be and tan replaces where the rust would normally be. On the rust bi-color dogs, the dog is solid rust and white markings with a total absence of black coloring.

=== Size ===
Males range between 25.5 and 28.5 in (65 and 72 cm) at the shoulder and females range between 23.5 and 27 in (60 and 69 cm) at the shoulder. There is no standard for weight in the Greater Swiss Mountain Dog; males tend to range between 90 and 140 lb (41 and 64 kg) and females range between 80 and 110 lb (36 and 50 kg). Body length to height is approximately a 10 to 9 proportion; they are slightly longer than tall.

=== Conformation ===
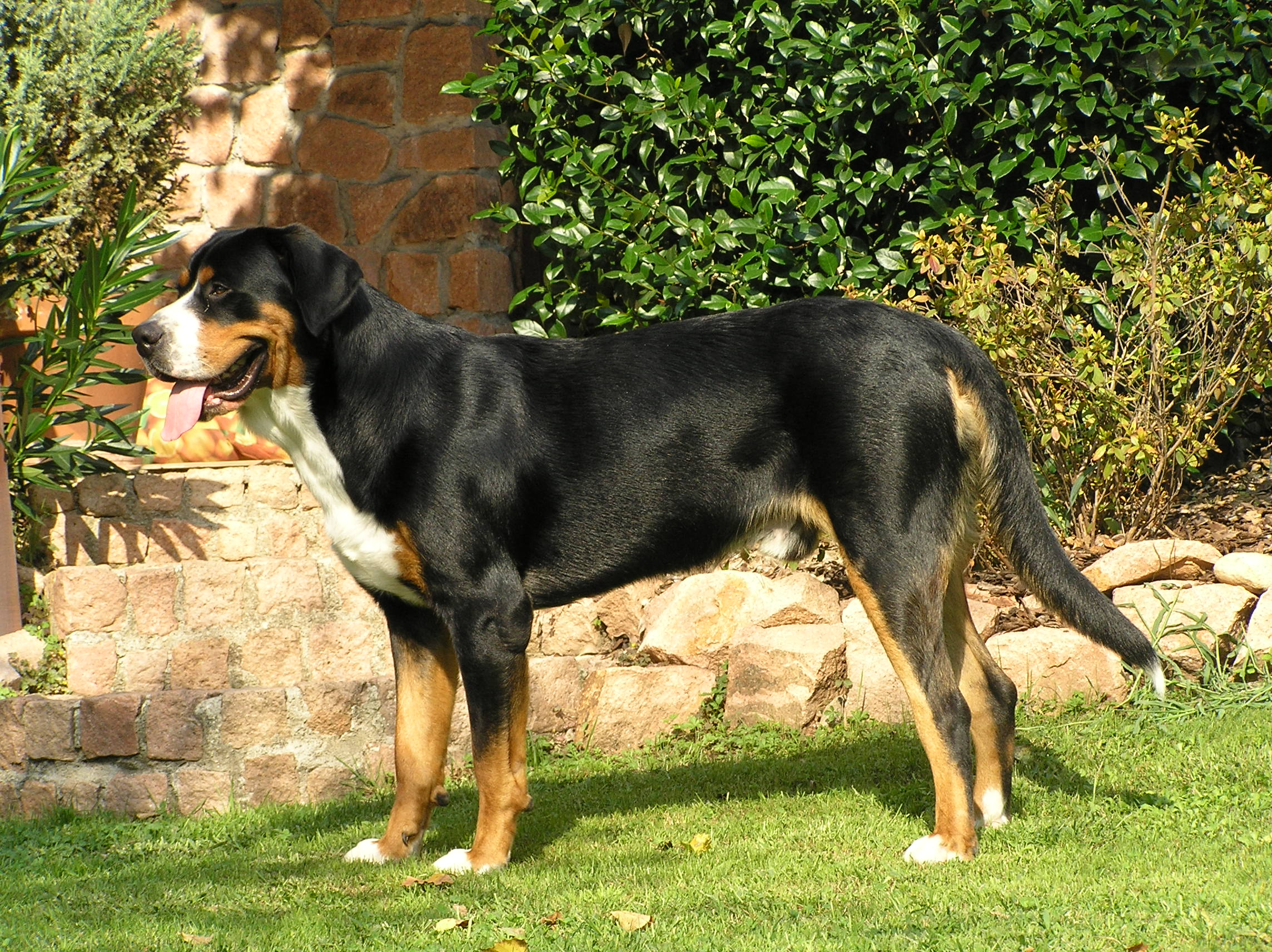
This Greater Swiss Mountain Dog has a fine, straight coat, a properly hanging tail and the desired level back. This dog lacks rear angulation, which is a serious fault for a working dog.

==== Head ====
Their eyes are almond-shaped, vary in color from hazel to chestnut – dark brown is preferred – medium-sized, and neither deep-set nor protruding.

==== Neck, topline and body ====
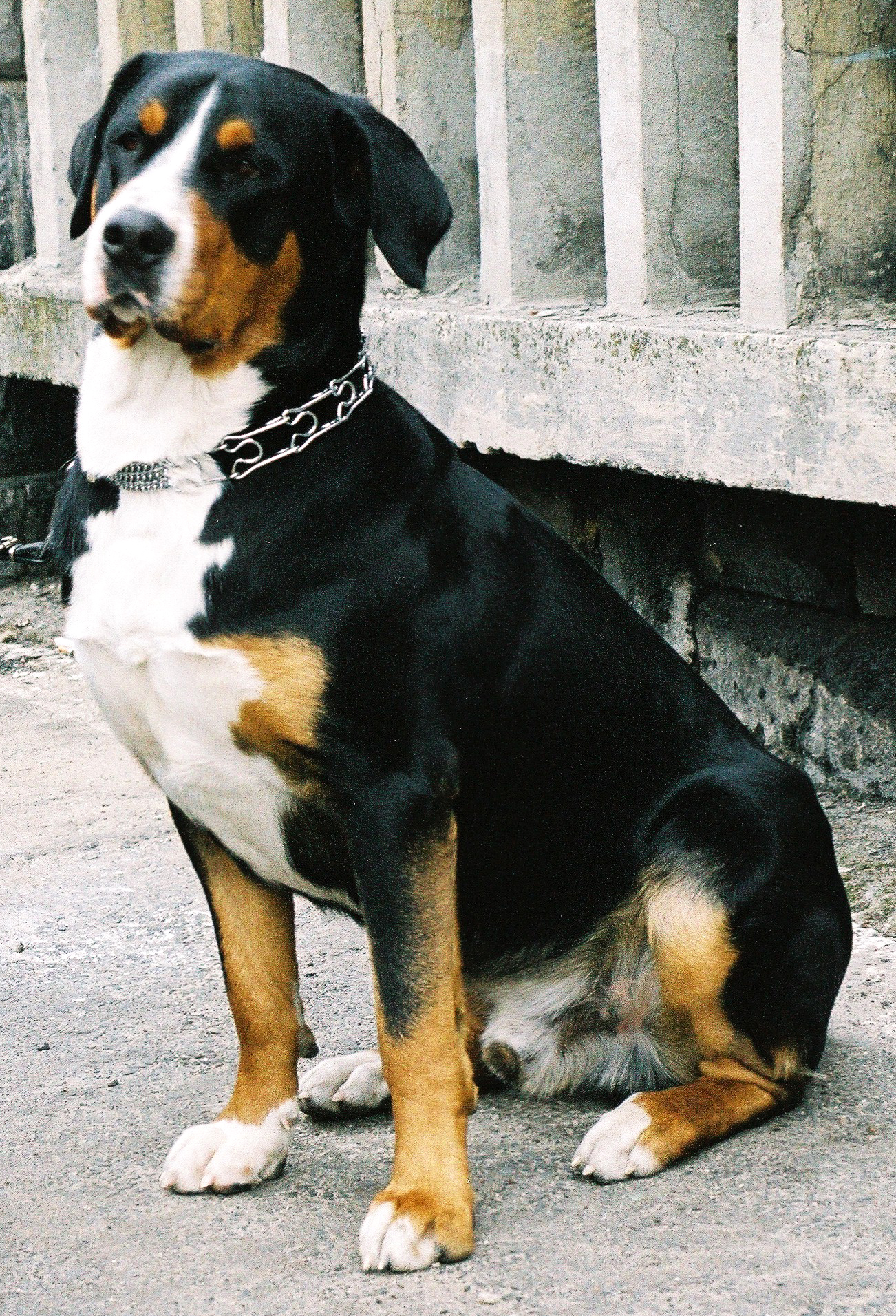
This Greater Swiss Mountain Dog has strong, well-muscled shoulders; straight, strong forelegs; slightly sloping pasterns and well-rounded feet.

the croup is the fused sacral vertebrae that form the roof of the pelvis and the first few vertebrae of the tail.

The depth of the chest is approximately one-half the height of the dog at the withers, and the deepest point of the chest should lie between the elbows, not above them.

==== Forequarters ====
The shoulders of a Greater Swiss Mountain Dog are long, sloping, strong, moderately laid back, flat and well-muscled.

==== Hindquarters ====
broad, strong and muscular hindquarters, and proper angles between the stifles and hocks are essential for a draft dog to provide powerful rear-drive during movement. The breed standard 'bend of stifle' refers to where the upper and the lower thighs meet. The hock joint corresponds to the human ankle and first short bones in the foot; the dog does not walk on the heel as people do.

== Temperament ==
The Greater Swiss Mountain Dog generally has an enthusiastic nature and strong affinity to people and children. This breed is often described as sociable, active, calm and dignified. While the breed does need exercise, they do not need a large space. The breed often stands close to their owners, rarely straying far away without checking in.

== Health ==
For the most part, this breed is relatively healthy for their size; Greater Swiss Mountain Dogs have far fewer problems than more populous breeds in the similar size range.

=== Abdominal health issues ===
The spleen is located in the left cranial abdomen and is held loosely in place by ligaments. Primary diseases of the spleen are splenic torsion and splenic tumors. Splenic torsion occurs when the spleen twists along the axis of the blood supply. Symptoms of splenic torsion include lethargy, abdominal distension and pale mucous membranes. One theory for the development of splenic torsion is that for dogs with chronic intermittent gastric dilatation, the dilation causes the spleen's ligaments to stretch and increases the spleen's mobility within the abdomen. The spleen becomes torsed because it is no longer anchored in its correct location.

== Lifespan ==
Heavier dogs such as the Greater Swiss Mountain Dogs tend to have shorter lifespans than medium- and small-sized dogs; longevity is inversely related to breed size. Two websites list the life expectancy for Greater Swiss Mountain Dogs at 10 to 11 years; another lists it as 8–10 years. A survey by the US breed club shows a median lifespan of 6.75 years. Dog lifespans may vary in different countries, even in the same breed.

== Kennel club and pet registry recognition ==
- The Grosser Schweizer Sennenhund, or Greater Swiss Mountain Dog, is recognised internationally by the Fédération Cynologique Internationale (FCI). They are in Group 2, Section 3 Swiss Mountain and Cattle Dogs; standards are dated March 25, 2003. The first standard was published not before February 5, 1939.
- The American Kennel Club (AKC) fully recognized the breed in 1995, and classifies them in the Working Group.
- The Canadian Kennel Club recognized the breed in 2006, and also places the breed in the Working Group.
- The United Kennel Club recognized the breed in 1992; they place the breed in the Guardian Dog Group.
- The Kennel Club, based in the United Kingdom, classifies the Greater Swiss Mountain Dog in the Working Group.
- The Continental Kennel Club (CKC) lists the Greater Swiss Mountain Dog and provides minimal information about the breed.
- The America's Pet Registry Inc. (APRI) does have a classified ad section for Greater Swiss Mountain Dogs.
- The American Canine Registry (ACR) lists the Greater Swiss Mountain Dog as an acceptable breed under their American Canine Registry section.
- As of May 2010 the breed is not recognised by the New Zealand Kennel Club or the Australian National Kennel Council.

== Four breeds of Sennenhund ==
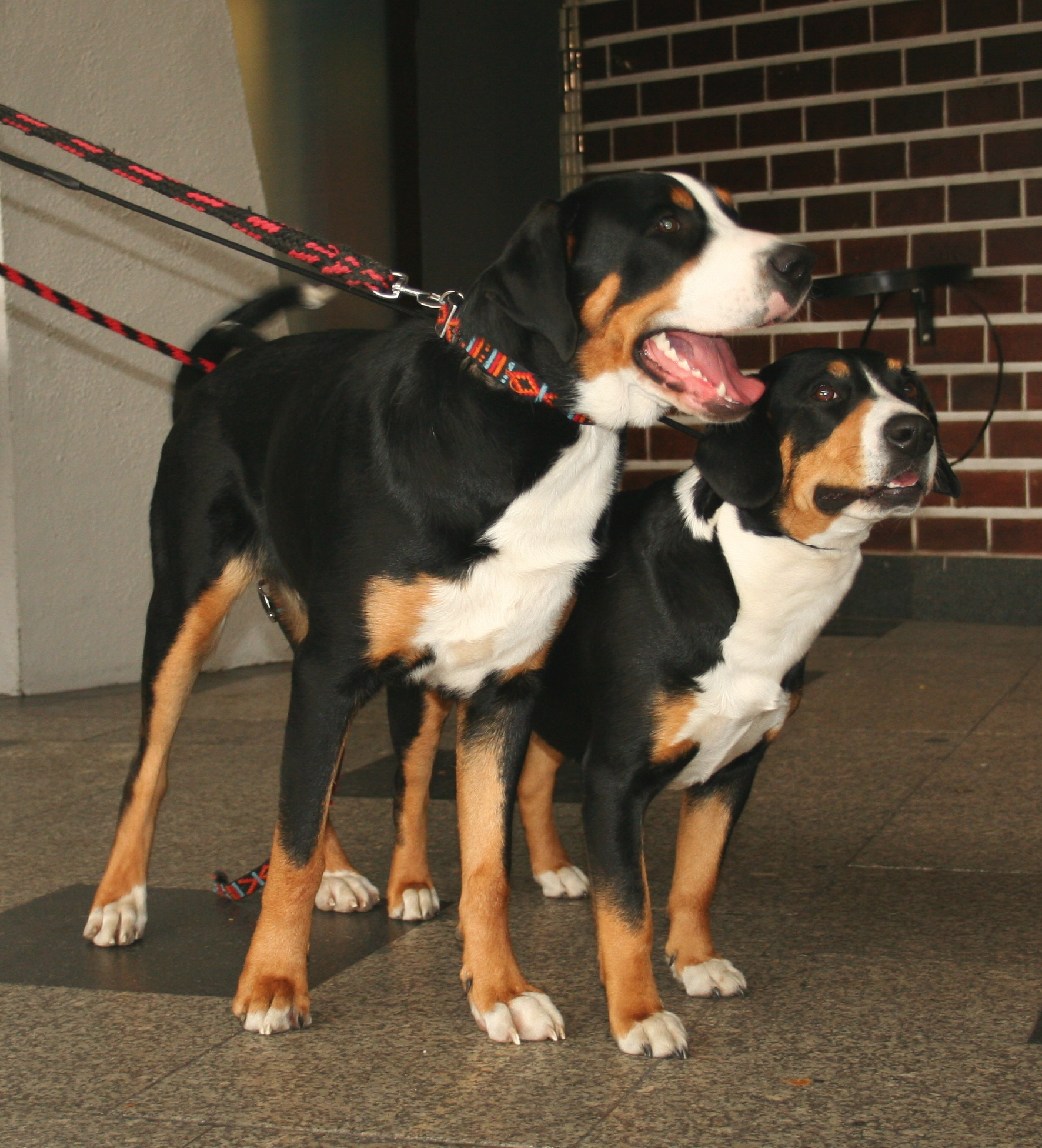
Greater Swiss Mountain Dog standing next to an Entlebucher Mountain Dog

The Greater Swiss Mountain Dog is considered the oldest of the Swiss breeds. It is the largest of the four Sennenhund breeds; all four have the same colors and markings, but are different sizes.

Evolutionary hierarchy suggests breeds should genetically cluster into groups sharing recent common ancestry. A genetic clustering algorithm could not easily distinguish between the obviously related pairs of Greater Swiss Mountain Dog and the Bernese Mountain Dog.

The four breeds of Sennenhund, with the original breed name followed by the most popular English version of the breed name:

- Grosser Schweizer Sennenhund, Greater Swiss Mountain Dog
- Berner Sennenhund, Bernese Mountain Dog
- Appenzeller Sennenhund, Appenzeller Mountain Dog
- Entlebucher Sennenhund, Entlebucher Mountain Dog

== Similar breeds ==
In addition to the three breeds mentioned in the previous section, Greater Swiss Mountain Dogs are related to other mountain dogs: Boxers, Bullmastiffs, Doberman Pinschers, Great Danes, Great Pyrenees, Komondors, Kuvaszes and mastiffs. The breed probably contributed to the development of the St. Bernard and the Rottweiler.

== See also ==
- List of dog breeds
- Carting
