= Drafting (dog) =

Dog bred for a specific type of work

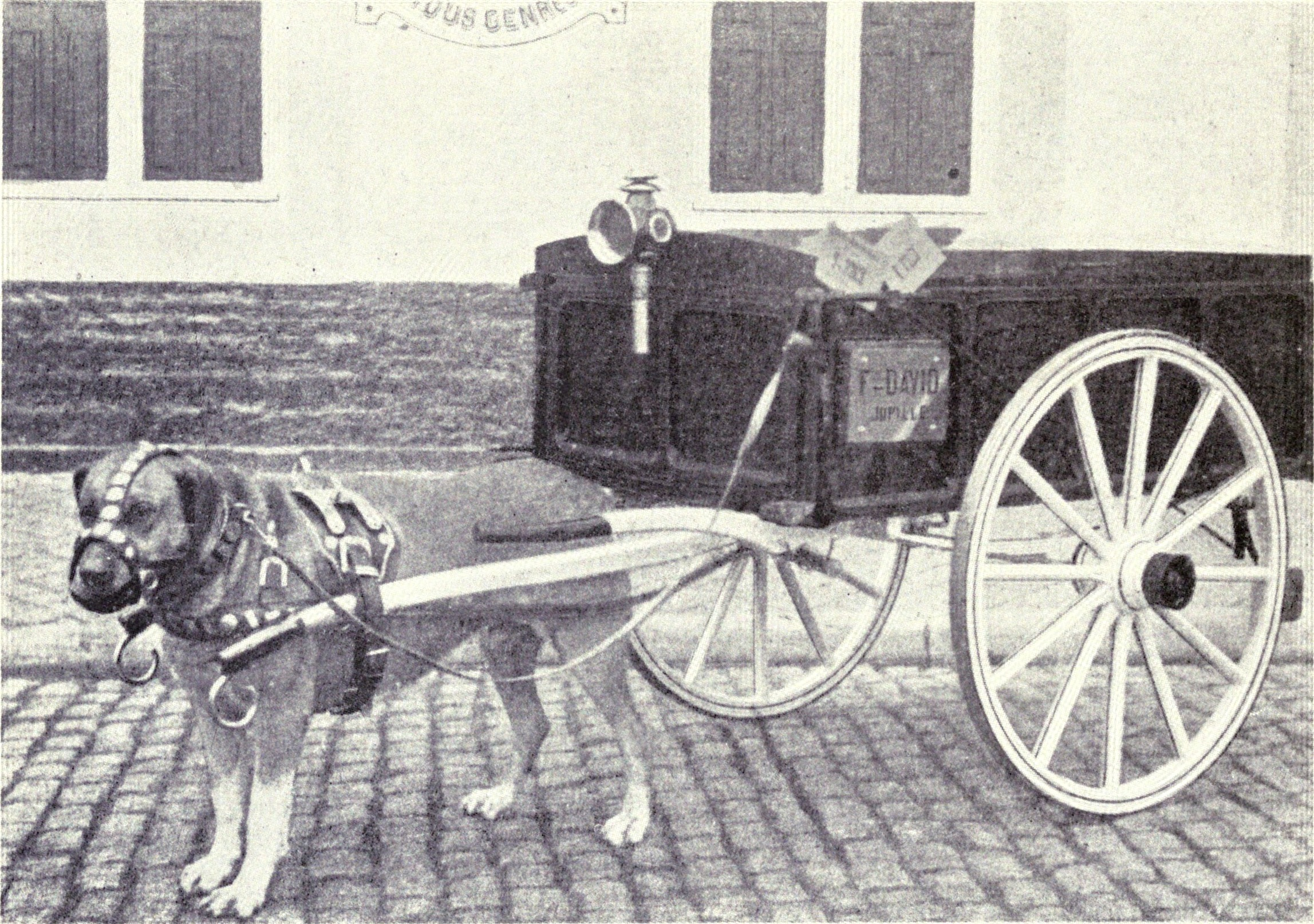
A drafting dog, 1915

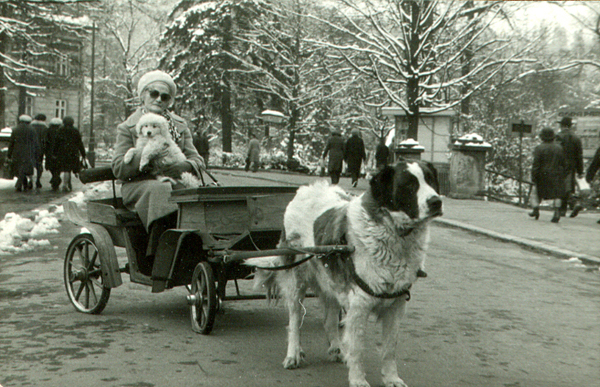
Dog pulling a carriage, Poland 2003

Drafting (also known as carting) is an activity or dog sport in which a dog (usually a large breed) pulls a cart or wagon filled with supplies, such as farm goods, camping equipment, groceries or firewood, but sometimes pulling people.

== History ==
Drafting involves dogs pulling a cart or wagon, a task historically performed to assist farmers with transporting goods.

=== Ancient ===
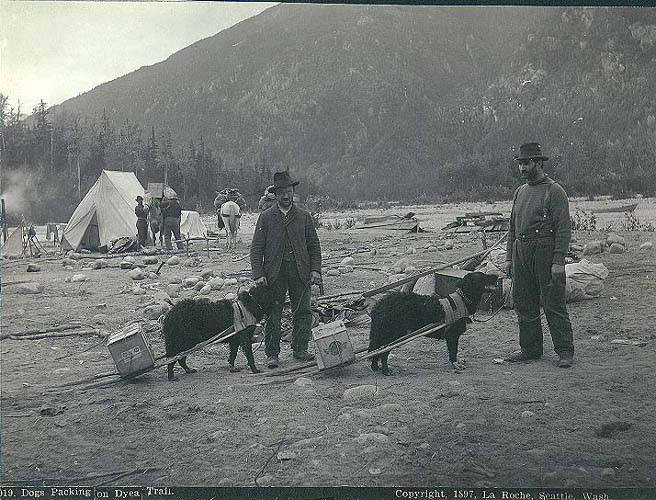
Dogs pulling travois, Alaska 1897

The use of the travois for drafting was practiced in North America, particularly among the Plains Indians. Significant historic routes, such as the Lewis and Clark Trail-Travois Road and Montana's Lewis and Clark Pass, were heavily traversed by travelers using travois. The repeated passage created deep, parallel grooves in the terrain—marks that remain visible today. Additional remnants of travois tracks can be found at the Knife River Indian Villages National Historic Site. Archaeological evidence indicates that travois were utilized prior to the invention of the wheel, with some tracks in New Mexico dated as far back as 22,000 years ago.

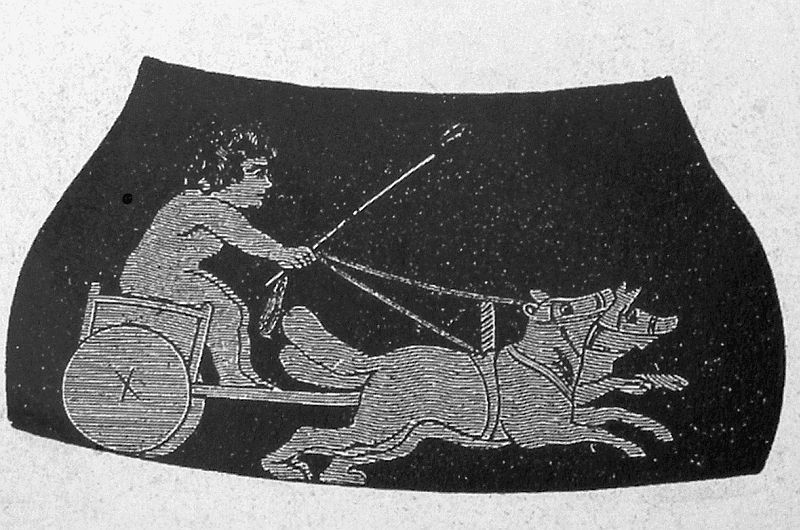
Greek vase depicting drafting dogs

Pottery depicting drafting in ancient Greece and Rome has been found dating back to the 2nd century BC. Roman Emperor Elagabalus was known to use drafting dogs, as described by historian Lampridius:

His four powerful dogs were not only fed from geese livers, but also attached to a carriage to drive inside his palace and on his lands.

=== Early modern and industrial Europe ===
Humanist Justus Lipsius (1547–1606) described witnessing drafting, writing:

In my youth, there was in Brussels an English dog breed, large and strong, employed by a tanner to pull his chariot full of skins to the market.

Among European nobility, these conveyances were frequently used recreationally. Ladies at court would race through the parks. In 1608, Louis XIII was seen guiding a small carriage pulled by two mastiffs, through the Grand Gallery of the Louvre.

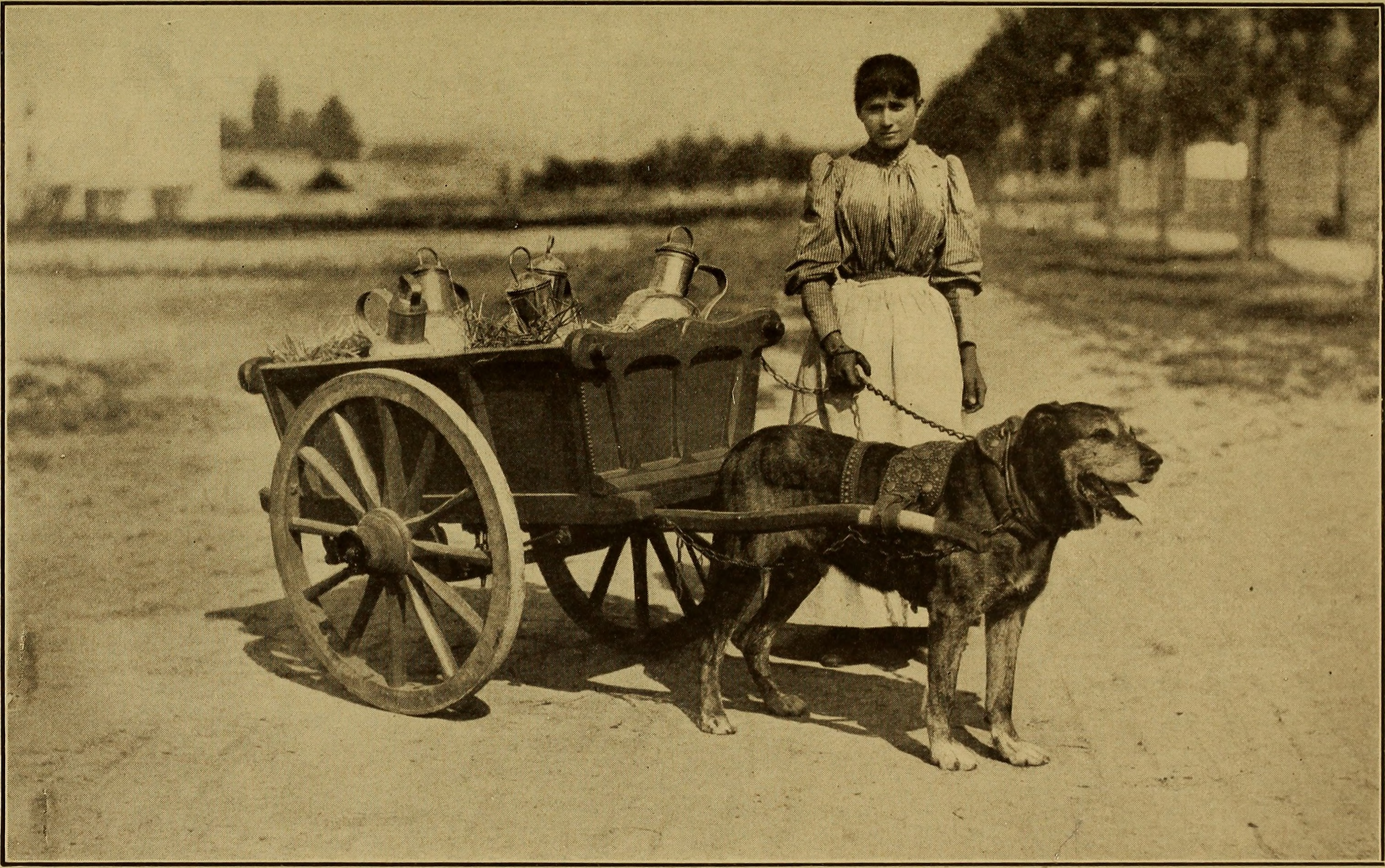
Milk churns being transported in a dog-pulled cart, 1911

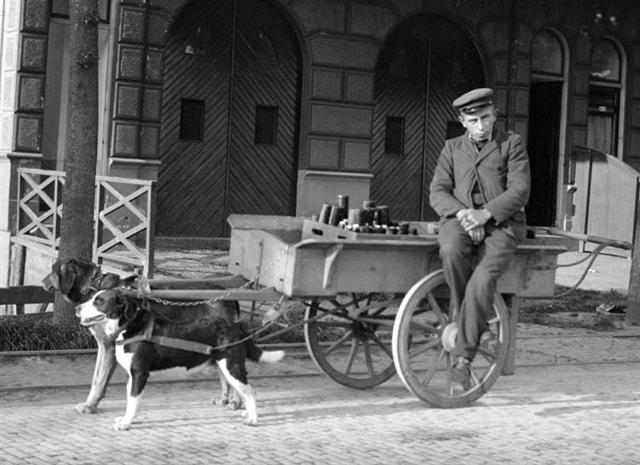
A two-dog cart, Netherlands 1904

Dog carts were historically used in Belgium and the Netherlands for delivering milk, bread, and other goods. In 1725, Martin Pegius noted in his book Fleischerbunde in Belgien (The Butchers' Dogs in Belgium) that dogs were commonly used to pull carts to and from markets, often without human accompaniment.

Drafting continued through the early 19th century as a practical means of transportation, particularly in rural areas. They served various purposes, including transporting goods, assisting in farming tasks, and even carrying passengers. In early Victorian Britain, dogcarts were associated with bakers, and when they used the area reserved for pedestrians, were considered a nuisance. In 1839, the Metropolitan Police Act introduced a ban on their use within a 15-mile radius of Charing Cross, citing both concerns for animal welfare and public health. Overworked dogs were believed to be more vulnerable to rabies, and a notable decline in reported cases followed by 1841 seemed to support this view. That same year, a nationwide ban on dog-drawn carts was enacted across the United Kingdom.

LVI – Dog Carts, &c. prohibited after 1st January 1840.

And be it enacted, That after the First Day of January next every Person who within the Metropolitan Police District shall use any Dog for the Purpose of drawing or helping to draw any Cart, Carriage, Truck, or Barrow shall be liable to a Penalty not more than Forty Shillings for the First Offence, and not more than Five Pounds for the Second or any following Offence.

— Metropolitan Police Act 1839, section 56; repealed by Statute Law (Repeals) Act 1973]

The legislation was not without opposition. Critics, particularly small traders who relied on dog carts as an affordable means of transporting goods, voiced concerns about the economic impact of the ban. Some even mocked the bill as trivial, suggesting that if dogs were prohibited from pulling carts, then Shetland ponies should also be banned under the same logic.

=== 20th century ===
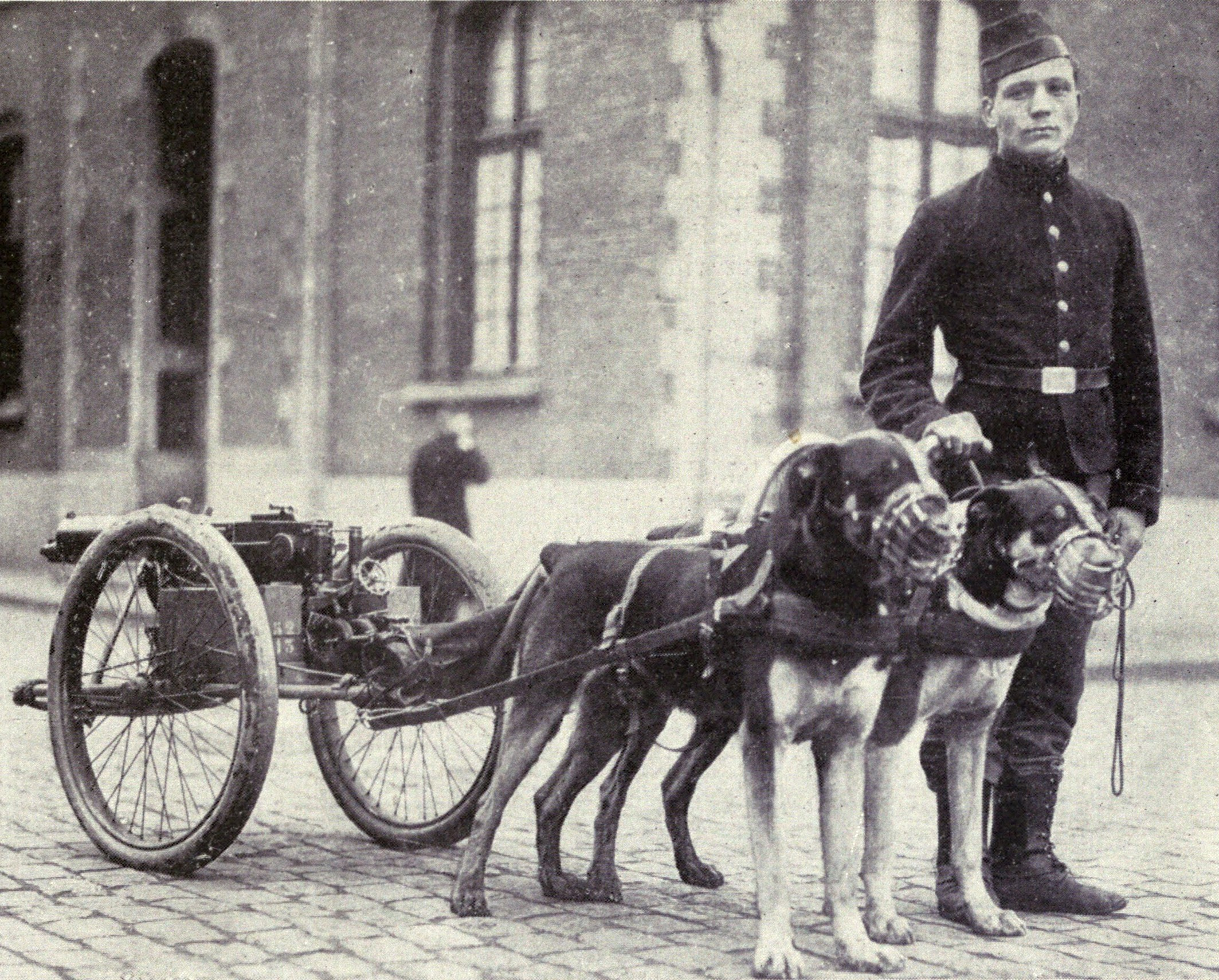
Military dogs pulling guns

During World War I, some military units utilized dog carts to transport supplies and equipment. The Belgian Army, for instance, employed large, strong dogs to pull carts carrying machine guns and ammunition, finding them more cost-effective and maneuverable than horses in certain terrains. The use of dog carts began to decline in the early 20th century due to advancements in motorized vehicles and concerns over animal welfare. In Britain, for example, the practice was prohibited in the early 1900s, leading to tragic outcomes for many working dogs who were abandoned or euthanized when they could no longer serve their purpose. Dogs were used by the Soviet Army in World War II to pull carts containing a stretcher for wounded soldiers.

== Practice ==
Today, drafting is a recreational activity that allows dogs to engage in purposeful work, which can be both mentally and physically fulfilling. Drafting may be done competitively and drafting as a sport is also known as dryland mushing and is practiced all around the world, often to keep winter sled dogs in competition form during the off-season. Mushing, bikejoring and dog scootering are all forms of drafting.

=== Equipment ===
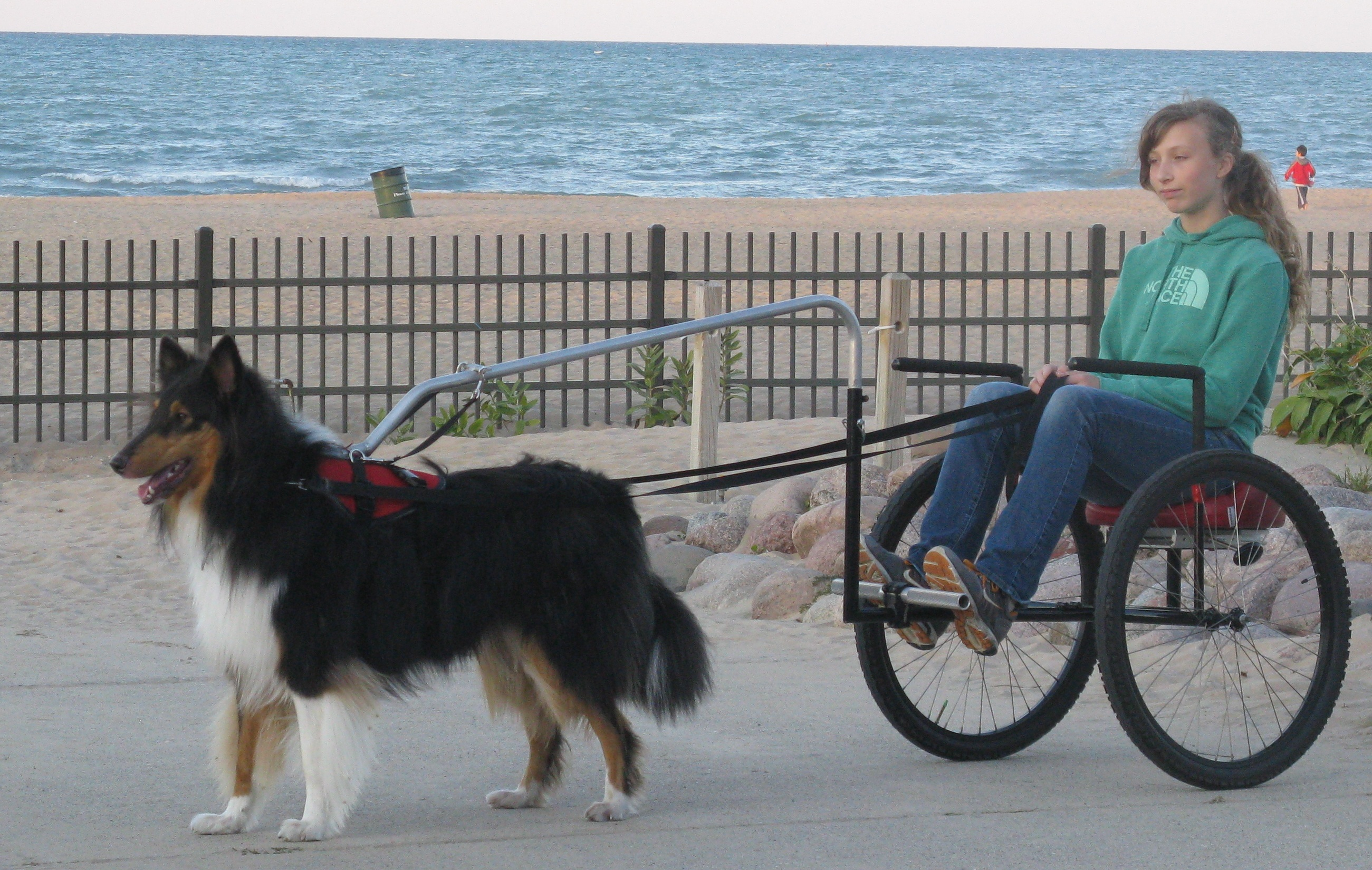
A modern two-wheeled dogcart with a dorsal hitch

A cart pulled by one or more dogs is often called a dogcart. The dog pulls the cart using a specially fitted harness designed to distribute the weight.

Dog cart pulling two boys in Murray Bay, Quebec, early 20th century

A variety of carting is sulky driving, where a dog or dogs pull a person in a vehicle called a sulky. This sport offers both exercise and discipline opportunities for energetic breeds. Many working breeds are happier when given a job or task, and carting/sulky driving can be a rewarding hobby for both dog and owner.

The sulky is designed to have little to no weight on the dog's back. A widely used model is the dorsal hitch, which involves only one shaft from the sulky that has negative weight (the center of mass of the cart is slightly behind the wheels) on the dog's harness. The dorsal hitch also allows easier going for the dog, with free range of movement as opposed to confining shafts on either side. This often simplifies initial training to the sulky, as the single high shaft does not interfere with the dog's movement.

Similar harnesses can be used for dogs to pull a person in a wheelchair. This sport is sometimes called "wheelchair mushing".

Dogcart is also the name of a type of horse-drawn vehicle that originally carried dogs to a hunt.

== Breeds ==
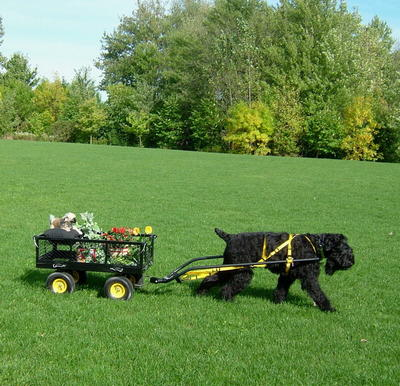
A Black Russian Terrier pulling a modern utility wagon, 2006

A dog being used for drafting might be called a drafting dog, draughting dog, carting dog, or pulling dog. Many dog breeds were bred for drafting and continue to excel and enjoy the activity due to their strength, work ethic, and temperament including Newfoundland dogs, Bernese Mountain Dogs, Greater Swiss Mountain Dogs, Saint Bernards, and Leonbergers as well as the Rottweiler, Bouvier des Flandres and the Belgian Mastiff.

The Greater Swiss Mountain Dog was a large working dog used by butchers, cattle dealers, manual workers and farmers, who used them as guard dogs, droving and draught dogs.

The Bernese Mountain Dog is a large working dog with a calm temperament ideal for pulling a cart, as they used to do in Switzerland. More recently they have been used to pull carts to give children rides, or to appear in parades.

While many dog breeds have a history of drafting, any healthy dog with a sound temperament can be used as long as the cart or wagon are within their abilities.

== In culture ==
Dog-drawn carts were frequently depicted in literature and art. The Dutch-Belgian artist Henriëtte Ronner-Knip (1821–1909) painted many pictures in the Romantic style of drafting dogs pulling dogcarts. Sled dogs were used to pull equipment and men efficiently over the snow and ice on Roald Amundsen's 1911 expedition to the South Pole.

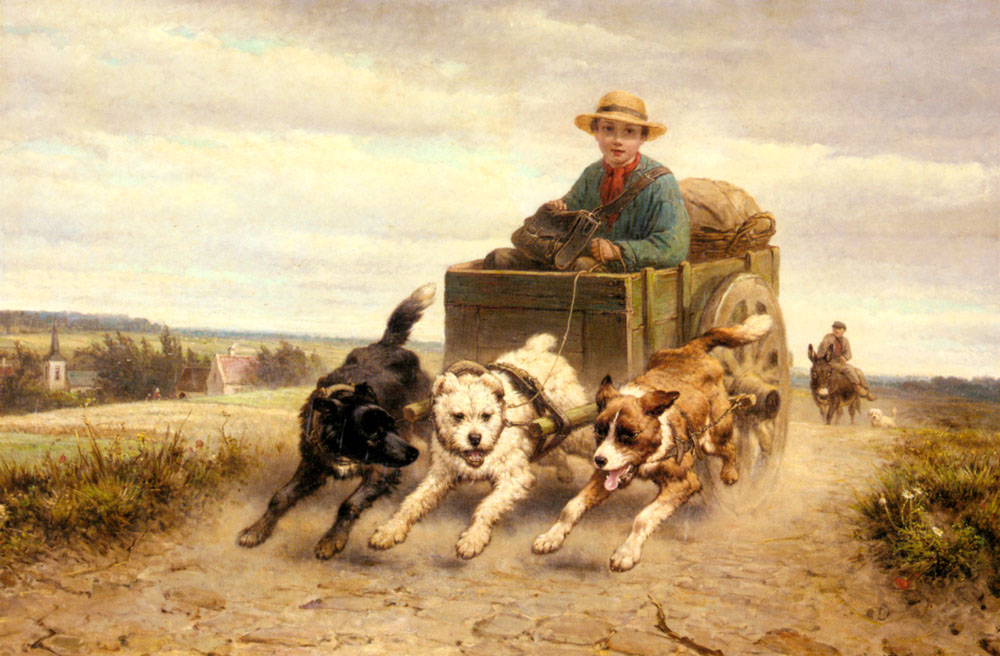
The Dog Cart, oil on canvas, Henriëtte Ronner-Knip

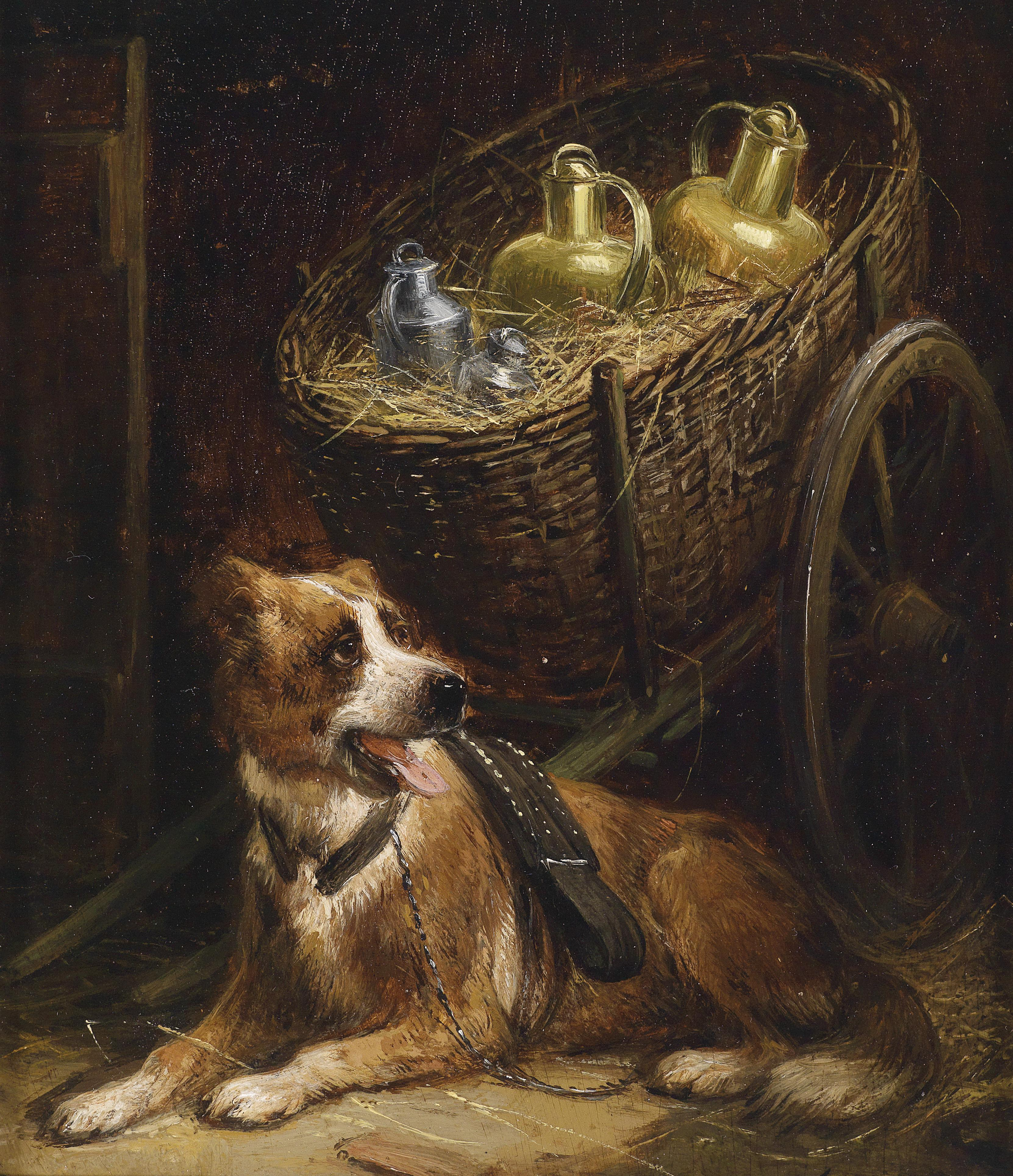
A Short Rest, oil on wood Henriëtte Ronner-Knip

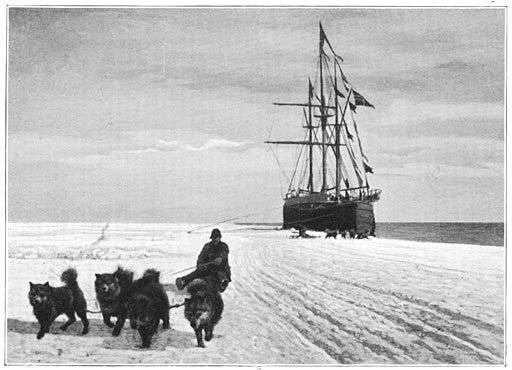
To the South Pole: photograph of sled dogs on Amundsen's South Pole expedition, 1911

== See also ==
- Dog travois
- Sled dog
- Working dog
- A Dog of Flanders – 1872 novel by Marie Louise de la Ramée
