= New Zealand Kennel Club =

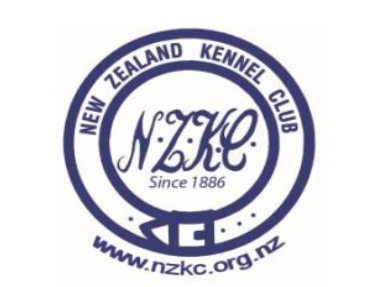
- Abbreviation: KC
- Formation: 1886; 140 years ago
- Type: Kennel club
- Region served: New Zealand
- Official language: English
- Website: www.nzkc.org.nz

The New Zealand Kennel Club (now trading as Dogs New Zealand, and also known as Dogs NZ and NZKC) is the primary kennel club responsible for dog pedigree registration services in New Zealand. They also provide training services, judging for dog shows and many other services relating to dog showing. The organisation was established in 1886, and since 2017 has traded as Dogs New Zealand. The club is a member of the FCI.

== Operation ==
The New Zealand Kennel Club is an organisation that operates at two levels, which includes the Affiliated Societies and Individual Membership. NZKC now has over 300 societies affiliated to, associated with and recognised by it. There are several types of Associated clubs include the Show Clubs; the Obedience Clubs; the Combined Show and Obedience Clubs and the Agility Clubs. Recognised Clubs are either clubs which cater for minority breeds, newly formed clubs or clubs that do not cater show or Dog Training.

== NZKC Administration ==
The club's administrative office is at Prosser Street, Porirua, Wellington, next to the Exhibition Centre. Administration looks after the day-to-day management of the New Zealand Kennel Club. Administration deals mainly with the register, membership matters, the NZ Dog World and the website.
