= Bernese Mountain Dog =

Swiss breed of dog

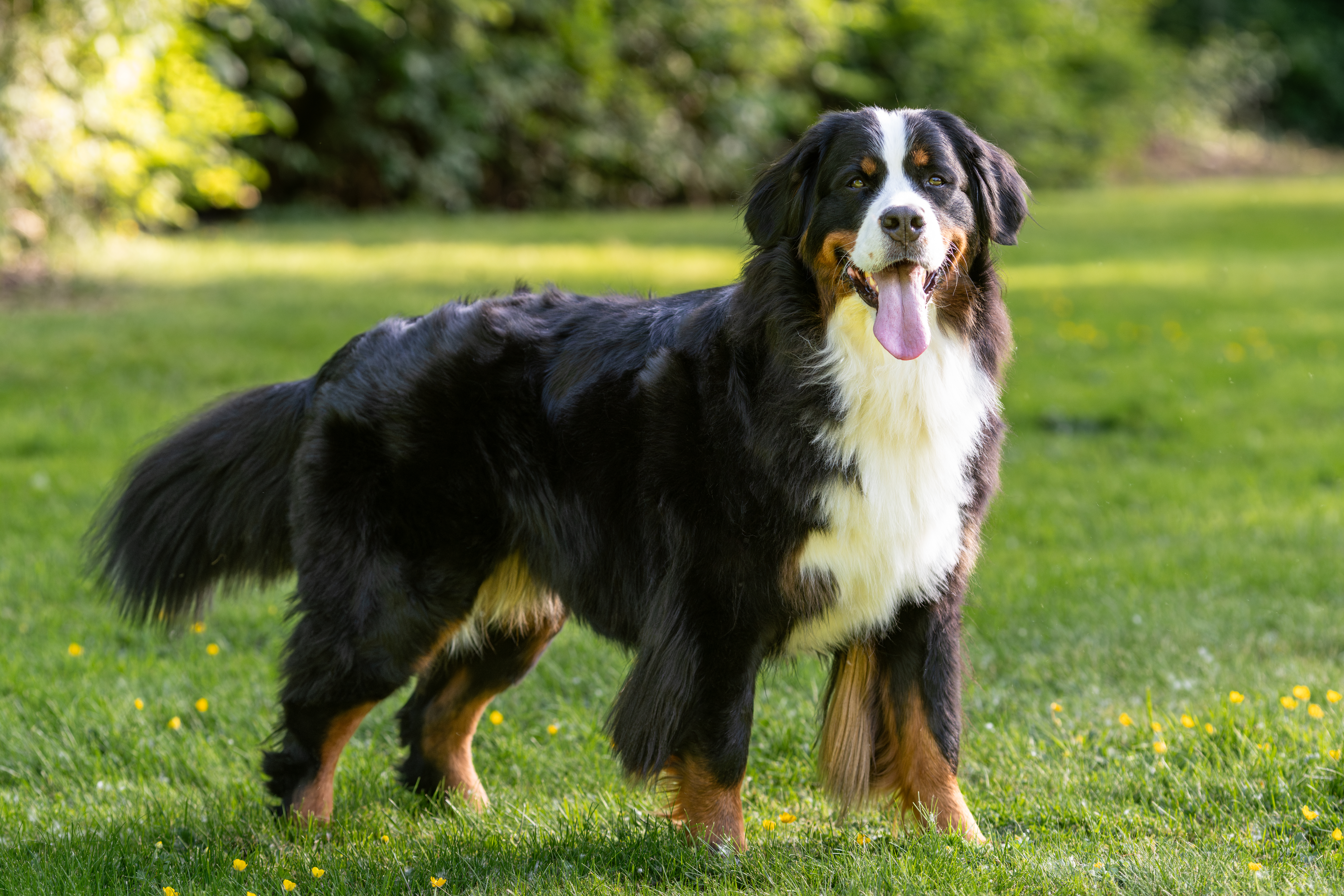
- Other names: Berner Sennenhund; Bernese Cattle Dog; Bouvier Bernois; Dürrbächler
- Origin: Switzerland
Traits
Height	Males	64–70 cm (25–28 in)
	Females	58–66 cm (23–26 in)
Weight	Males	36–55 kg (80–120 lb)
	Females	34–45 kg (75–100 lb)
- Coat: double
- Colour: tricolour (black, rust, and white)
- Litter size: average 5–7, up to 15
Kennel club standards
- Schweizerischer Klub für Berner Sennenhunde: standard
- Fédération Cynologique Internationale: standard

The Bernese Mountain Dog, German: Berner Sennenhund or Dürrbächler, is a large dog breed originating from the canton of Bern, Switzerland and the Swiss Alps. It is one of four Sennenhund-type breeds, with ancestral roots in Roman mastiffs. The name Berner (or Bernese in English) refers to the breed's area of origin in the canton of Bern, and Sennenhund is derived from the German Senne ("alpine pasture") and Hund ("hound/dog"), as they accompanied the alpine herders and dairymen called Senne (m pl; Senn, m sg). Historically used as a general farm dog, the large Sennenhunde also pulled carts as draft animals. The breed was formally recognized in 1912.

== History ==
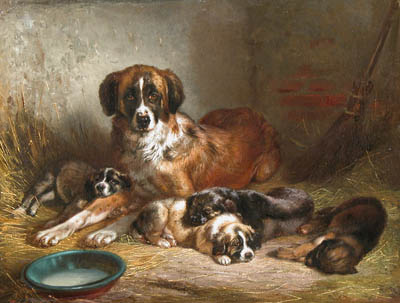
Benno Adam, Bernese Mountain Dog and Her Pups, 1862

Historically, in some locales at least, the breed was called a Dürrbachhund or Dürrbächler, for a small town (Dürrbach) where the large dogs were especially frequent.

The dogs have roots in the Roman mastiffs.

The breed was used as an all-purpose farm dog for guarding property and to drive dairy cattle long distances from the farm to the alpine pastures. The farmers used the dogs to transport their carts of milk and cheese and were known by the locals as "Cheese Dogs." In the early 1900s, fanciers exhibited the few examples of the large dogs at shows in Bern, and in 1907 a few breeders from the Burgdorf region founded the first breed club, the Schweizerischer Dürrbach-Klub, and wrote the first Standard which defined the dogs as a separate breed. By 1910, there were already 107 registered members of the breed. There is a photo of a working Bernese Mountain Dog, dated 1905 at the Fumee Fall rest area in Quinnesec, Michigan.

In 1937, the American Kennel Club recognised the breed. Today, the club classifies it as a member of the Working Group. In the US the Bernese Mountain Dog is growing in popularity, ranking in 19th place by the American Kennel Club in 2024.

These dogs are very popular as family dogs in German-speaking countries. The German Association of Dog Breeders listed the Bernese at the 11th rank per live births in 2014.

== Appearance ==
=== Colouring ===
Like the other Sennenhunde, the Bernese Mountain Dog is a large, heavy dog with a distinctive tri-coloured coat, black with white chest and rust-coloured markings above eyes, sides of the mouth, front of legs, and out around the white chest. However, it is the only breed of Sennenhund dogs with a long coat. The ideal of a perfectly marked individual gives the impression of a white horseshoe shape around the nose, which is always black. There is a white "Swiss cross" on the chest when viewed from the front. A "Swiss kiss" is a white mark located typically behind the neck, but may be a part of the neck. A full ring would not meet the type standard. The AKC breed standard lists, as disqualifications, blue eye colour and any ground colour other than black.

=== Height and weight ranges ===
Dogs stand some 64–70 cm at the withers, bitches some 58–66 cm; ideal heights according to the international breed standard are in the ranges 66–68 cm and 60–63 cm respectively. Weights are approximately in the range 35–55 kg for dogs and 35–45 kg for bitches.

=== Physical traits ===
Considered a dry-mouthed breed, the Bernese Mountain Dog is slightly longer than it is tall, highly muscular, with a strong, wide back. The head of a Bernese Mountain Dog is flat on the top with a moderate stop, and the ears are medium-sized, triangular, set high, and rounded at the top. The teeth have a scissors bite. The legs of the Bernese are straight and strong, with round, arched toes. The rear dewclaws of the Bernese are often removed. Its bushy tail is carried low.

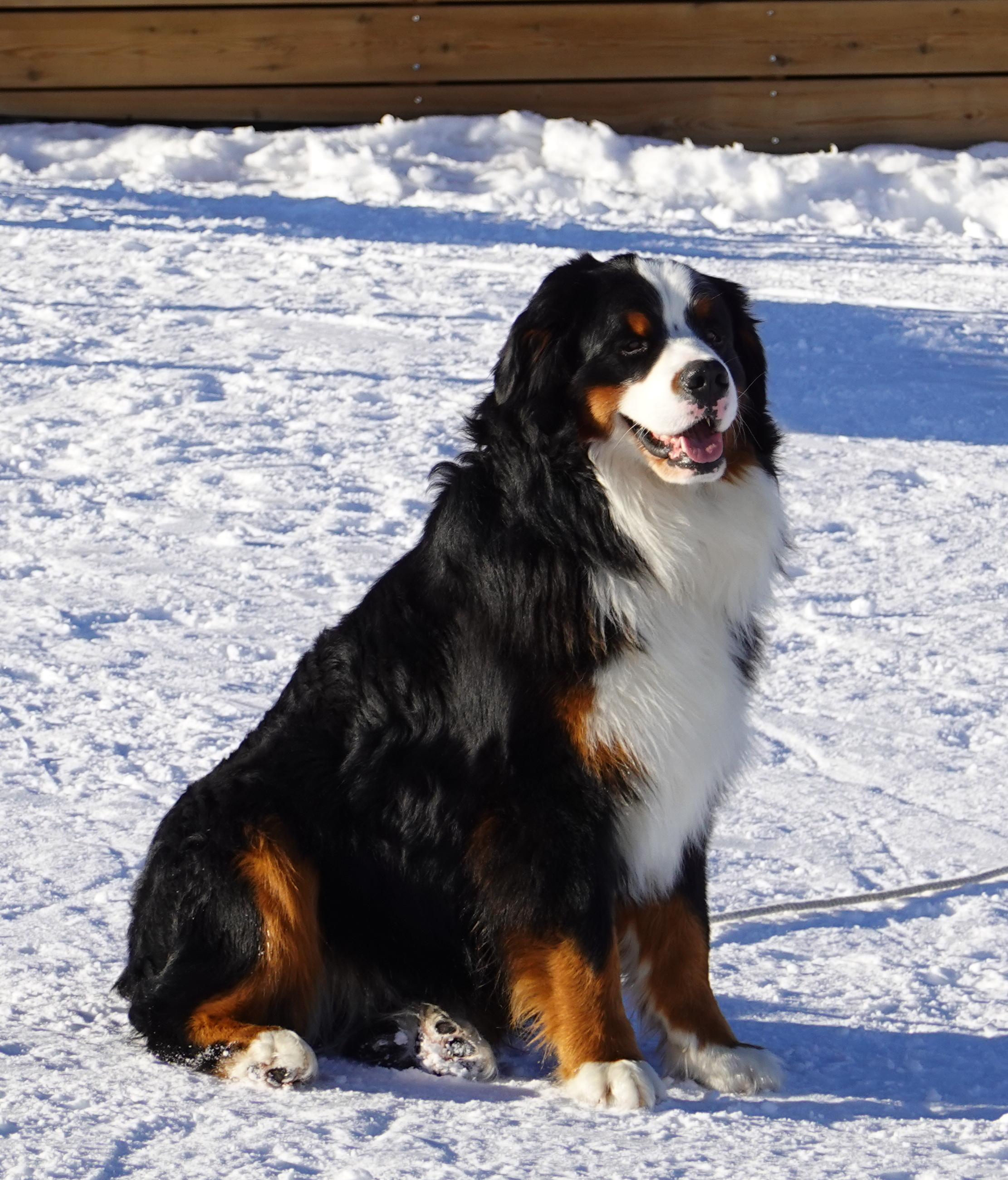
In snow

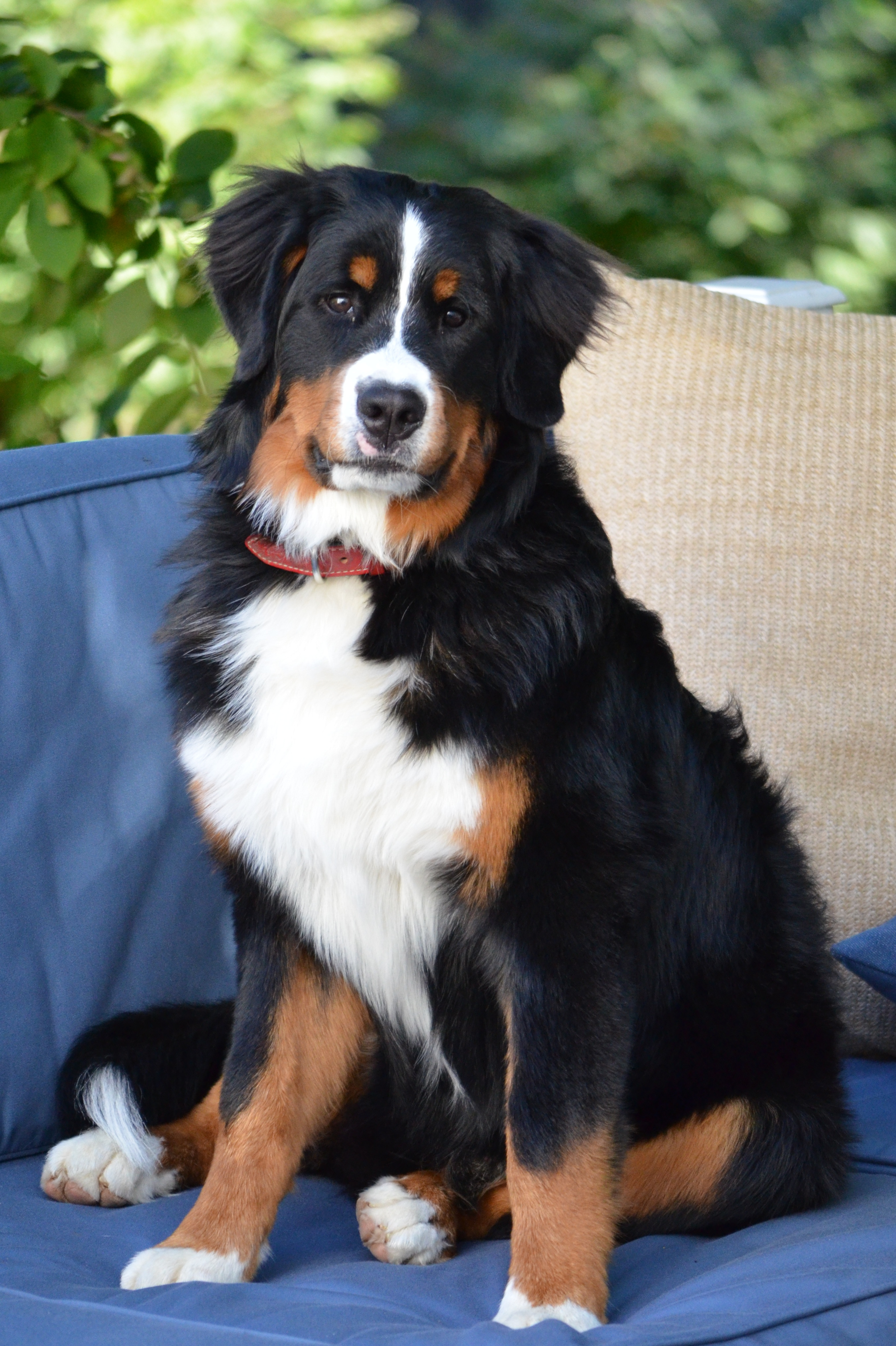
At nine months

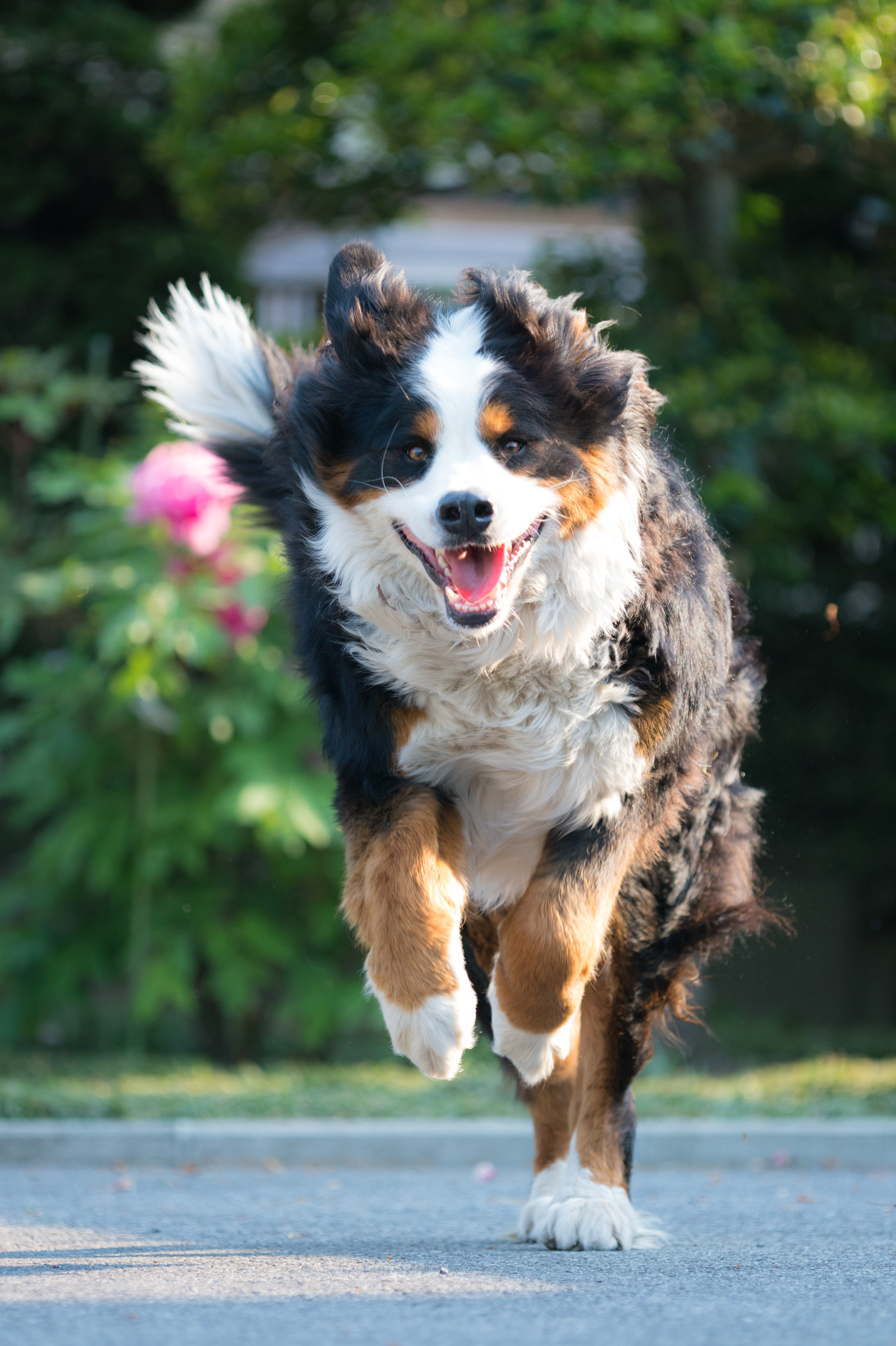
Running

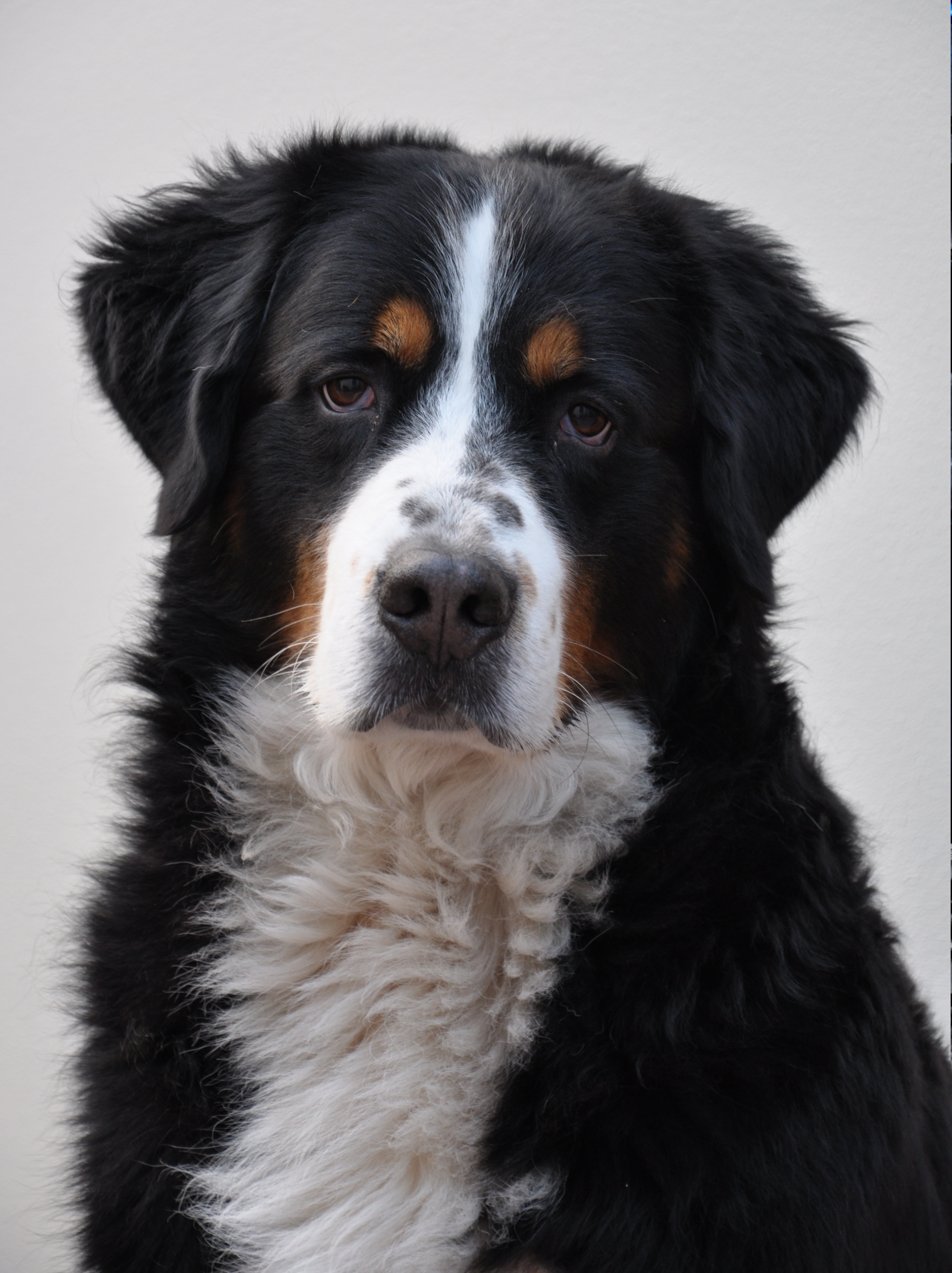
Head close-up

== Health ==
=== Medical problems ===
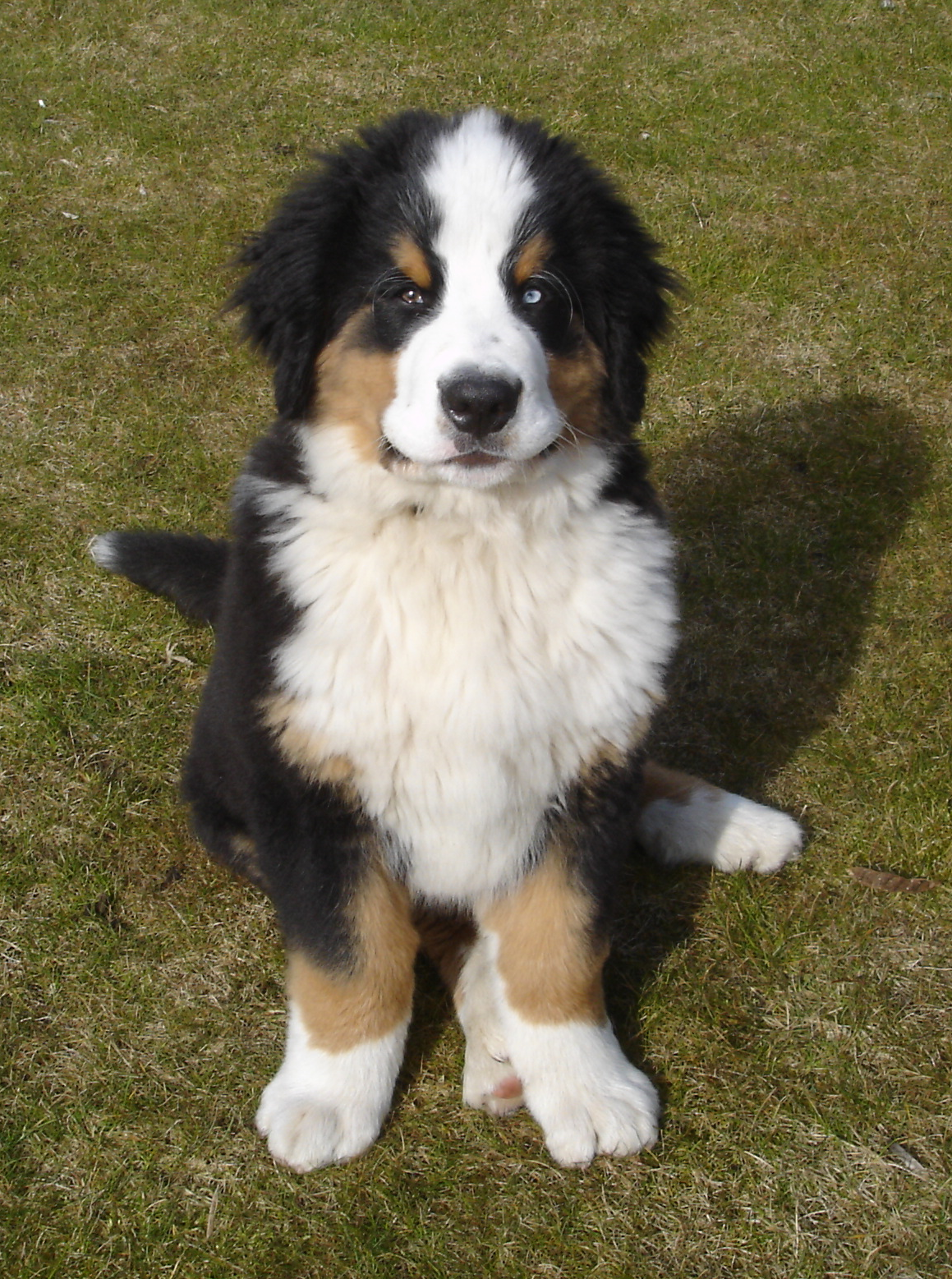
Dog with Heterochromia iridum

Bernese Mountain Dogs have a high frequency of neoplasia. One study found 55% of deaths to be attributable to cancer. The breed has a high prevalence of elbow dysplasia, with studies ranging from a prevalence of 13.91% to 26%. An allele of the SOD1 gene: SOD1:c.52T has only been found in the Bernese Mountain Dog with 3.5% of Bernese Mountain Dogs having this allele. This mutation is associated with canine degenerative myelopathy. Another mutation associated with the condition — although not exclusive to the breed — has a prevalence of 38% in the Bernese Mountain Dog. The Bernese Mountain Dog has an increased prevalence of immune-mediated glomerulonephritis. A Swiss study found both the incidence and mortality of renal disease to be higher in this breed than any other — the incidence was 3.2 times higher than the average and the mortality was 8.2 times the average. The breed has a high risk of developing high-grade mastocytoma, with an Austrian study finding Bernese Mountain Dogs being three times as likely to have the condition than the general population.

Histiocytosis is a rare group of disorders that involve a build up of histiocytes in tissue and organs, causing damage to the tissue or organ. It may be benign or malignant. Malignant histiocytosis is a rapidly progressive multisystem cancerous disease that affects the Bernese Mountain Dog. It's a familial disease with a heritability value of 0.298 and accounts for a quarter of all tumours in the breed. Other histiocytosis conditions such as systemic histiocytosis and cutaneous histiocytosis are also more prevalent in the breed. Mutations have been identified that are believed to play a role in this are mutations to genes that help suppress tumours, including: CDKN2A/B, PTEN, and RB1. Another related mutation is to the PTPN11 gene, which is known to be related to histiocytosis and cancer in humans.

The Bernese Mountain Dog is one of the more commonly affected breeds for type I von Willebrand's disease.

=== Life expectancy ===
Despite the fact that larger breeds have a lower life expectancy than smaller breeds the life expectancy of the Bernese Mountain Dog is still low even when compared to breeds of similar size.

- In a 2016 Swiss study the life expectancy was found to be 8.4 years, based on the deaths of 381 out of 389 dogs in the study.
- A 2013 Dutch study found a life expectancy of 8 years.
- A 2024 UK study found a life expectancy of 10.1 years compared to 12 years for crossbreeds and 12.7 years for purebreds.
- A 2013 French study found a life expectancy of 8.1 years.
- A Swedish study from 2005 found 72% of Bernese Mountain Dogs to have died before reaching 10 years of age.

== Care ==
=== Activities ===
The Bernese's calm temperament makes them a natural for pulling small carts or wagons, a task they originally performed in Switzerland. With proper training they enjoy giving children rides in a cart or participating in a parade, such as the Conway, New Hampshire holiday parade. Regional Bernese clubs often offer carting workshops. Carting competitions are held for the breed. (Note: For example, the Bernese Mountain Dog Club of America offers drafting trials open to all breeds; dogs can earn eight different titles—four as individual dogs (Novice Draft Dog, Advanced Novice Draft Dog, Draft Dog, and Master Draft Dog) and four brace titles, in which two dogs work one cart together. Regional Bernese clubs often offer carting workshops.)

On July 1, 2010, the Bernese Mountain Dog became eligible to compete in AKC Herding Events. Herding instincts and trainability can be measured at noncompetitive herding tests. Berners exhibiting basic herding instincts can be trained to compete in herding trials.

The breed is "energetic, attentive, impetuous," but indisposed to biting. They tend to attach to one person, and have an inherent suspicion of strangers. In Switzerland they excel at herd guardianship, especially in the Holy Regions. They are untiring, often unruly, resistant to the coldest winters, and excellent defenders of stable or home. They have been used by the police in Switzerland.
