= Leonberger =

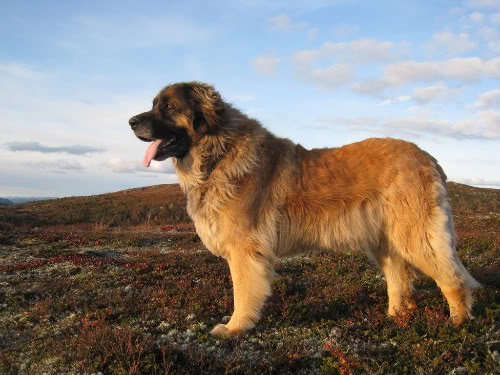
- Common nicknames: Leo
- Origin: Germany
Traits
Height	Males	72–80 cm (28–31 in)
	Females	65–75 cm (26–30 in)
- Coat: Long and coarse with mane on neck and chest and feathering on extremities
- Colour: Yellow, red, reddish brown or sandy including all combinations in between, with a black mask
Kennel club standards
- VDH: standard
- Fédération Cynologique Internationale: standard

The Leonberger is a German breed of large dog. The breed name derives from that of the city of Leonberg, in Baden-Württemberg, where it was bred in the mid-nineteenth century.

== History ==
The coat of arms of Leonberg

In the 1830s, Heinrich Essig, a dog breeder and seller and mayor of the town of Leonberg near Stuttgart in Baden-Württemberg, Germany, claimed to have created the Leonberger by crossing a female Landseer Newfoundland with a "barry" male from the Great St Bernard Hospice and Monastery (which would later create the Saint Bernard). Later, according to Essig, a Pyrenean Mountain Dog was added, resulting in very large dogs with the long, white coats that were the fashion for the time, and a pleasant temperament. The first dogs registered as Leonbergers were born in 1846 and had many of the prized qualities of the breeds from which they were derived. The legend is that the dogs were bred to be an homage of the lion in the town crest and coat-of-arms animal of Leonberg, the lion. The Leonberger dog became popular with several European royal households, including Napoleon II, Empress Elisabeth of Austria, the Prince of Wales, Otto Von Bismarck, Emperor Napoleon III, and Umberto I of Italy. Essig's claim of breeding the dog as described is disputed. Records from as early as 1585 may indicate the existence of Leonberger-type dogs; documents dating from 1601 held by the Metternich family describe similar dogs used to deter the theft of livestock. Either way, no doubt exists that Essig named and registered the breed first. A black-and-white engraving of the Leonberger was included in The Illustrated Book of the Dog by Vero Shaw (at p. 488) in 1881. At the time, Essig's Leonbergers were denounced as an indifferent knockoff of a St. Bernard—not a stable and recognized breed—and a product of a popular fad or fashion for large and strong dogs, fomented in part by Essig's prodigious marketing skills (he gave dogs to the rich and famous).

The modern look of the Leonberger, with darker coats and black masks, was developed during the latter part of the 20th century by reintroducing other breeds, such as the Newfoundland. This was necessary because breeding stocks of the Leonberger were seriously affected by the two world wars. Only five Leonbergers survived World War I and were bred until World War II when, again, almost all Leonbergers were lost. During the two world wars, Leonbergers were used to pull the ammunition carts, a service to the breed's country that resulted in the Leonbergers' near-destruction. Karl Stadelmann and Otto Josenhans are credited as the breed's saviors, bringing them back from almost extinction. Leonbergers today can have their ancestry traced to the eight dogs that survived World War II.

Traditionally, Leonbergers were kept as farm dogs and were much praised for their abilities in watchdog and draft work. They were frequently seen pulling carts around the villages of Bavaria and surrounding districts. Around the beginning of the 20th century, Leonbergers were imported by the government of Canada for use as water rescue/lifesaving dogs. The breed continues in that role today, along with the Newfoundland, Labrador Retriever, and Golden Retriever; they are used at the Italian School of Canine Lifeguard. They have been used successfully as flock guard dogs.

The Leonberger received American Kennel Club recognition as a member of the Working Group on January 1, 2010, alongside the Icelandic Sheepdog and the Cane Corso. It was the 167th breed to be recognized by the AKC.

== Description ==
=== Appearance ===
The Leonberger is a large, muscular, and elegant dog with balanced body type, medium temperament, and dramatic presence. The head is adorned with a striking black mask. Remaining true to their early roots as a capable family and working dog and search-and-rescue dog (particularly water), the surprisingly agile Leonberger is sound and coordinated, with both strength in bearing and elegance in movement. A sexually dimorphic breed, the Leonberger possesses either a strongly masculine or elegantly feminine form, making gender immediately discernible. The breed has webbed paws and a thick, dense double coat.

=== Size, proportion, and substance ===
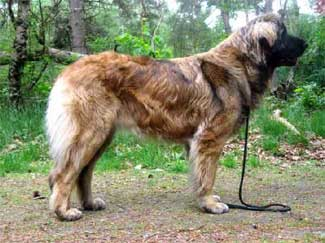
Leonberger female

Height at withers:

- Male: 71–80 cm (28–31 in), average 75 cm (30 in)
- Female: 65–75 cm (26–30 in), average 70 cm (28 in)

Weight:

- Males: 120–170 lb (54–77 kg), average 145 lb (66 kg)
- Females: 100–135 lb (45–61 kg), average 115 lb (52 kg)

While the breed standard specifies height but does not prescribe a specific weight, weight is expected to be proportionate to height. Individuals exceeding the standard height are seldom disqualified on that basis alone, provided they remain well-proportioned. A male Leonberger may be correctly proportioned even at a weight of 185 lb (84 kg)

Capable of demanding work, the Leonberger is a dog of ample substance. Its frame is supported with well-muscled, medium to heavy bone in direct proportion to its size. A roomy chest is sufficiently broad and deep for the purpose of work. Seen in profile, the chest curves inward from the prosternum, tangentially joins at the elbow to its underline at 50% of the withers' height, and then continues slightly upward toward the stifle.

=== Head ===
The head is well balanced in proportion to the size of the dog and is deeper than broad with the length of muzzle and the length of skull roughly equal. With close-fitting eyelids, the eyes are set into the skull upon a slight oblique; the eyes are medium-sized, almond-shaped, and colored dark brown. The ears are fleshy, moderately sized, and pendant-shaped, with sufficient substance to hang close to the skull and drop the tip of the ears level with the inside corners of the mouth. The Leonberger's ears rise from halfway between the eye and the top of the skull to level with the top of the skull. Though level bites and slight anomalies not affecting the robustness of the lower jaw are common, the ideal Leonberger possesses a strong scissor bite with full dentition.

=== Coat ===
Both a necessity for work and a defining attribute of the breed, the Leonberger has a dense water-resistant long double coat on the body that is complemented by the shorter, fine hair on the muzzle and limbs. The long, profuse, outer coat is durable, relatively straight, lies flat, and fits close. A mature, masculine Leonberger exhibits a pronounced mane. Similarly, his tail is very well furnished from the tip to the base where it blends harmoniously with the breech's furnishings. Climate permitting, his undercoat is soft and dense. Apart from a neatening of the feet, the Leonberger is presented untrimmed. These dogs are ill-suited to hot climates.

=== Colour ===
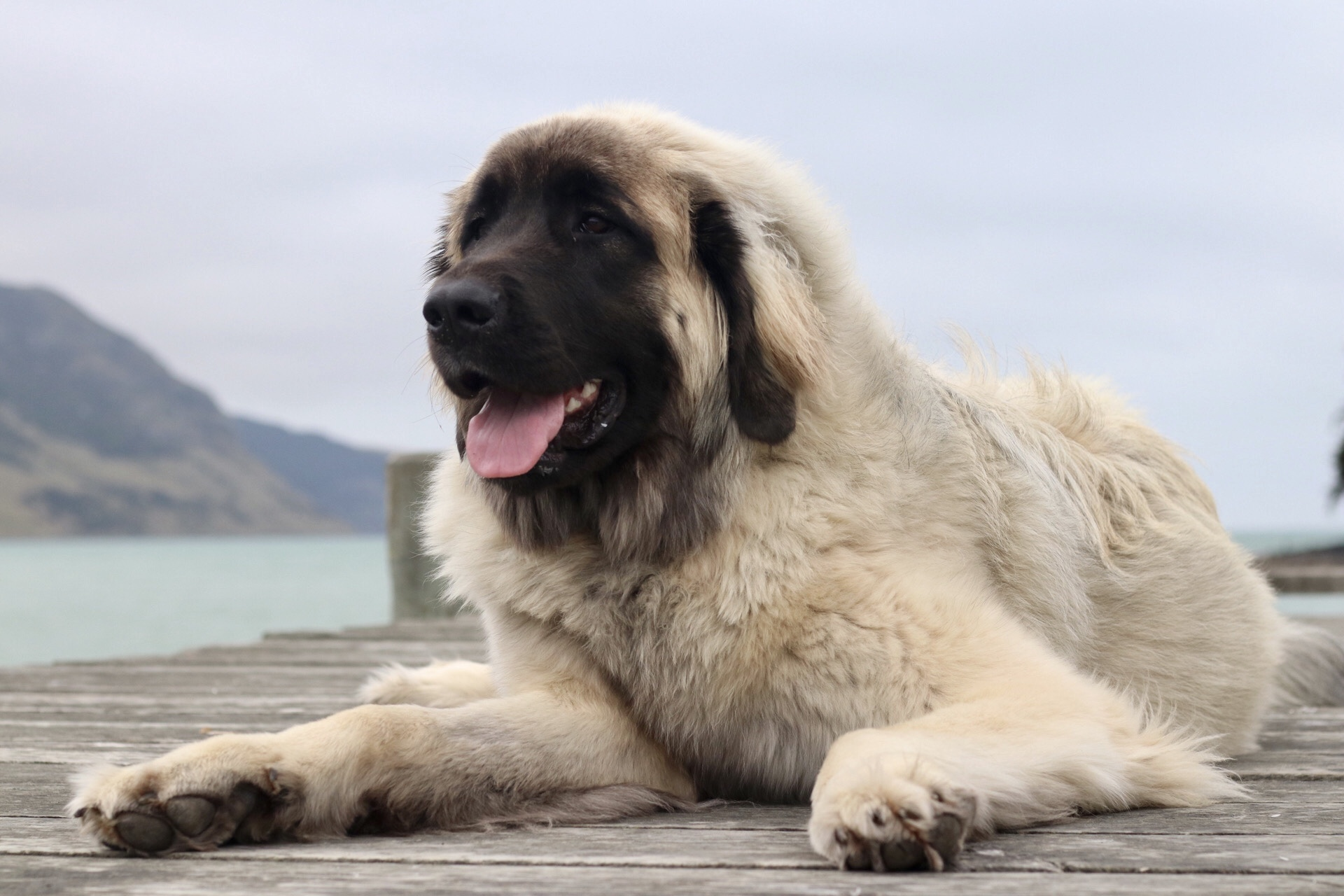
A female sand-colored Leonberger

Several coat colours are acceptable, including all combinations of lion-yellow, red, red-brown, and sand. Nose leather, foot pads, and lips should always be black. Faulty colours include brown with brown nose leather, black and tan, black, white, or silver, and eyes without any brown. A small patch of white on the chest or toes is permitted.

=== Temperament ===
First and foremost a family dog, the Leonberger's temperament is one of its most important and distinguishing characteristics. Well socialized and trained, the Leonberger is self-assured, insensitive to noise, submissive to family members, friendly toward children, well composed with passersby, and self-disciplined when obliging its family or property with protection. Robust, loyal, intelligent, playful, and kindly, they can thus be taken anywhere without difficulty and adjust easily to a variety of circumstances, including the introduction of other dogs. Proper control and early socialization and training are essential, as this is a giant breed.

"This is an outstanding water rescue dog. Only a short period of training it needed to augment its natural instincts." Its double-layered waterproof coat traps air and aids in buoyancy. Webs between the toes make for a powerful swimmer.

== Health ==
A 2024 UK study found a life expectancy of 10 years for the breed compared to an average of 12.7 for purebreeds and 12 for crossbreeds. A 2015 French study found a life expectancy of 8.75 years. A 2005 Swedish study of insurance data found 74% of Leonbergers died by the age of 10, higher than the overall rate of 35% of dogs dying by the age of 10.

An analysis of Leonberger pedigree found an inbreeding coefficient of 0.29 with just 22 founding dogs. From 1989 to 2004 the life expectancy dropped from 9.4 years to 7.7 years. Almost half suffered from at least one health condition and 21.5% suffered from neoplasia. The next most common group of conditions were orthopaedic and neurological at 15.8% and 14.8% respectively. The most common individual conditions were arthritis, polyneuropathy, hypothyroidism, gastric torsion, and dilated cardiomyopathy.

=== Musculoskeletal conditions ===
A Norwegian study found 25% of Leonbergers had hip dysplasia after 18 months of age.

=== Ophthalmological conditions ===
A study in the UK identified cataracts in 90 out of 211 Leonbergers surveyed.

=== Neurological conditions ===
A study found a high prevalence of neurological conditions in the Leonberger, which is likely due in large part to limited genetic diversity.

Multiple hereditary forms of polyneuropathy that are similar to the human disease Charcot-Marie-Tooth have been described in the Leonberger. A study concluded the most likely causes are autosomal dominant variants in the ARHGEF10 gene and in the GJA9 gene, and an autosomal recessive variant in the CNTNAP1 gene.

Another disease described in the breed is the juvenile-onset leukoencephalomyelopathy caused by an autosomal recessive variant in the NAPEPLD gene.

=== Neoplasia ===
The Leonberger has a predisposition to hemangiosarcoma and osteosarcoma. A study in the UK of more than 900,000 dogs looking at the annual prevalence of osteosarcoma found the Leonberger to have the second highest rate, at 1.48%, compared to 0.037% overall.

== In popular culture ==
The Lifetime TV movie Grumpy Cat's Worst Christmas Ever features a Leonberger that becomes a victim of a dognapping, co-starring with the famous Grumpy Cat.

In the story Murphy and the Great Surf Rescue in Gill Lewis' Puppy Academy series of children's books, Murphy is a Leonberger puppy whose special skill is swimming.

The graphic music video "Deutschland" by German rock band Rammstein portrays the symbolic figure of Germania giving birth to Leonberger puppies.

Leonberger dogs are represented in many stamps from around the world.

In Norwegian author Karin Fossum's Inspector Sejer series, the title character has a Leonberger named Kollberg.

Three Leonberger dogs (one was a female, and two males) played the main character Buck in The Call of the Wild: Dog of the Yukon (1997), a Canadian rendition of Jack London's Call of the Wild which stars Rutger Hauer as John Thornton and is narrated by Richard Dreyfuss. The breed chosen in this movie was not the one identified as Buck in the novel.
