= Hygroma =

Hygroma may refer to:

- Cystic hygroma
- Subdural hygroma
- Hygroma (canine disease) – swelling on or near a dog's elbow

== See also ==
- Bursitis
- Hematoma
