= Cimetière des Chiens et Autres Animaux Domestiques =

Pet cemetery and monument in France

Coordinates: 48°54′34″N 2°17′48″E

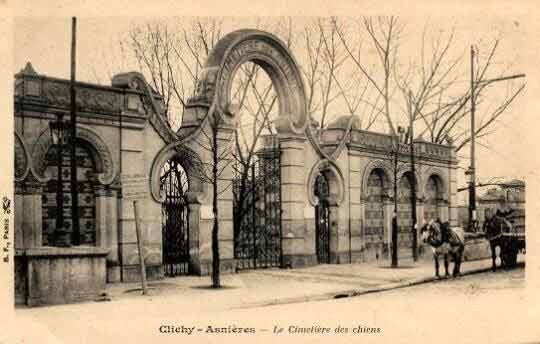
- Interactive map of Cimetière des Chiens et Autres Animaux Domestiques

Details
- Established: 1899
- Location: Asnières-sur-Seine
- Country: France
- Type: Pet cemetery
- Style: Art Nouveau
- Owned by: city of Asnières
- Website: http://www.asnieres-sur-seine.fr/Tourisme-international/Patrimoine/Le-cimetiere-des-animaux

The Cimetière des Chiens et Autres Animaux Domestiques is often claimed to be the first zoological necropolis in the modern world. The ancient Ashkelon dog cemetery predates it by thousands of years. It opened in 1899 at 4 pont de Clichy on Île des Ravageurs in Asnières-sur-Seine, Île-de-France.

== History ==
The "Cemetery of Dogs and Other Domestic Animals" is an elaborate pet cemetery, the burial site for dogs, cats, and a wide variety of pets ranging from horses to monkeys to lions and even fish. Located in a northwest suburb of Paris, the pet cemetery caters to a very elite clientele. It contains many ornate sculptures, and at the entry is the monument to Barry, a Saint Bernard mountain rescue dog who died in 1814. The plaque says that during his lifetime, "Barry" was responsible for saving the lives of 40 people lost or trapped in the mountain snow. (Barry himself is not buried at the cemetery; his preserved body is on display at the Swiss Natural History Museum in Bern.)

Some of the cemetery's residents are famous in their own right such as Rin Tin Tin, the star of Hollywood films following his rescue during World War I, while others are the beloved pets of the wealthy who could afford this elaborate burial place such as film director Sacha Guitry. Buried here too, is the pet lion of stage actress, feminist, and co-founder of the cemetery, Marguerite Durand and the pet of Camille Saint-Saëns, composer of Carnival of the Animals.

In 1987, the government of France classified the cemetery as an historical monument. The cemetery presently is owned and managed by the city of Asnières and is open to visitors.

The impressive entrance to the cemetery was designed by noted architect Eugène Petit in Art Nouveau style.

In 1910, the gates of the cemetery were reproduced in the city of Curitiba, Brazil, for the entrance of its first urban park, Passeio Público. The reference is indicated on bronze plates next to the construction.
