= World Spider Catalog =

Online taxonomic database

- Website type: Database
- Available in: English
- Owner: Natural History Museum of Bern (Naturhistorisches Museum Bern)
- Website: wsc.nmbe.ch
- Launched: June 2000 (text pages); January 2015 (database)
- Current status: 26

The World Spider Catalog (WSC) is an online searchable database concerned with spider taxonomy. It aims to list all accepted families, genera and species, as well as provide access to the related taxonomic literature.

The WSC began as a series of web pages in 2000, created by Norman I. Platnick of the American Museum of Natural History. After his retirement in 2014, the Natural History Museum of Bern took over, converting the catalog to a relational database. As of January 10, 2026, 53,656 species are listed, after an average discovery rate of three new species per day.

The order Araneae has the seventh-most species of all orders. The WSC's existence makes spiders the largest taxon with an online listing that is updated regularly. It has been described as an "exhaustive resource" that has "promoted rigorous scholarship and amplified productivity" in the taxonomy of spiders.
