= Bernard of Menthon =

Roman Catholic saint

Saint Bernard of Menthon CRSA
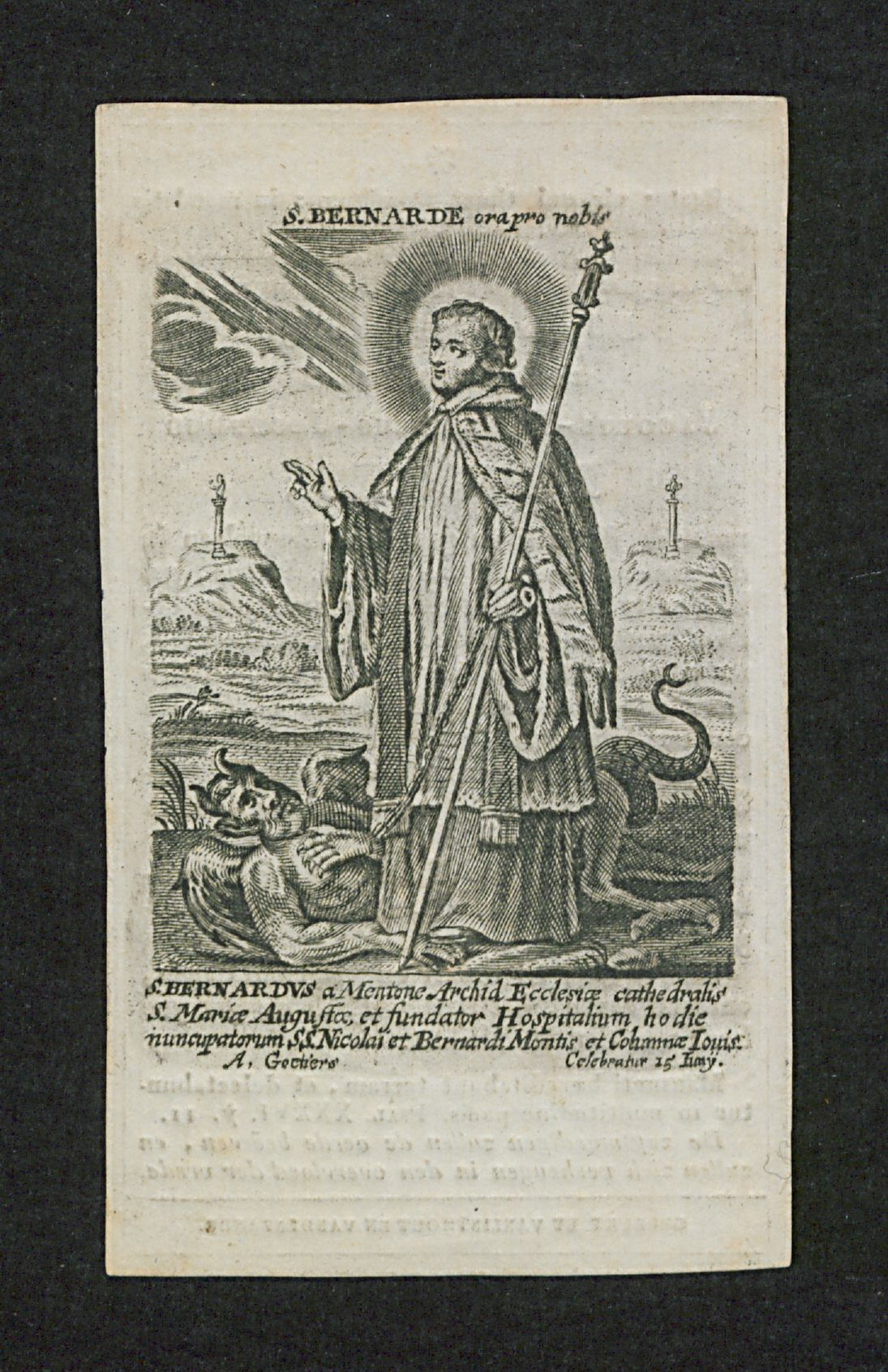
- Born: c. 923; Kingdom of Italy
- Died: 1008; Imperial Free City of Novara, Holy Roman Empire
- Venerated in: Catholic Church, Eastern Orthodox Church
- Canonized: 1681, Rome, Papal States by Pope Innocent XI
- Feast: May 28, June 15
- Attributes: In the mountains, with a dog
- Patronage: Mountaineers, skiing, snowboarding, backpacking and the Alps

Saint Bernard of Menthon or Bernard of Aosta or Saint Bernard of Montjoux was a Catholic priest and founder of the Great St Bernard Hospice, as well as its associated Canons Regular of the Hospitaller Congregation of Great Saint Bernard.

== Life ==
=== Early life ===
Bernard was likely born in Italy, born in the year 923.

In popular legend later disputed it is said that he was born in the Château de Menthon, near Annecy, then in the County of Savoy, a part of the Kingdom of Burgundy. He was descended from a rich and noble family and received a thorough education in Paris. When he had reached adulthood, he decided to devote himself to the service of the Church and refused an honorable marriage proposed by his father. It is said that he had to sneak out of the castle on the night before an arranged wedding, and that during his flight from the castle, he threw himself from his window, only to be caught by angels and lowered gently to the ground 40 feet (12 meters) below.

== Priesthood ==
Placing himself under the direction of Peter, the Archdeacon of Aosta, under whose guidance he rapidly progressed, Bernard was ordained a priest and worked as a missionary in the mountain villages. Later, on account of his learning and virtue, he was appointed to succeed his mentor as archdeacon of the cathedral, giving him charge of the government of the diocese, directly under the bishop.

For 42 years, he continued to preach the Gospel to these people and even into many cantons of Lombardy, effecting numerous conversions and working many miracles. The last act of Saint Bernard's life was the reconciliation of two noblemen whose strife threatened a fatal outcome. He died in 1008 in the Imperial Free City of Novara and was interred in the monastery of St. Lawrence.

== St Bernard's Passes ==
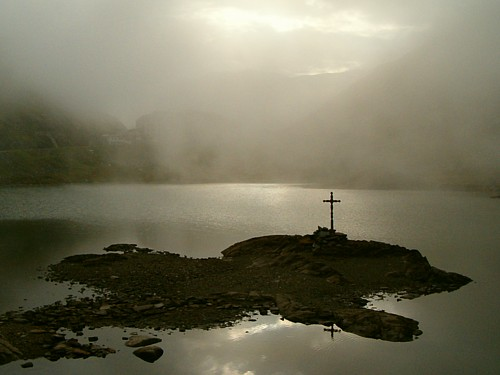
Great St Bernard Pass, 2469 m, August 2003

Since ancient times, there has been a path across the Pennine Alps leading from the Aosta Valley to the Swiss canton of Valais. The traditional route of this pass is covered with perpetual snow from seven to eight feet deep, and drifts sometimes accumulate to the height of forty feet. Although the pass was extremely dangerous, especially in the springtime on account of avalanches, it was often used by French and German pilgrims on their way to Rome.

In his office as archdeacon, Bernard had the charge of caring for the poor and travellers. For their convenience and protection, Bernard founded a canonry and hostel at the highest point of the pass, 8,000 feet above sea-level, at the site which has come to bear his name. A few years later he established another hostel on the Little St Bernard Pass, a mountain saddle in the Graian Alps, 7,076 feet above sea-level. Both were placed in charge of communities of canons regular, after papal approval had been obtained by Bernard during a visit to Rome. The new community was placed under the patronage of Nicholas of Myra, patron saint of travellers.

Today the Great St Bernard Tunnel and modern technology have reduced the need for rescue operations at the pass. The dogs were put up for sale in 2004 because of the high cost of maintenance, and were promptly bought by foundations created for the purpose.

== Legacy ==
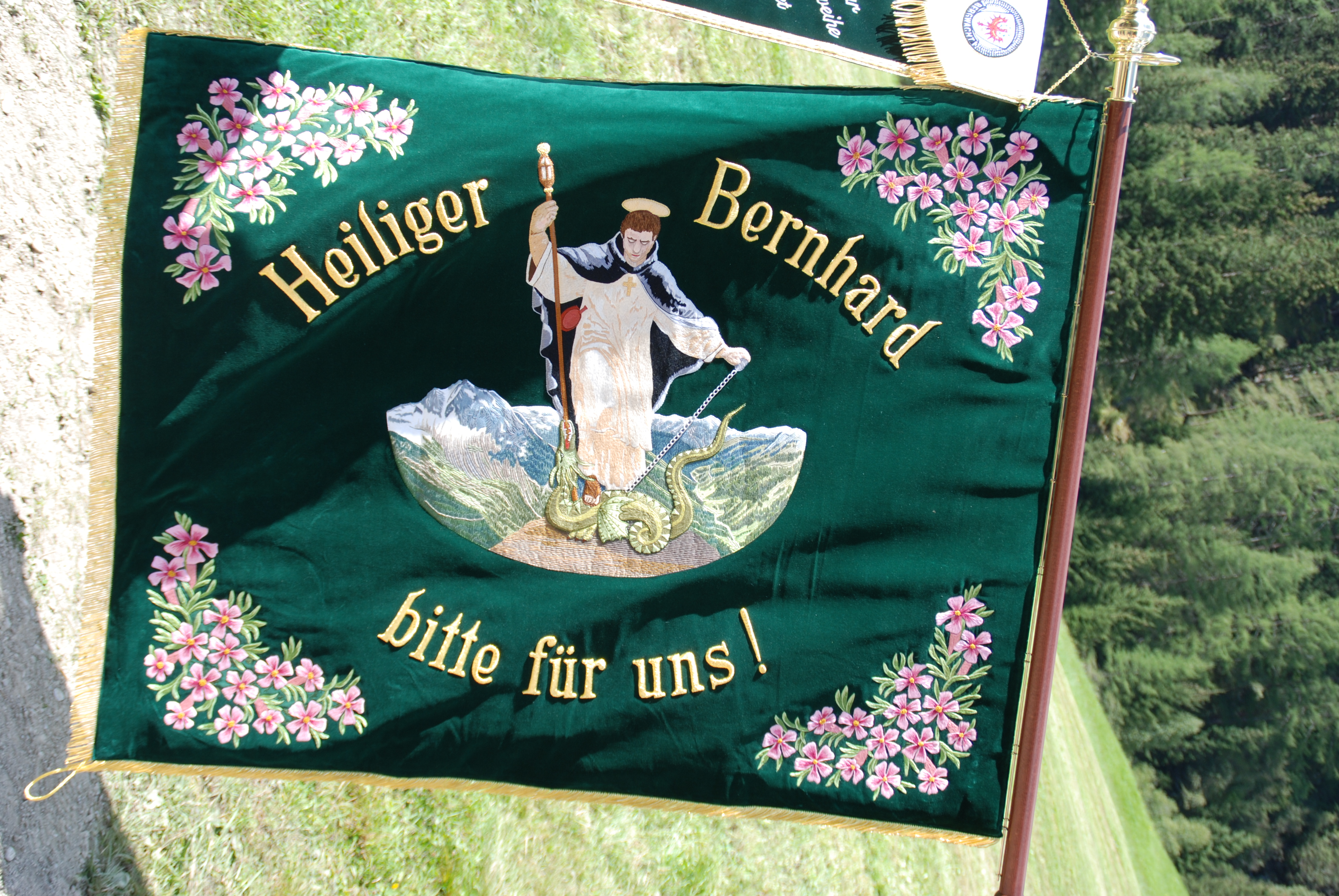
Saint Bernard on the flag of the Tyrolean Alpine Guard, detachment Villgraten Valley

These hostels were renowned for the generous hospitality extended to all travellers over the Great and Little St Bernard, so called in honour of the founder of these charitable institutions. At all seasons of the year, but especially during heavy snow-storms, the canons, later accompanied by their well-trained dogs, the common herding dogs of Valais ("St Bernards" are attested from the 17th century), went out in search of victims who might have succumbed to the severity of the weather. They offered food, clothing and shelter to the unfortunate travelers and took care of the dead. They depended on gifts and collections for sustenance.

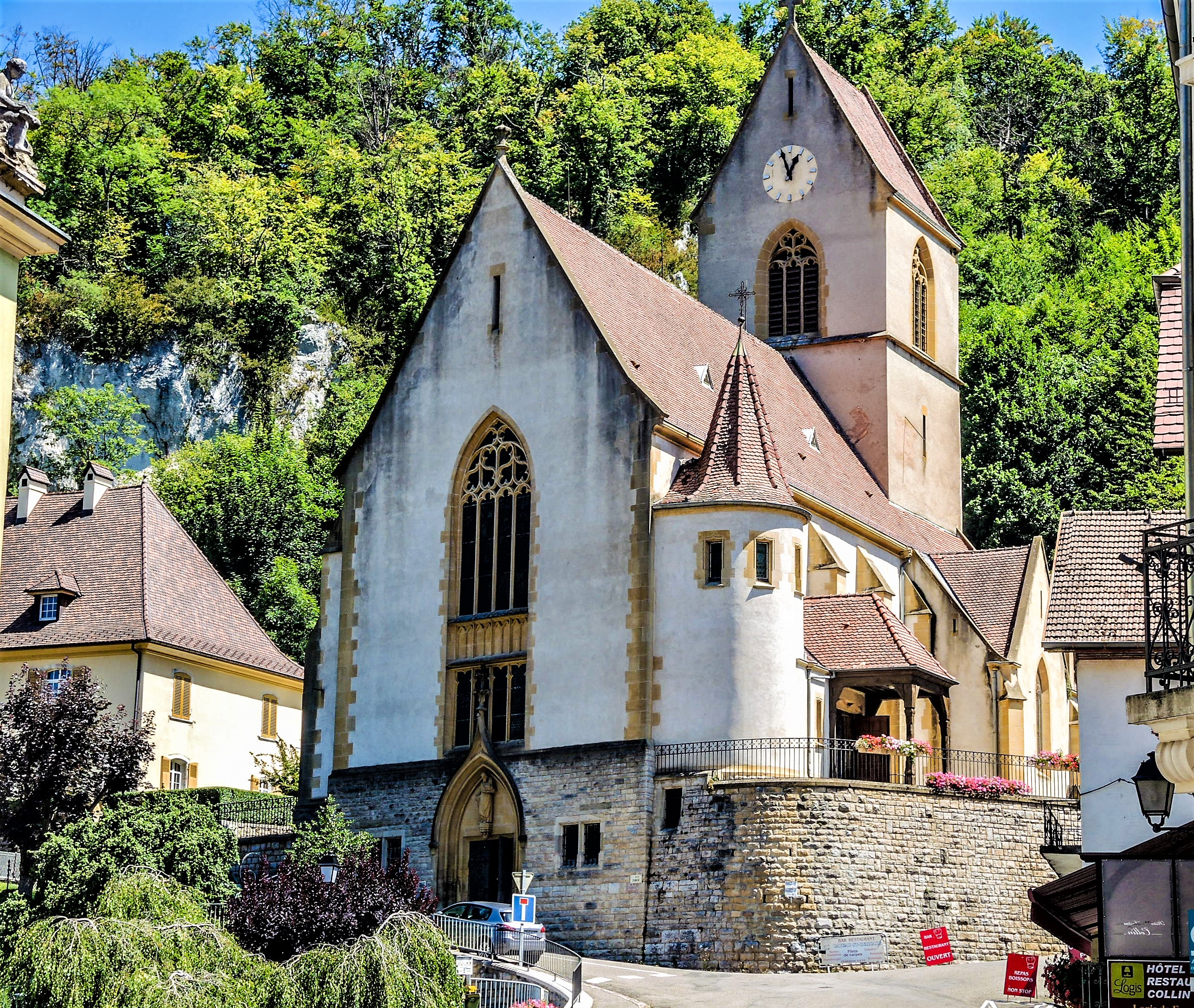
Église Saint-Bernard de Menthon in Ferrette, Alsace

As of 2012 the congregation consisted of around 35 professed members, the majority of whom live at the hostel while some provide pastoral care to neighbouring parishes. St Bernard dogs are still on the site as pets and to entertain tourists; helicopters are used in rescue operations today.

== Veneration ==
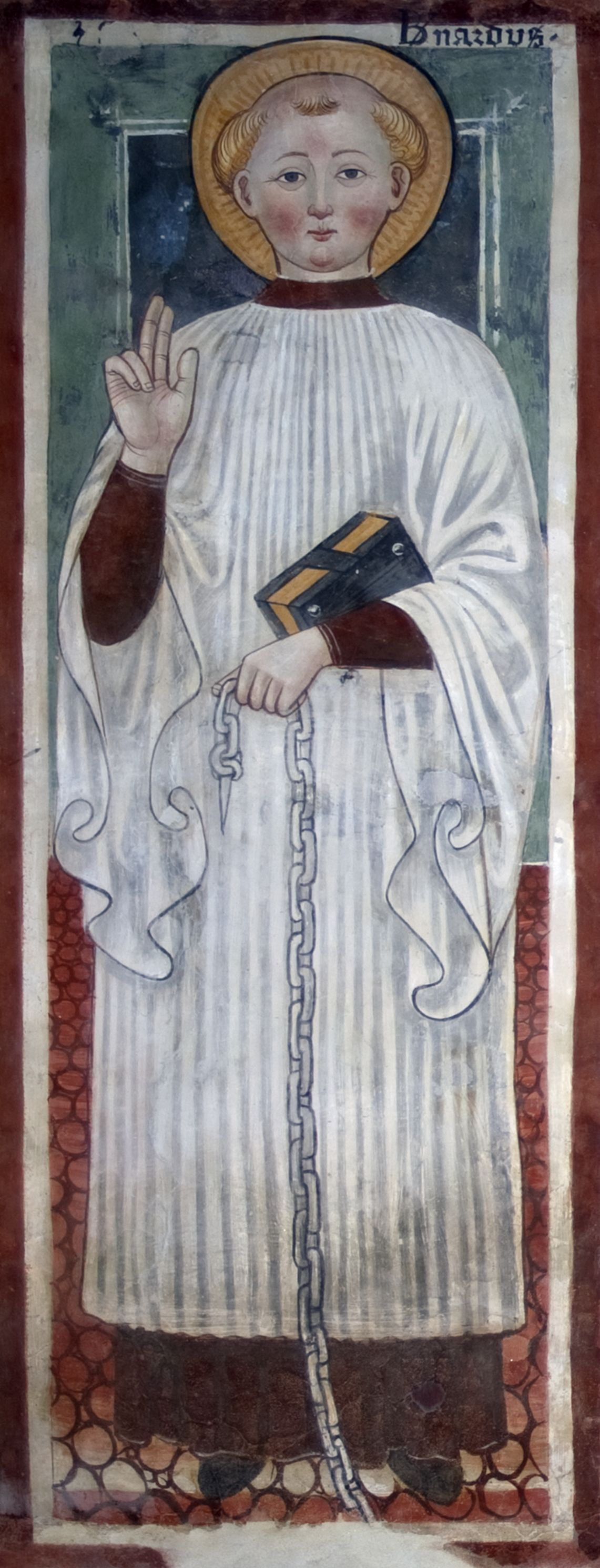
Fresco at Oratorio di Santa Maria, Garbagna Novarese (Italy), late 15th century

Although venerated from the 11th century in such places of northern Italy as Aosta, Novara and Brescia, Bernard was canonised only in 1681 by Pope Innocent XI. His feast is celebrated on 28 May or June 15 (Roman Martyrology date given for his burial). Pope Pius XI confirmed Bernard as the patron saint of the Alps in 1923. His image appears in the flag of some detachments of the Tyrolean Alpine Guard. He is also the patron saint of skiing, snowboarding, hiking, backpacking, and mountaineering.

Saint Bernard's Catholic Church in Saranac Lake, New York and St. Bernard's Catholic Church and school in New Washington, Ohio are named for him.

Conflicting dates are given for when Saint Bernard lived and died. Alban Butler in his Lives of the Saints book series as well as the Catholic Encyclopedia have the birth year being 923 and his death year being 1008. Many traditional sources repeat these dates, with some variations.

== See also ==
- Saint Bernard of Menthon, patron saint archive
