= St. Bernard (dog breed) =

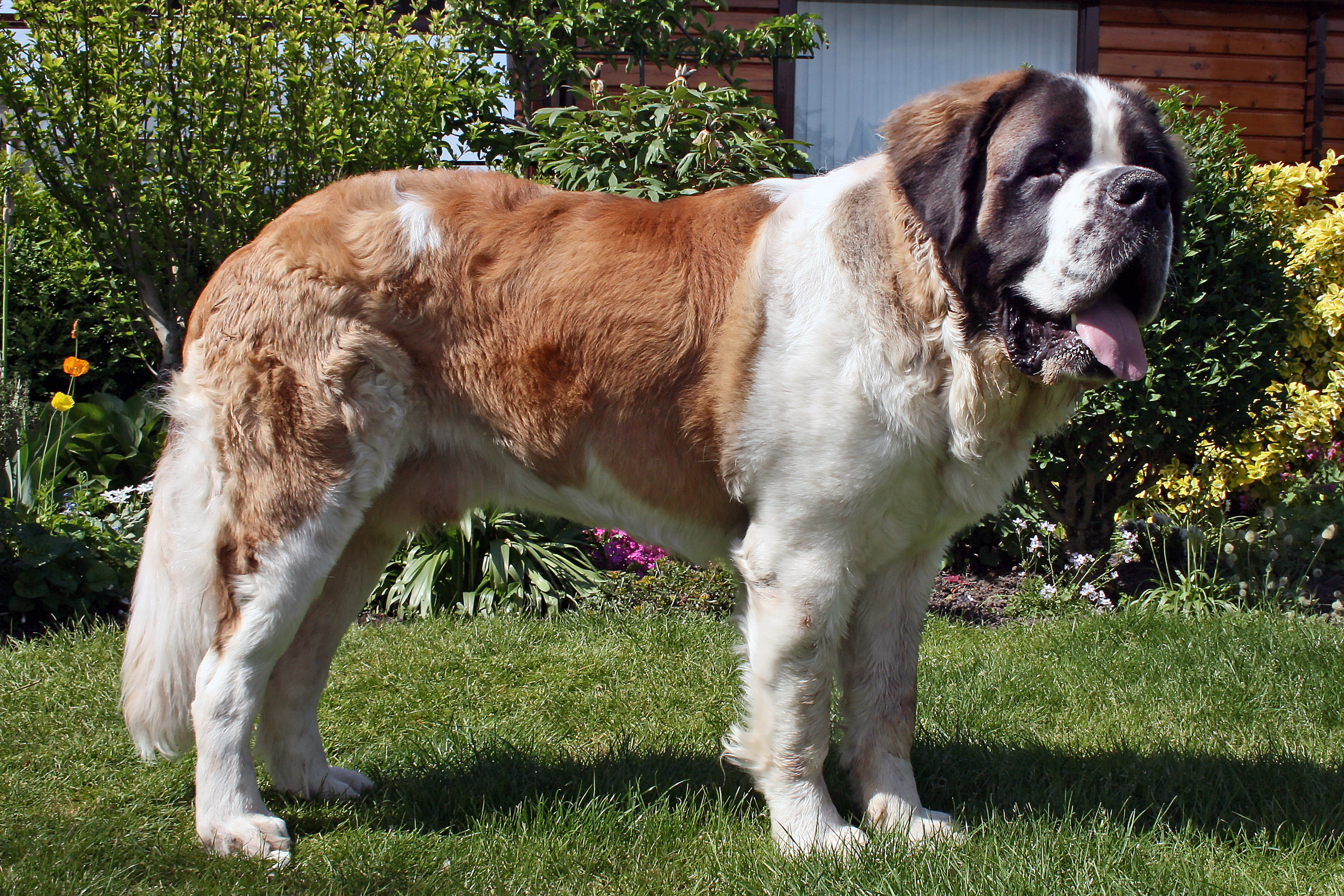
- Saint Bernard, male, longhaired, 14 months old
- Other names: Saint Bernhardog; St. Bernhardshund; Bernhardiner; Alpine Spaniel
- Common nicknames: Saint
- Origin: Switzerland
Traits
Height	Males	70 to 90 cm (28 to 35 in)
	Females	65 to 80 cm (26 to 31 in)
Weight	Males	64 to 82 kg (140 to 180 lb)
	Females	54 to 64 kg (120 to 140 lb)
Kennel club standards
- Fédération Cynologique Internationale: standard

The St. Bernard or Saint Bernard (UK: /ˈbɜːrnərd/, US: /bərˈnɑːrd/) is a breed of very large working dog from the Western Alps; they were originally bred for rescue work by the hospice of the Great St Bernard Pass on the Italian-Swiss border, with Switzerland recognized as its country of origin by the FCI. The hospice, built by and named after the Alpine monk Saint Bernard of Menthon, acquired its first dogs between 1660 and 1670. The breed has become famous through tales of Alpine rescues, as well as for its large size and gentle temperament.

== Description ==
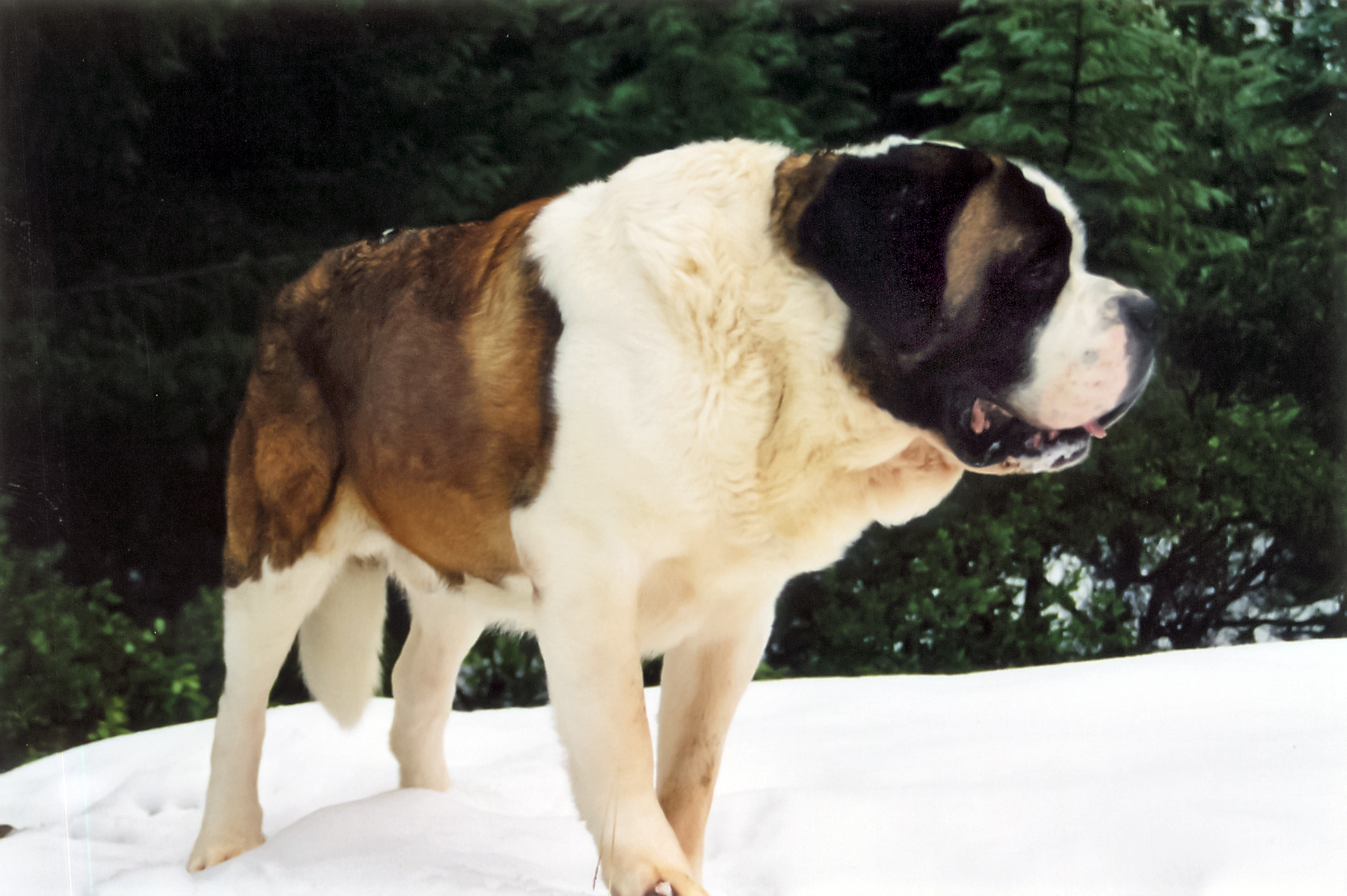
Longhaired St. Bernard

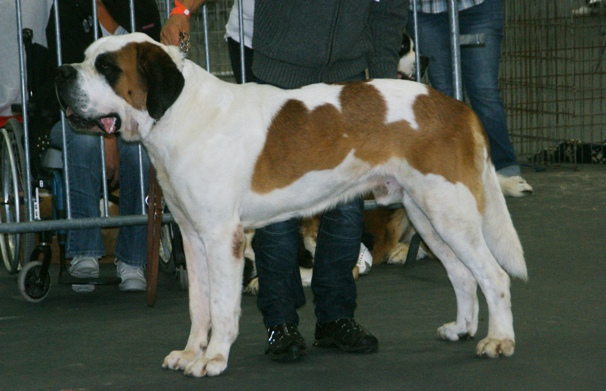
Shorthaired St. Bernard

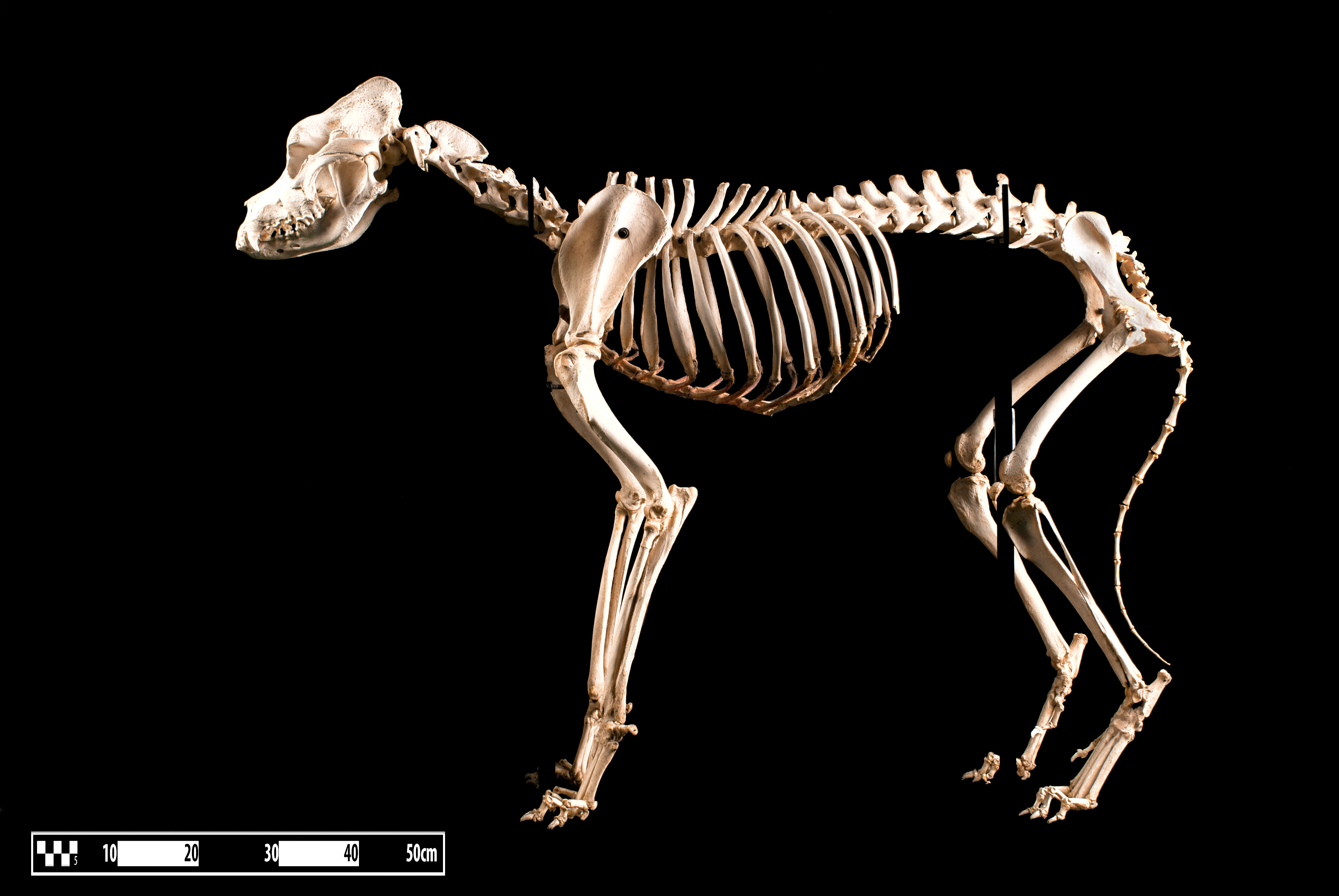
St. Bernard skeleton

The St. Bernard is recognized internationally today as one of the molosser breeds. It is a giant dog. The coat is smooth being close and flat. The colour is primarily white with smaller or larger red patches with a clear to dark red mantle and reddish-brown mantle being the most 'valuable'. A brindle reddish colour and brownish-yellow colour are both allowed but less desirable. The tail is long and heavy, hanging high. The eye colour ranges from light brown to dark brown and should have naturally tight lids, with haws only slightly visible.

== History of the St. Bernard ==
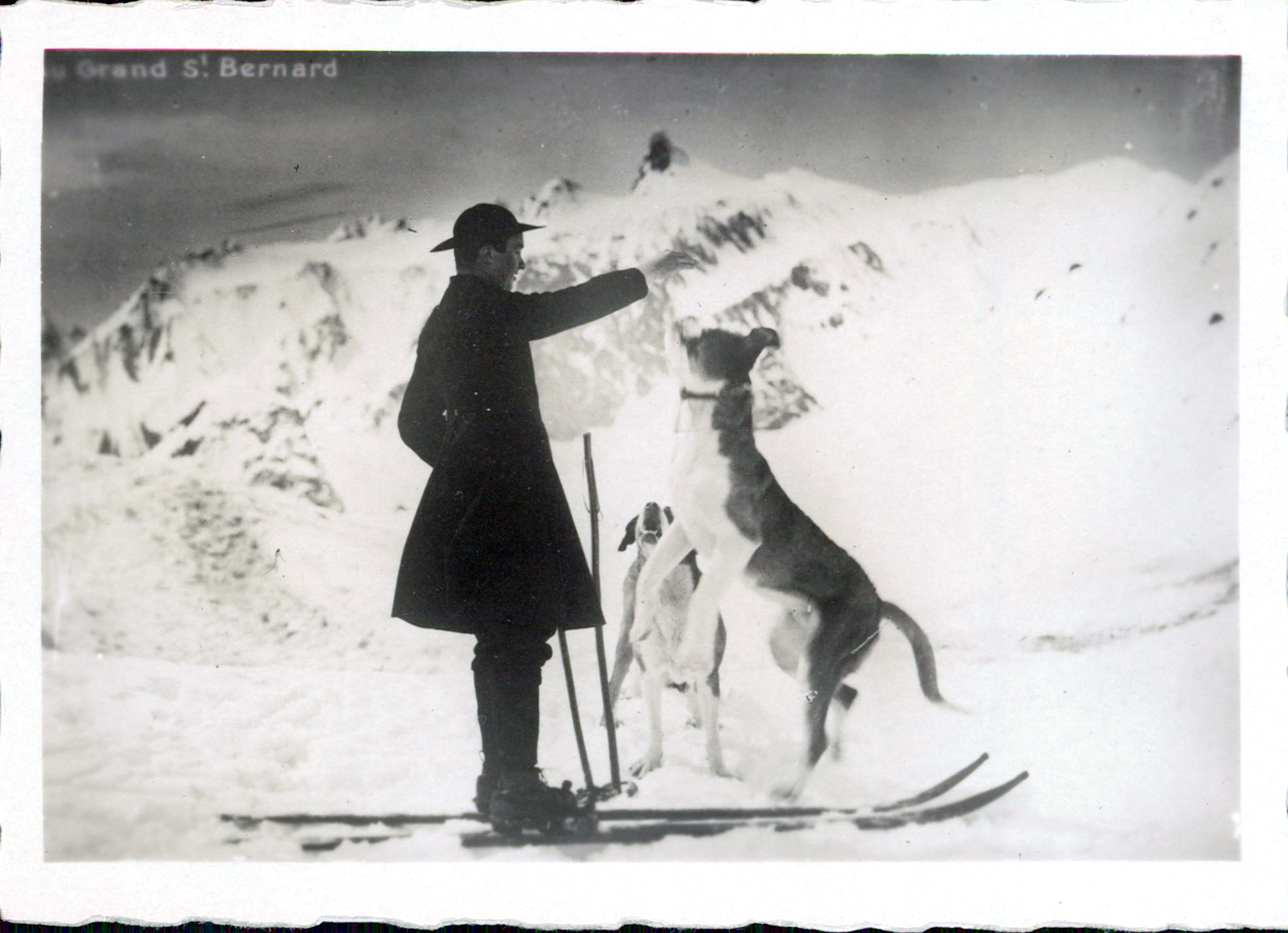
A St. Bernard in use as an avalanche dog (1929)

The earliest written records of the St. Bernard are from monks at the Great St Bernard Hospice at the Great St Bernard Pass in 1707, with paintings and drawings of the dog dating even earlier. Early British accounts of the breed described the breed as the Alpine Spaniel. The first evidence that the dogs were in use at the monastery is in two paintings dating to 1690 by Italian artist Salvator Rosa. The most famous St. Bernard to save people at the pass was Barry (sometimes spelled Berry), who reportedly saved somewhere between 40 and 100 lives. There is a monument to Barry in the Cimetière des Chiens, and his body was preserved in the Natural History Museum in Bern.

Another famous dog was Rutor, the faithful companion of the Italian priest Pierre Chanoux, named after the peak Tête du Rutor located above the Little St. Bernard pass. The classic St. Bernard looked very different from the St. Bernard of today because of crossbreeding. Severe winters from 1816 to 1818 led to increased numbers of avalanches, killing many of the dogs used for breeding while they were performing rescues. In an attempt to preserve the breed, the remaining St. Bernards were crossed with Newfoundlands brought from the Colony of Newfoundland in the 1850s, as well as with other breeds. This led to a significant change in their appearance and abilities. The long fur they inherited would freeze in the snowy climate of the Alps, weighing them down and reducing their effectiveness as rescue dogs.

The dogs never received any special training from the monks. Instead, younger dogs would learn how to perform search and rescue operations from older dogs.

The Swiss St. Bernard Club was founded in Basel on 15 March 1884. The St. Bernard was the first breed entered into the Swiss Stud Book in 1884, and the breed standard was finally approved in 1888. Since then, the breed has been a Swiss national dog.

During World War I St. Bernard dogs assisted the Red Cross and were used to carry supplies to troops in the Italian mountains, stationed in places inaccessible to mules and horses.

The dogs at the Great St Bernard Hospice were working dogs that were smaller than today's show St. Bernards. Originally about the size of a German Shepherd Dog, the St. Bernard grew to the size of today's dog as kennel clubs and dog shows emphasized appearance over the dog's working ability, along with a closed stud book.

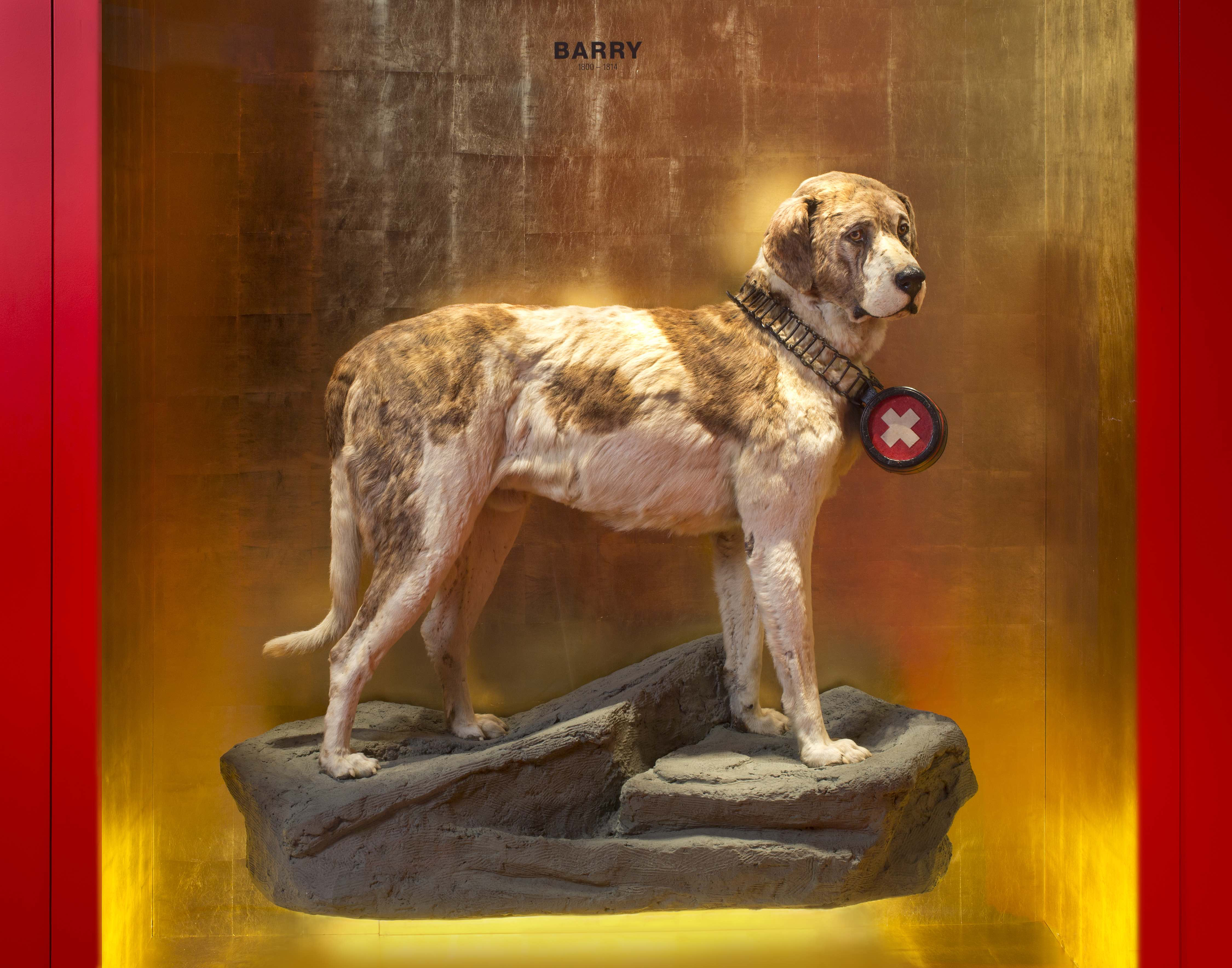
Barry's taxidermied body. Although the skull shape was changed in the 1920s, his body demonstrates the original St. Bernard proportions

St. Bernards are no longer used for Alpine rescues, the last recorded instance of which was in 1955. As late as 2004, the Great St Bernard Hospice still retained 18 of the dogs for reasons of tradition and sentiment. An annual celebration of the breed takes place on the Little Saint Bernard Pass and at the town of Rosières-Montvalzan on the French side. St. Bernard enthusiasts and breeders gather for a dog show and parades.

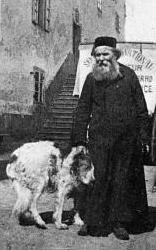
Italian priest Pierre Chanoux and his faithful St. Bernard, Rutor

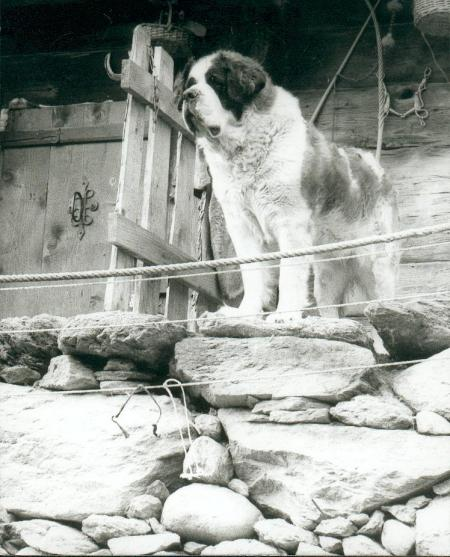
A St. Bernard rescue dog in Valais

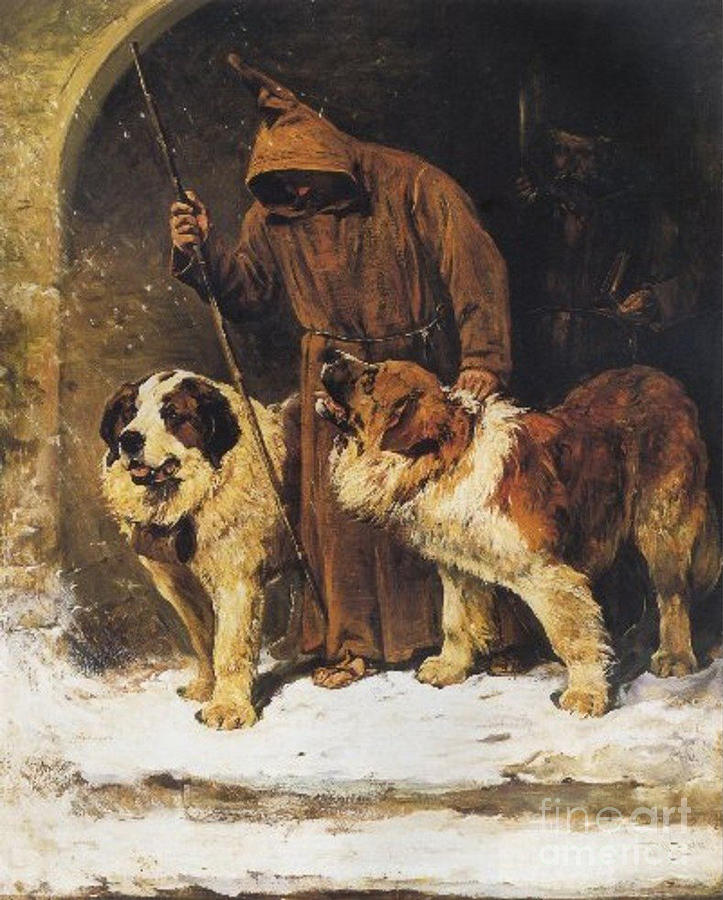
A painting by John Emms portraying St. Bernards as rescue dogs

=== Naming ===
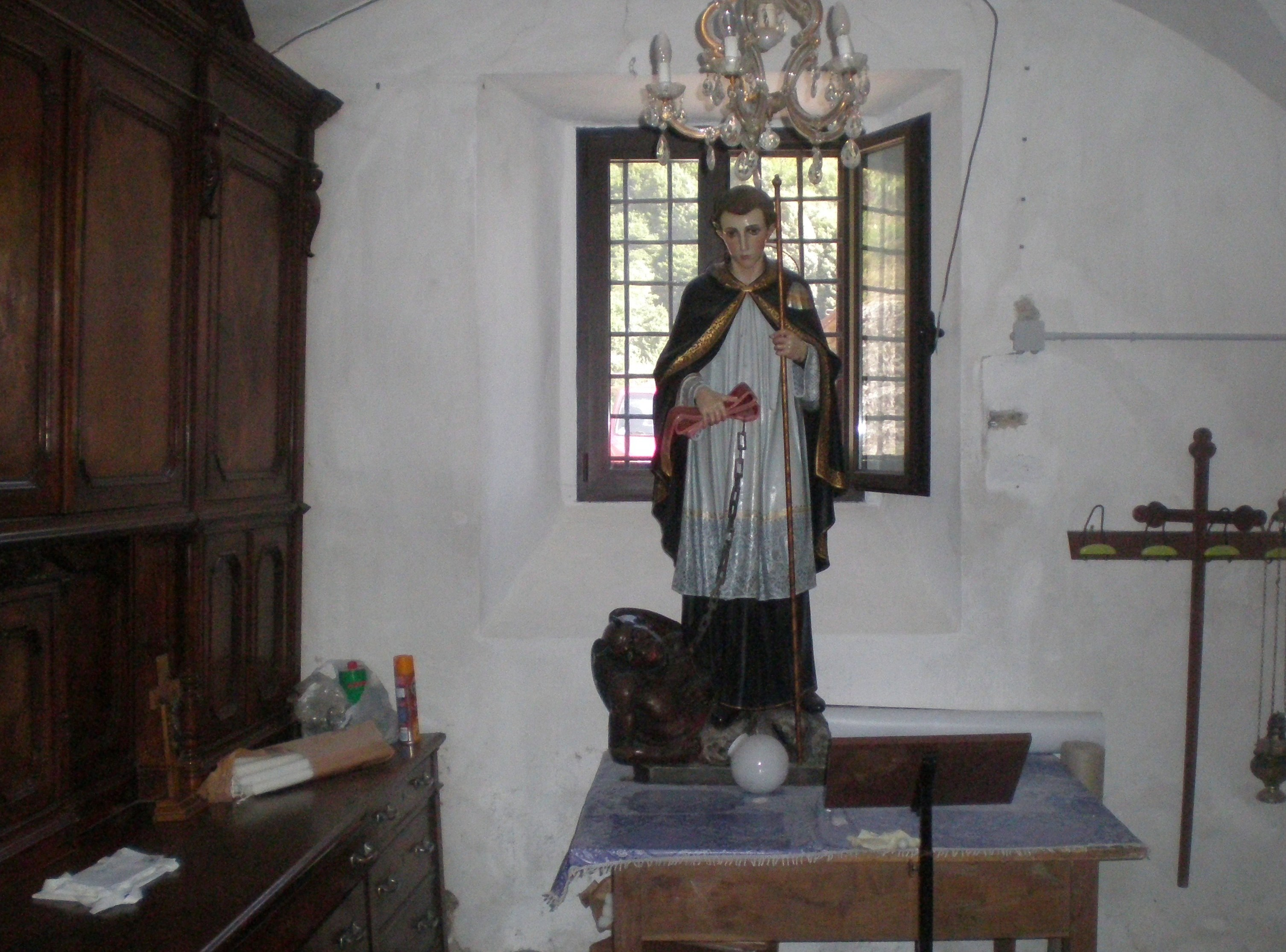
A statue of Bernard of Menthon in Ascona (Genoa), Italy

The name "St. Bernard" originates from the Great St Bernard Hospice, a traveler's hospice on the often treacherous Great St Bernard Pass in the Western Alps, between Switzerland and Italy. The pass, the lodge, and the dogs are named for Bernard of Menthon, the 11th century Italian monk who established the station.

"St. Bernard" was not in widespread use until the middle of the 19th century. The dogs were called "Saint Dogs", "Noble Steeds", or "Barry Dogs" before that time.

=== Related breeds ===
The breed is strikingly similar to the English Mastiff. The modern St. Bernard is radically different from the original dogs kept at the Great St Bernard Hospice, most notably by being much larger in size and build. Since the late 1800s, the St. Bernard breed has been ever refined, using many different large molosser-type breeds, including the Newfoundland, Great Pyrenees, Greater Swiss Mountain Dog, Great Dane, English Mastiff, and possibly the Tibetan Mastiff and Caucasian Shepherd Dog. It is suspected that many of these large breeds were used to redevelop each other to combat the threat of their extinction after World War II, which may explain why all of them played a part in the creation of the St. Bernard as it is seen today.

The four Sennenhund (Swiss mountain dog) breeds, the Grosser Schweizer Sennenhund (Greater Swiss Mountain Dog), the Berner Sennenhund (Bernese Mountain Dog), the Appenzeller Sennenhund (Appenzeller Mountain Dog), and the Entlebucher Sennenhund (Entlebucher Mountain Dog), are similar in appearance to the St. Bernard and share the same location of origin and history, but are tricolour (black, tan and white) rather than red and white or mahogany brindle and white, as the St. Bernand is.

The Russian army kennels crossbred St. Bernards with Caucasian Shepherd Dogs to produce the Moscow Watchdogs that are still used as military service dogs in Russia today. St. Bernards have in common many characteristics of livestock guardian dog breeds.

=== Kennel Club recognition ===
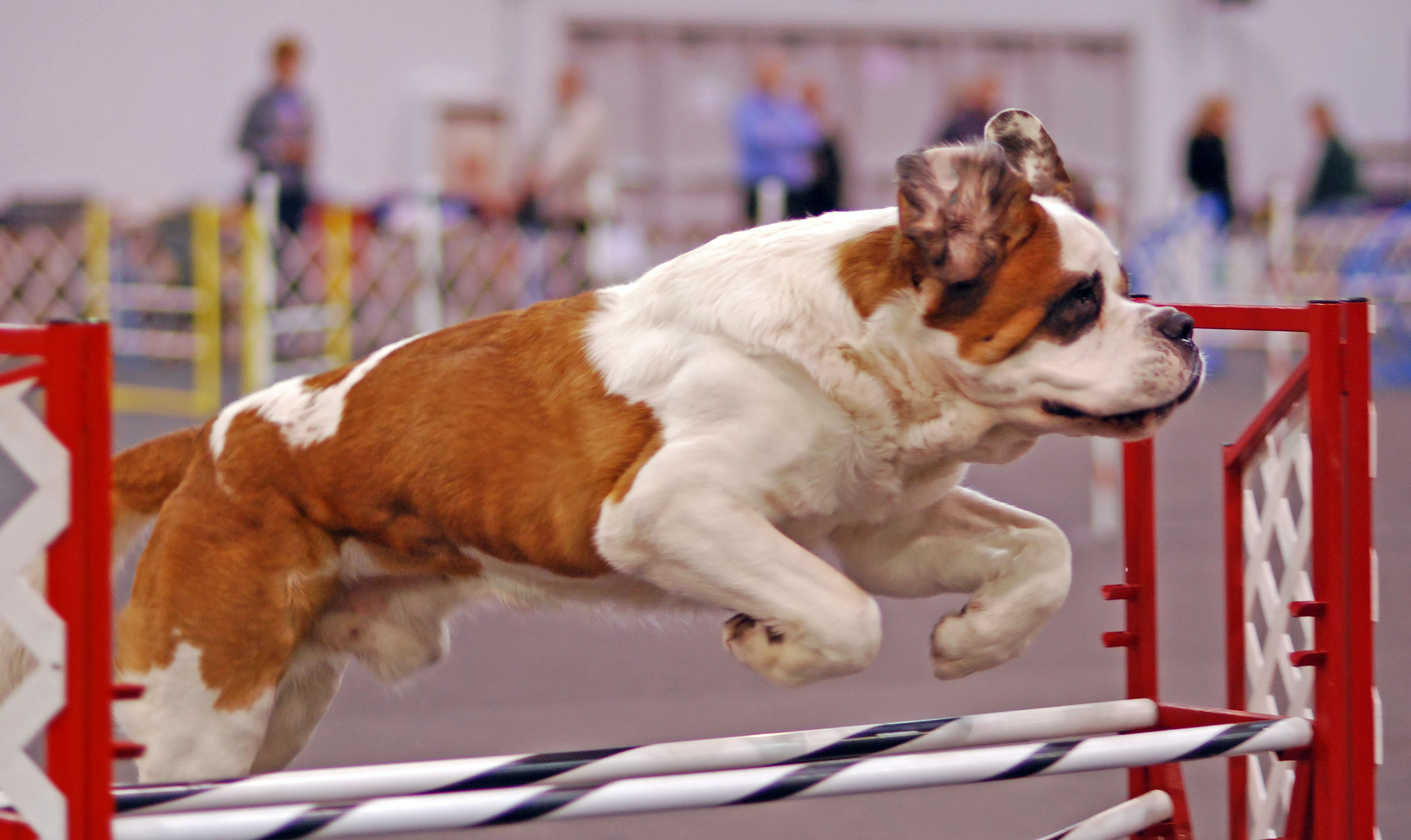
St. Bernard performing agility at the Rose City Classic AKC Show 2007, Portland, Oregon, US

The St. Bernard is recognised internationally by the Fédération Cynologique Internationale as a Molosser in Group 2, Section 2. The breed is recognised by The Kennel Club (UK), the Canadian Kennel Club, and the American Kennel Club in the Working Dog group. The United Kennel Club in the United States places the breed in the Guardian Dog Group. The New Zealand Kennel Club and the Australian National Kennel Council place the breed in the Utility Group

== Health ==
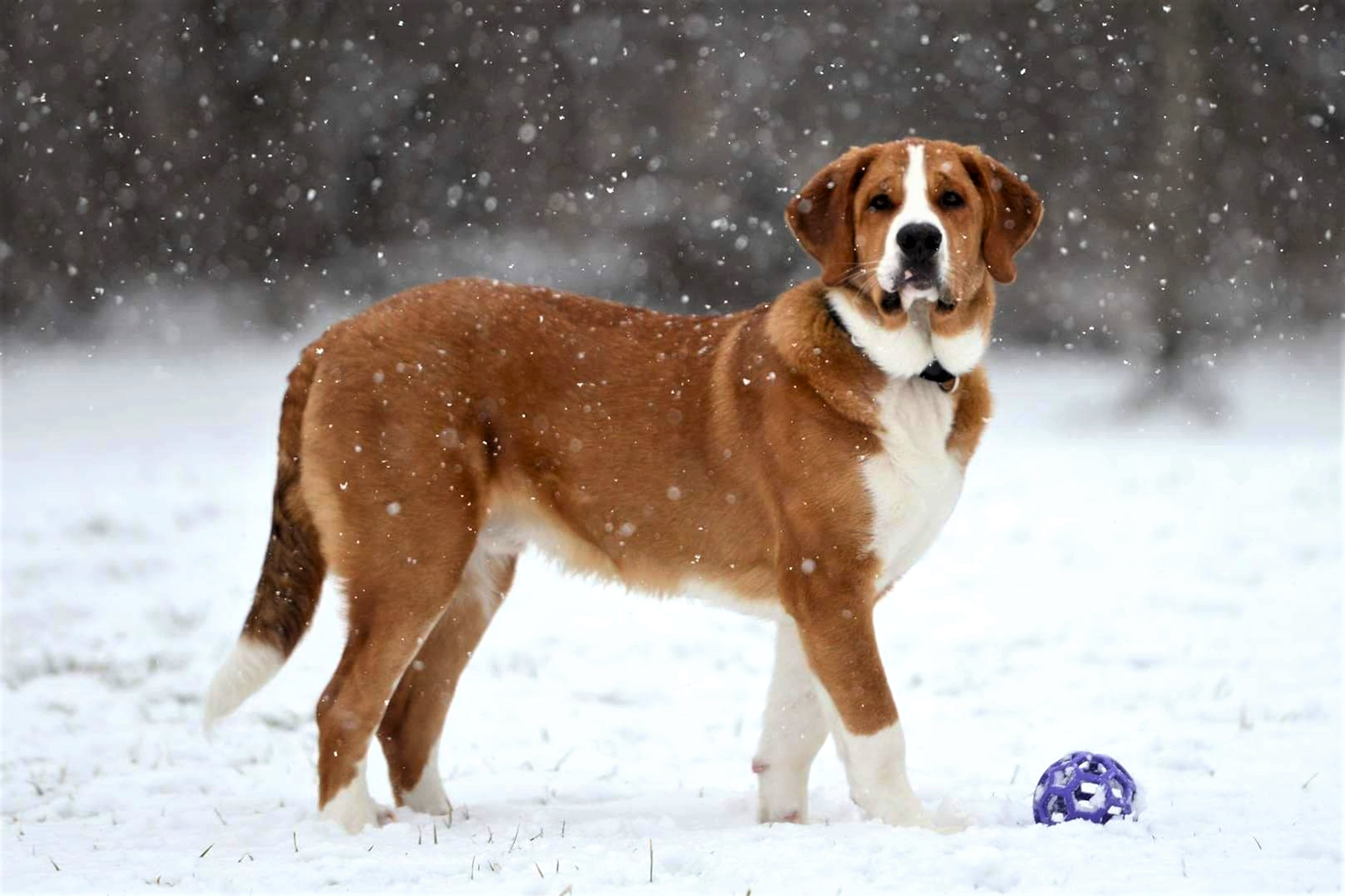
Young St. Bernard playing in the snow

A 2024 UK study found a life expectancy of 9.3 years for the breed compared to an average of 12.7 for purebreeds and 12 for crossbreeds. A 2005 Swedish study of insurance data found 74% of St Bernards died by the age of 10, higher than the overall rate of 35% of dogs dying by the age of 10.

Osteosarcoma (bone cancer) has been shown to be hereditary in the breed.

A study found a mutation in the gene ARHGEF10 to be highly associated with a juvenile-onset inherited polyneuropathy similar to Charcot-Marie-Tooth disease.

The Saint Bernard is predisposed to several skin conditions, these include: acral lick dermatitis, intertrigo, dermal arteritis, hygroma, and pyotraumatic dermatitis.

An American study of veterinary records found the Saint Bernard to be predisposed to dilated cardiomyopathy (DCM), with 2.6% of dogs having the condition compared to 0.2% for mixed-breeds. A study in England found 20 out of 369 cases of DCM to be Saint Bernards with 72% of those all presenting for atrial fibrillation.

An American study reviewing over a million cases presented to 27 veterinary teaching hospitals in North America found the Saint Bernard to be the second most predisposed to canine hip dysplasia with 14.70% of dogs having the condition compared to 3.52% overall. The Saint Bernard was also found to be predisposed towards canine cruciate ligament deficiency (CCLD) with 3.57% of dogs having the condition compared to 2.55% overall. The Saint Bernard had the third highest prevalence for dogs with both conditions at 1.19% compared to the overall rate of 0.3%.

A review of 1,934 cases of gastric dilatation volvulus (GDV) found the Saint Bernard to be greatly predisposed to the condition with an odds-ratio of 4.2. A health survey in the UK found 4.6% of dogs to have the condition and 15.1% of dogs to have died from the condition. A study in California found 3.76% of dogs presented had GDV.

== Temperament ==
The Saint Bernard is calm, patient, and good with adults and children alike. Usually it is a gentle, loyal, and friendly breed, and if socialized properly tends to work well with other dogs. While generally not instinctively protective, a St. Bernard may bark at strangers, and their size makes them deterrents against possible intruders.

The St. Bernard was bred to be a working companion. St. Bernards have retained their natural ability for scent work and depending on the skill of the trainer and the talents of the dog, they can participate in tracking events or even become involved in search and rescue work.

== Notability ==
=== In media ===
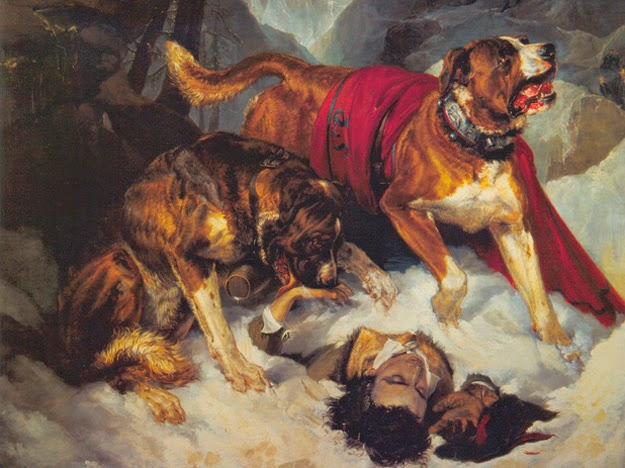
Alpine Mastiffs Reanimating a Distressed Traveller by Edwin Landseer (1820)

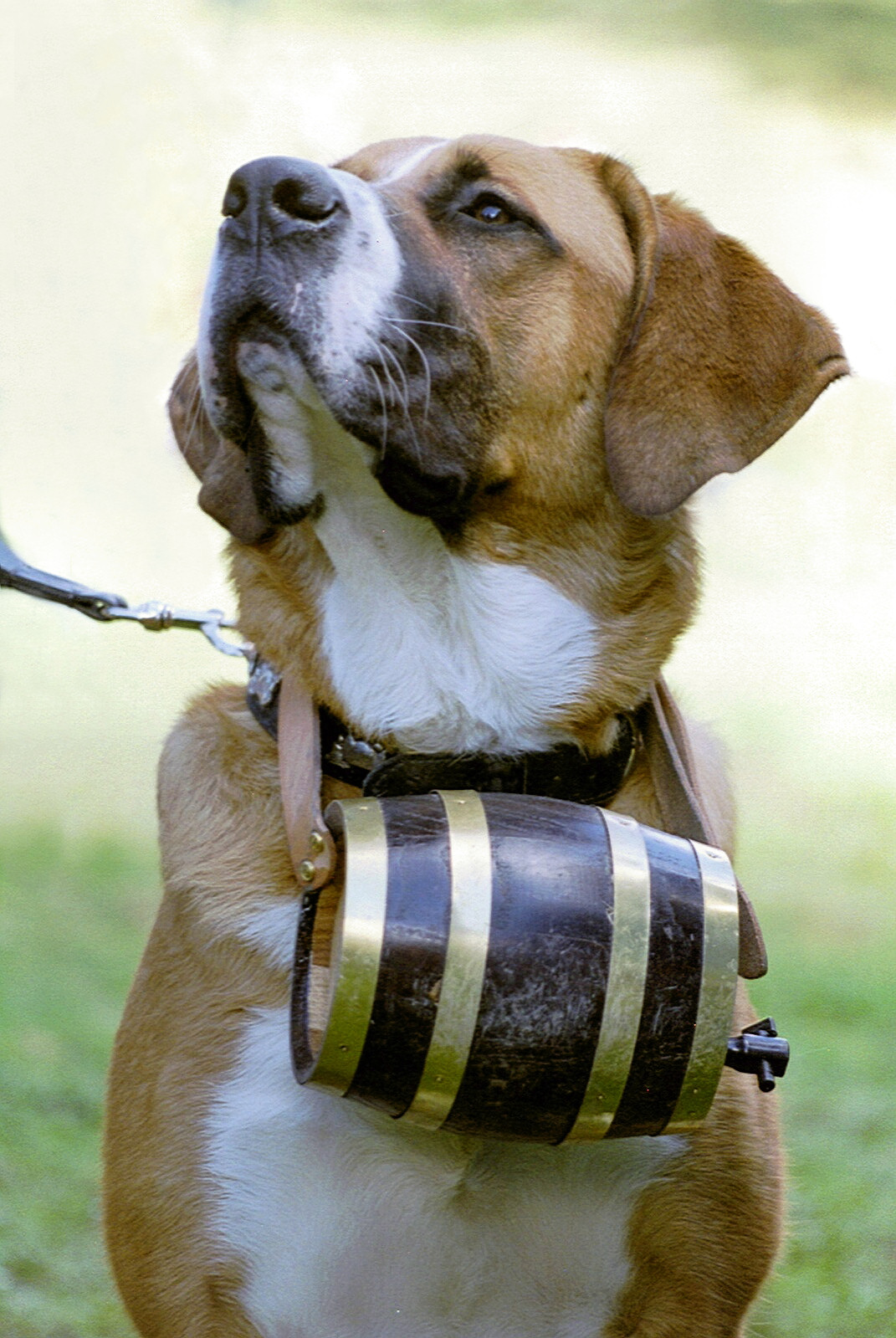
St. Bernard with the iconic barrel

St. Bernards are often portrayed, especially in old live action comedies such as Swiss Miss, the TV series Topper, and classic cartoons (such as the 1938 Merrie Melodies short "Cracked Ice"), wearing small barrels of brandy around their necks. Avalanche victims supposedly drank the brandy to stay warm while awaiting rescue, although this is medically unsound. The monks of the St. Bernard Hospice deny that any St. Bernard has ever carried casks or small barrels around their necks; they attribute the image to an 1820 painting by Edwin Landseer, Alpine Mastiffs Reanimating a Distressed Traveller (which became a popular engraving in 1831 by Charles Landseer). The monks did keep casks around for photographs by tourists.

There was apparently at least one dog that really did carry brandy. In The Percy Anecdotes, by Thomas Byerley, published in 1823, the following anecdote appears, and was often quoted in other books in the 19th century:

The breed of dogs kept by the monks to assist them ... has been long celebrated for its sagacity and fidelity. All the oldest and most tried of them were lately buried, along with some unfortunate travellers, under a valanche [sic]; but three or four hopeful puppies were left at home in the convent, and still survive. The most celebrated of those who are no more, was a dog called Barry. This animal served the hospital for the space of twelve years, during which time he saved the lives of forty individuals. His zeal was indefatigable. Whenever the mountain was enveloped in fogs and snow, he set out in search of lost travellers. He was accustomed to run barking until he lost breath, and would frequently venture on the most perilous places. When he found his strength was insufficient to draw from the snow a traveller benumbed with cold, he would run back to the hospital in search of the monks...

When old age deprived him of strength, the Prior of the Convent pensioned him at Berney, by way of reward. After his death, his hide was stuffed and deposited in the museum of that town. The little phial, in which he carried a reviving liquor for the distressed travellers whom he found among the mountains, is still suspended from his neck.

A Punch magazine cartoon from 1949 depicts a man with a St. Bernard and several puppies, all of which are wearing neck casks. The man explains, "Of course, I only breed them for the brandy."

A frequent joke in old MGM and Warner Brothers shorts is to depict the dogs as compulsive alcoholics who engage in frequent nips from their own casks.

=== Famous St. Bernards ===
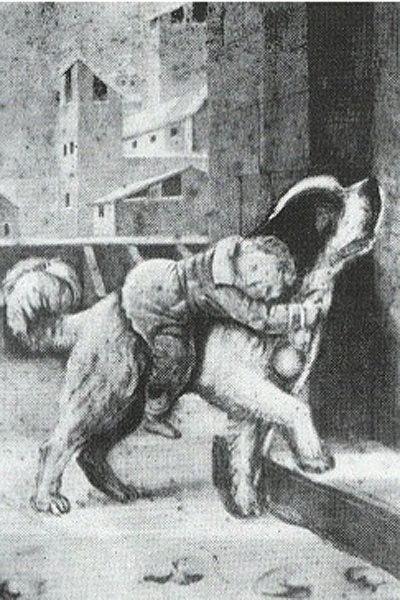
A drawing of Barry rescuing a small child

- Bachelor, Resident Dog, the Ritz-Carlton, Bachelor Gulch
- Burtonswood (Bossy Boots). English and Irish Crufts Supreme Champion (1974), breeder was the late Miss Marjorie Hinds
- Bamse, a Norwegian dog honoured for exploits during World War II on a memorial statue in Montrose, Scotland, where he died in 1944; also awarded the PDSA Gold Medal for animal bravery
- Barry, famous Alpine rescue dog
- Bernie, mascot of the Colorado Avalanche
- Bernie "Saint" Bernard, mascot of the saints in Dubuque
- Bernie, mascot of the Northampton Saints
- Gumbo, team mascot for the New Orleans Saints
- Porthos, J. M. Barrie's dog
- Schnorbitz, on-stage partner of British comedian Bernie Winters during his later career
- Schotzie and Schotzie "02", beloved pets and mascots of the Cincinnati Reds' owner
- Scipio, a St. Bernard owned by Orville Wright.
- Wallace (currently Wallace VI), mascot of the Canadian Scottish Regiment (Princess Mary's)

==== Fictional dogs ====
See generally: List of fictional dogs

- Barabbas, a St. Bernard in Walt Disney's 1969 film My Dog the Thief, accidentally takes a priceless necklace belonging to a gang of jewel smugglers, dragging his air-traffic reporter partner into a comedic adventure.
- Beethoven (from the film series of the same name) The 1992 comedy film Beethoven features a friendly but troublesome 185-pound (80 kg) longhaired St. Bernard and, in later sequels, his mate and their brood of unruly pups. According to the producers of the sequel Beethoven's 2nd, the St. Bernards used in the film grew so fast during filming that over 100 St. Bernard puppies were cast to portray the sequel's four puppies (Tchaikovsky, Chubby, Dolly, and Mo) and their mother (Missy).
- Bolivar a.k.a. Bornworthy and Bernie, Donald Duck's non-anthropomorphic pet, and his son Behemoth.
- Buck, from Jack London's 1903 novel, The Call of the Wild, is described as half St. Bernard and half "Scotch shepherd dog", (Note: Buck in The Call of the Wild is described thus: "His (Buck's) father, Elmo, a huge St Bernard, had been the Judge's inseparable companion, and Buck bid fair to follow in the way of his father. He was not so large,— he weighed only one hundred and forty pounds [64 kg],— for his mother, Shep, had been a Scotch shepherd dog. Nevertheless, one hundred and forty pounds [64 kg], to which was added the dignity that comes of good living and universal respect, enabled him to carry himself in right royal fashion." The Call of the Wild (novel).) (Note: The term "Scotch shepherd dog" is an archaic Victorian phrase which probably refers to the Scotch Collie, or the Old Time Farm Shepherd, but might also refer to the English Shepherd. "Name That Breed – A Collie By Any Other Name…". Old-Time Farm Shepherd. Ward, Andy (28 October 2009). "Defining a Breed: An Apologia of the OTFS". Old-Time Farm Shepherd.) but was rendered as a full St. Bernard in at least one of the six movie versions. (Note: A St. Bernard was used in the Clark Gable version, The Call of the Wild (1935). Three Leonberger 'actors' (one was a female, two were males) played the starring dog "Buck" in The Call of the Wild: Dog of the Yukon (1997), "Call of the Wild - Dog of the Yukon". Internet Movie Database. 22 June 1997. a Canadian rendition of Jack London's The Call of the Wild starring Rutger Hauer as John Thornton (narrated by Richard Dreyfuss)."Leonberger Facts". American Kennel Club. Nevertheless, films and television renditions have varied the dog breed. The book was also adapted in The Call of the Wild by D. W. Griffith (1908); a second silent film (1923) by Hal Roach; The Call of the Wild (1972) and Call of the Wild 3D (2009). It has also been the subject of three television programs or films: The Call of the Wild, a 1976 American TV film starring John Beck, with a screenplay by James Dickey; The Call of the Wild, a 1993 American TV film starring Rick Schroder; and Call of the Wild, a 2000 adventure TV series on Animal Planet.)
- Cujo, a dog who had his friendly demeanour ruthlessly taken from him by rabies and became crazed, terrorizing some of the residents of the fictional town of Castle Rock, Maine from the 1981 Stephen King novel Cujo and the 1983 film of the same name.
- Digby, the talking dog from the Canadian sitcom series Dog House. Originally a police dog, his mind is swapped with that of his human partner before the latter dies in an accident, and he is taken custody by the officer's sister-in-law and her children.
- George, eponymous dog in the film George! (1971) and its 1972–73 spin-off television series.
- Josef, (Niebla in the Spanish version, Nebbia in the Italian version) from the Japanese anime series Heidi, Girl of the Alps (Alps no Shoujo Heidi), and the 2015 remake.
- Nana, in the Disney and Universal/Columbia Peter Pan films (but a Newfoundland in J. M. Barrie's original play and novel).
- Neil, the martini-slurping St. Bernard of George and Marion Kerby in the 1950s TV series Topper. This was a follow-up to the films Topper, Topper Takes a Trip, and Topper Returns.

=== Legend ===
The famous St. Bernard Barry found a small boy in the snow and persuaded the child to climb on his back. The dog then carried the boy to safety.

== See also ==
- List of dog breeds
- Dog sports
