= Barry (dog) =

Swiss mountain rescue dog (1800–1814)

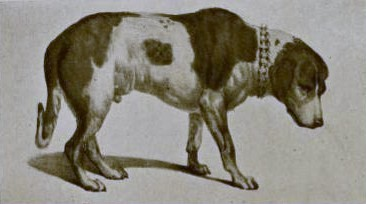
- A drawing of Barry, preserved at the Natural History Museum of Bern prior to the modifications conducted in 1923.
- Other name: The Saint of Saints
- Species: Canis familiaris
- Breed: Referred to as a Küherhund or Alpine Mastiff; later as a St. Bernard
- Sex: Male
- Born: Barry der Menschenretter; 1800; Great St Bernard Hospice, Pennine Alps
- Died: 1814; Bern, Switzerland
- Nationality: Swiss-Italian
- Occupation: Search and rescue dog
- Employer: Great St Bernard Hospice
- Years active: 1800–1812
- Weight: 40–45 kg (88–99 lb)
- Height: Less than 64 cm (25 in)

Barry der Menschenretter (1800–1814), also known as Barry, was a dog of a breed which was later called the St. Bernard that worked as a mountain rescue dog in Switzerland and Italy for the Great St Bernard Hospice. He predates the modern St. Bernard, and was lighter built than the modern breed. He has been described as the most famous St. Bernard, as he was credited with saving more than 40 lives during his lifetime, hence his byname Menschenretter meaning "people rescuer" in German.

The legend surrounding him was that he was killed while attempting a rescue; however, this is untrue. Barry retired to Bern, Switzerland and after his death his body was passed into the care of the Natural History Museum of Bern. His skin has been preserved through taxidermy although his skull was modified in 1923 to match the Saint Bernard of that time period. His story and name have been used in literary works, and a monument to him stands in the Cimetière des Chiens near Paris. At the hospice, one dog has always been named Barry in his honor; and since 2004, the Fondation Barry du Grand Saint Bernard has been set up to take over the responsibility for breeding dogs from the hospice.

== History ==
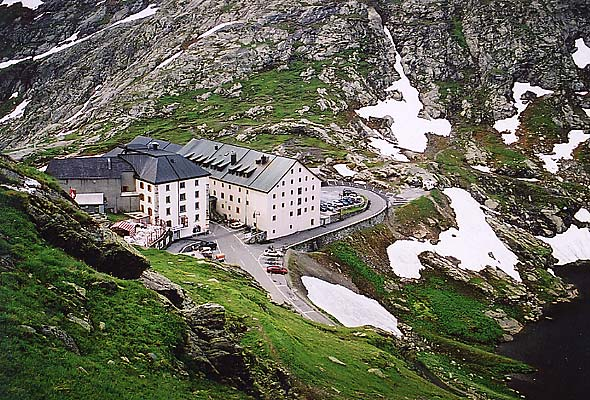
The Great St Bernard Hospice

The first mention in the Great St Bernard Hospice archives of a dog was in 1707 which simply said "A dog was buried by us." The dogs are thought to have been introduced to the monastery as watchdogs at some point between 1660 and 1670. Old skulls from the collection of the Natural History Museum of Bern show that at least two types of dog lived at the hospice. By 1800, the year that Barry was born, it was known that a special kind of dog was being used for rescue work in the pass. This general variety of dog was known as a Küherhund, or cowherd's dog.

Measurements of his preserved body show that Barry was significantly smaller and lighter built than the modern Saint Bernard, weighing between 40 and 45 kilograms (88 and 99 lb) whereas modern Bernards weigh between 54 and 81kg (120 to 180lbs) His current mounted height is approximately 64 centimetres (25 in), but the living Barry would have been slightly smaller. Although Barry was definitely of the original Saint Bernard breed, depictions of him in media, especially picture books, are usually a dog of the modern Saint Bernard breed.

During Barry's career, he was credited with saving the lives of more than forty people, although this number has sometimes varied over the years. Barry's most famous rescue was that of a young boy. He found the child asleep in a cavern of ice. After warming up the boy's body sufficiently by licking him, he moved the boy about and onto his back and carried the child back to the hospice. The child survived and was returned to his parents, although other sources say that the boy's mother died in the avalanche that trapped the boy. The Natural History Museum of Bern disputes the legend, attributing it to Peter Scheitlin, an animal psychologist.

The best of dogs, the best of animals is Barry. You used to leave the convent with a basket round your neck, into the storm, in the most insidious snow. Each and every day you examined the mountain searching for unfortunates buried under avalanches. You dug them out and brought them back to life by yourself and, when you couldn't, you rushed back to the convent signalling the monks for help. You resurrected people. Your tenderness was so easy to communicate, that the boy you dug out had no fear to let you bring him, holding on to your back, to the Hospice.

— Peter Scheitlin, Complete Study on Animal Instinct

=== Death ===
There is a plaque on a monument in the Cimetière des Chiens pet cemetery in France which states, "Il sauva la vie à 40 personnes. Il fut tué par le 41ème" ("He saved the lives of forty people. He was killed by the forty-first"). The story goes that news had come that a Swiss soldier was lost in the mountains. Barry was searching for the soldier and had picked up the scent, some forty-eight hours old, and finally stopped before a large bank of ice. He dug until he reached the soldier, and then licked him as he was trained. The Swiss soldier awoke startled and mistook Barry for a wolf and fatally stabbed him with his bayonet. James Watson in his 1906 work The Dog Book attributed the rumour to fellow author Idstone, also known as Reverend Thomas Pearce.

However, the legend of his death is untrue. After twelve years of service at the monastery, Barry was brought by a canon of the monastery to Bern, Switzerland, so that he could live out the rest of his life. He died at the age of 14. His body passed into the hands of the Natural History Museum of Bern. A special exhibition was held in his honour at the museum to commemorate his 200th birthday in 2000.

== Legacy ==
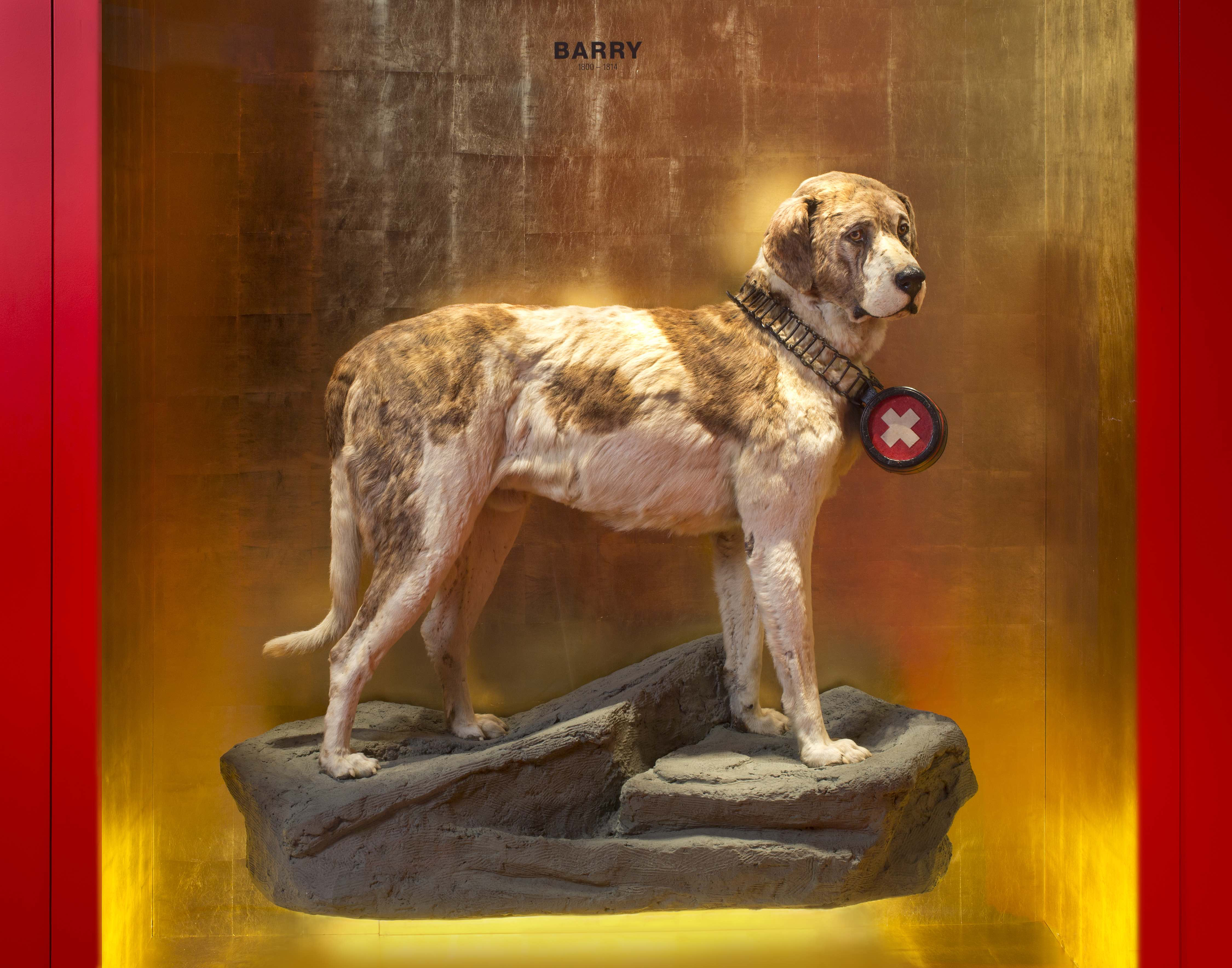
Barry's preserved body as currently on display at the Natural History Museum, Bern

The Hospice has always maintained one St. Bernard named Barry in the original's honor. During Barry's lifetime, his breed did not have one specific name. By 1820, six years after his death, Barry was specifically referred to as being an Alpine Mastiff, while there was also a breed called the Alpine Spaniel which was recorded around the same time period.

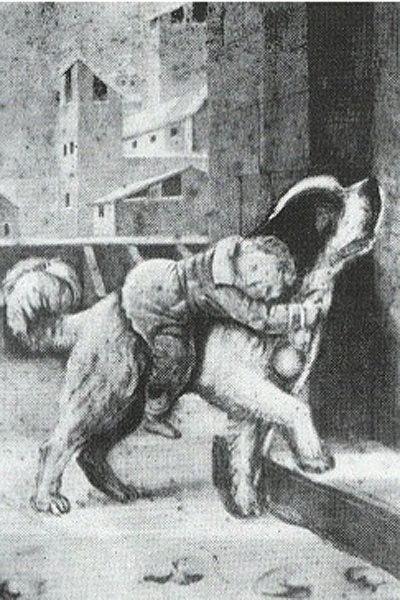
Drawing of Barry with a small child.

The English called the breed "sacred dogs", while the German Kynology proposed the name "Alpendog" in 1828. Following his death and up until 1860, the entire stock were called "Barry hounds" in the Canton of Bern after Barry himself. It was not until 1865 when the term "St. Bernard" was first used primarily for the breed. Under this name, the St. Bernard has been recognised since 1880 by the Swiss Kennel Club.

Barry is described as the most famous St. Bernard by the Natural History Museum of Bern. Following his death, his skin was preserved by a taxidermist for the museum, while the rest of his body was buried. He was originally given a humble and meek pose, as the taxidermist felt that this would serve as a reminder of servitude to future generations. In 1923, his body was refurbished by Georg Ruprecht, as his coat had become brittle and had broken into more than 20 pieces. During the restoration, his body was re-posed and his skull shape was modified to match the shape of the St. Bernard of that time, in a compromise between Ruprecht and the Museum's director. His original head shape was rather flat with a moderate stop, with the modification resulting in a larger head with a more pronounced stop. A barrel was added hanging from his collar, following the popularization of the myth of the monastery's dogs using these during the rescues, which was originally introduced by Edwin Landseer's work Alpine Mastiffs Reanimating a Distressed Traveller. The barrel was removed in 1978 by Professor Walter Huber, the director of the museum, although it has since been replaced. A monument to Barry is located opposite the entrance to the Cimetière des Chiens in Paris.

In literary works, Samuel Rogers' poem The Great Saint Bernard is sometimes referred to as Barry, The Great St. Bernard. Henry Bordeaux praised Barry's work in his 1911 novel La Neige sur les pas.

Walt Disney Productions made a telemovie for The Wonderful World of Disney entitled Barry of the Great St. Bernard in 1977, based on a story written by Adolf Fux. Barry's story has also been featured in children's books such as Barry: The Bravest Saint Bernard published by Random House Books for Young Readers.

Until September 2004, 18 dogs still belonged to the hospice at any one time. The Foundation Barry du Grand Saint Bernard was established to create kennels in Martigny, a village further down the pass, to take over the breeding of St. Bernard puppies from the friars at the hospice. Around 20 puppies per year are born at the foundation. In 2009, the St. Bernard Dog Museum was opened at the Foundation in Martigny and – to commemorate the occasion – Barry's remains were lent from the museum in Bern. Each summer, the foundation leads dogs up the pass when it is open to the hospice, mainly for tourists, with rescue efforts on the pass now conducted by helicopters.

As of 1995 Barry is the single official hallmark for all precious metals and all fineness standards in Switzerland.

== See also ==
- List of individual dogs
