= Alpine Mastiffs Reanimating a Distressed Traveller =

Painting by Edwin Landseer

Alpine Mastiffs Reanimating a Distressed Traveler
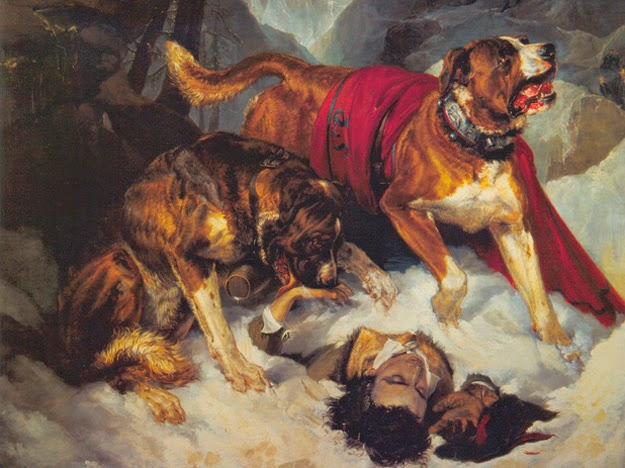
- Artist: Edwin Landseer
- Year: 1820
- Type: Oil on canvas, genre painting
- Dimensions: 189 cm × 237 cm (74 in × 93 in)
- Location: National Gallery of Art; Washington D.C.

Alpine Mastiffs Reanimating a Distressed Traveller is an 1820 oil painting by the British artist Edwin Landseer. It depicts a view in the Alps with Saint Bernard dogs coming to the assistance of a stranger, travelling through the pass who is buried in snow through the effects of an avalanche.

It was produced very early in his career at a time when the eighteen-year-old Landseer had never visited the Swiss setting of the scene. It was displayed at the 1820 exhibition of the British Institution, where it was widely praised. Today it is in the collection of the National Gallery of Art in Washington.

== Bibliography ==
- Ormond, Richard. Sir Edwin Landseer. Philadelphia Museum of Art, 1981.
