= ARHGEF10 =

Protein-coding gene in the species Homo sapiens

Identifiers
- Aliases: ARHGEF10, GEF10, SNCV, Rho guanine nucleotide exchange factor 10
- External IDs: OMIM: 608136; MGI: 2444453; GeneCards: ARHGEF10

Gene location (Human)
Chr.	Chromosome 8 (human)
Band	8p23.3	Start	1,823,926 bp
Band	8p23.3	End	1,958,641 bp

Gene location (Mouse)
Chr.	Chromosome 8 (mouse)
Band	8|8 A1.1	Start	14,911,663 bp
Band	8|8 A1.1	End	15,001,085 bp
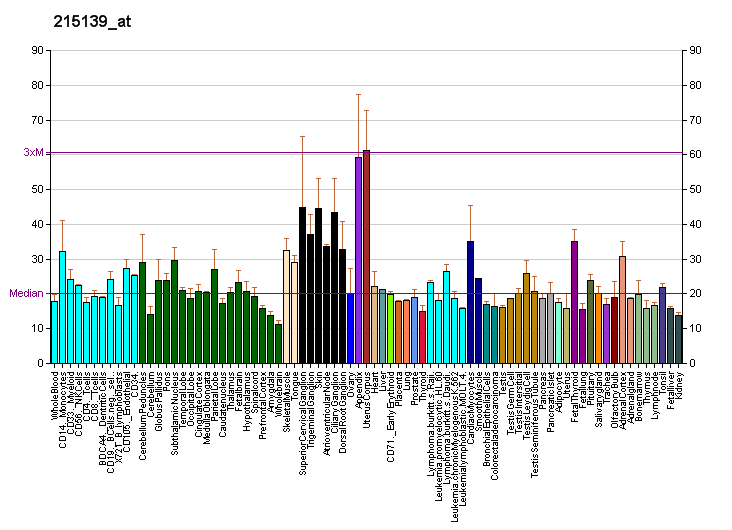
RNA expression pattern
Bgee	Human / Mouse (ortholog); Top expressed in: sural nerve; right lung; corpus callosum; apex of heart; C1 segment; upper lobe of left lung; ascending aorta; gastric mucosa; right testis; Descending thoracic aorta / Top expressed in: sciatic nerve; submandibular gland; deep cerebellar nuclei; ascending aorta; globus pallidus; lumbar subsegment of spinal cord; genital tubercle; aortic valve; molar; optic nerve; More reference expression data
BioGPS	More reference expression data
Gene ontology
Molecular function	protein binding; kinesin binding; guanyl-nucleotide exchange factor activity
Cellular component	cytosol; centrosome
Biological process	mitotic spindle assembly; regulation of Rho protein signal transduction; positive regulation of stress fiber assembly; myelination in peripheral nervous system; centrosome duplication; activation of GTPase activity; actin cytoskeleton organization
Sources:Amigo / QuickGO
Orthologs
Databases	NCBI: entry; OMA: entry
Species	Human	Mouse
Entrez	9639	234094
Ensembl	ENSG00000104728; ENSG00000274726	ENSMUSG00000071176
UniProt	O15013	Q8C033
RefSeq (mRNA)	NM_001308152; NM_001308153; NM_014629	NM_001037736; NM_172751
RefSeq (protein)	NP_001295081; NP_001295082; NP_055444	NP_001032825; NP_766339
Location (UCSC)	Chr 8: 1.82 – 1.96 Mb	Chr 8: 14.91 – 15 Mb
PubMed search
- Wikidata
View/Edit Human	View/Edit Mouse

The human ARHGEF10 gene encodes the protein Rho guanine nucleotide exchange factor 10.

Rho GTPases play a fundamental role in numerous cellular processes that are initiated by extracellular stimuli that work through G protein coupled receptors. The encoded protein may form a complex with G proteins and stimulate Rho-dependent signals.
