= Great St Bernard Hospice =

Hostel in Switzerland

Coordinates: 45°52′08″N 7°10′14″E

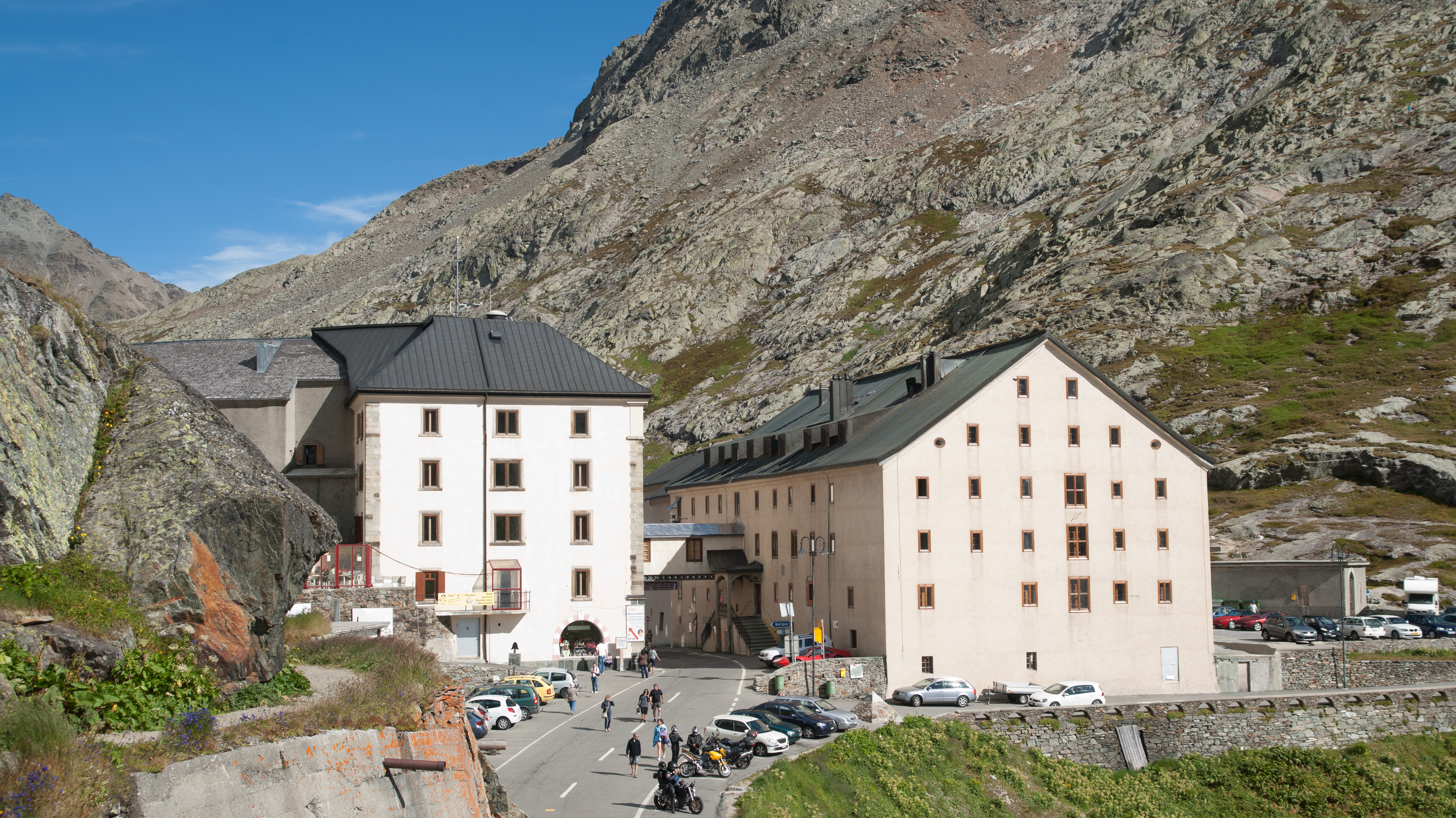
Great St. Bernard Hospice

Location in Switzerland

The Great St Bernard Hospice (French: Hospice du Grand St-Bernard; Italian: Ospizio del Gran San Bernardo; German: Hospiz auf dem Grossen St. Bernhard), named after its founder Bernard of Menthon, is a hospice and hostel for travelers at the Great St Bernard Pass in Switzerland. The hostel has been operated by a community of canons regular since its founding.

At an elevation of 2,469 m (8,100 ft) in the Pennine Alps, it is located a few hundred metres north from the border with Italy. It is part of the municipality of Bourg-Saint-Pierre in the Swiss canton of Valais.

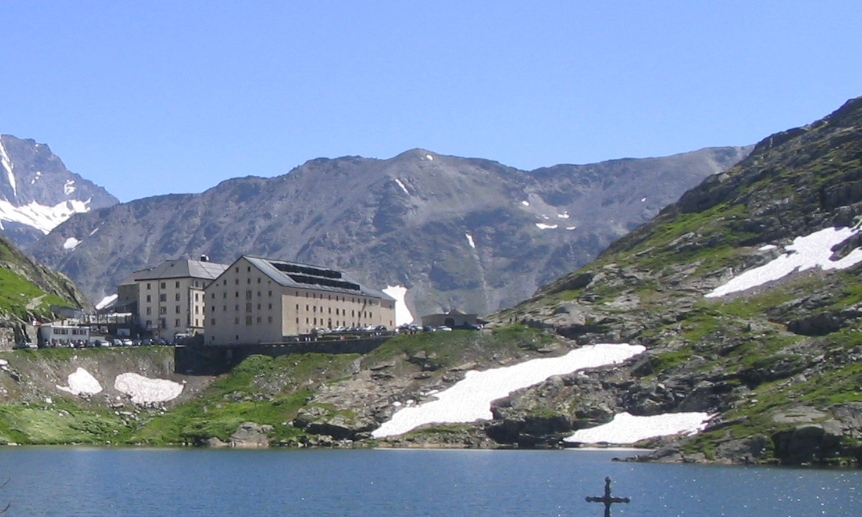
View from the lake

== History ==
The first hospice or monastery was built in the 9th century at Bourg-Saint-Pierre, which was mentioned for the first time around 812-820. This was destroyed by Saracen incursions in the mid-10th century, probably in 940, the date at which they also occupied Saint-Maurice. Around 1050, Saint Bernard of Menthon, archdeacon of Aosta, regularly saw travellers arriving terrorised and distressed, so he decided to put an end to mountain brigandage in the area. With this in mind, he founded the hospice at the pass which later bore his name (it was originally dedicated to St Nicholas). The church's first textual mention is in a document of 1125. The hospice was placed under the jurisdiction of the bishop of Sion, prefect and count of Valais, thus explaining why the northern versant of the pass is now in Swiss territory.

=== St. Bernard dog ===
The St Bernard dog breed was created at the hospice from cross-breeding dogs, probably those offered by families in Valais in the 1660s and 1670s. The first definite mention of the breed is in 1709. The breed was originally raised to provide guard dogs for the hospice before they became mountain rescue dogs. The St Bernards were specially bred and trained for the role of mountain rescue because they were sufficiently strong to cross deep snow drifts and could track lost travellers by scent. The first evidence that the dogs were in use at the monastery is in two paintings dating to 1690 by Salvator Rosa.

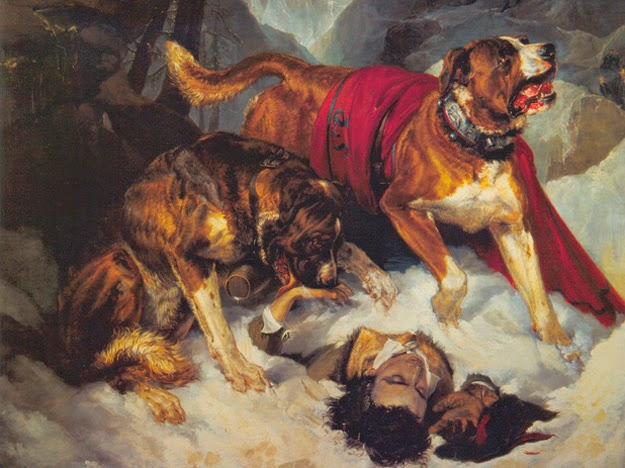
Alpine Mastiffs Reanimating a Distressed Traveller by Edwin Landseer, a painting thought to have started the legend that St Bernard dogs carried brandy kegs.

The dogs are often depicted as carrying a small flask of brandy around their necks to revive travellers. While this appears to have generally been a 19th-century myth, there was at least one dog that did. In The Percy Anecdotes, by Thomas Byerley, published in 1823, the following anecdote appears and was often quoted in other books in the 19th century:

The breed of dogs kept by the monks to assist them ... has been long celebrated for its sagacity and fidelity. All the oldest and most tried of them were lately buried, along with some unfortunate travellers, under a valanche [sic], but three or four hopeful puppies were left at home in the convent and still survive. The most celebrated of those who are no more was a dog called Barry. This animal served the hospital for twelve years, during which time he saved the lives of forty individuals. His zeal was indefatigable. Whenever the mountain was enveloped in fogs and snow, he set out in search of lost travellers. He was accustomed to running and barking until he lost breath and frequently ventured on the most perilous places. When he found his strength was insufficient to draw from the snow a traveller benumbed with cold, he would run back to the hospital in search of the monks....

When old age deprived him of strength, the Prior of the Convent pensioned him at Berney, by way of reward. After his death, his hide was stuffed and deposited in the museum of that town. The little phial, in which he carried a reviving liquor for the distressed travellers whom he found among the mountains, is still suspended from his neck.

The last recorded rescue by one of the dogs was in 1955, although as late as 2004, eighteen of the animals were still kept at the Hospice for reasons of sentiment and tradition. In 2004, the breeding of the dogs was undertaken by the Barry foundation at Martigny, and the remaining St Bernards were transferred there from the Hospice. They remain a tourist attraction, and a number of the animals are temporarily relocated from Martigny to the Hospice during the summer months.

== Memorial ==
In June 1800, Napoleon Bonaparte ordered a monumental tomb to be built at the Hospice for Louis Desaix (killed at the Battle of Marengo), even though Desaix had not crossed the Alps with the armée de réserve. His body rested at Milan from 1800 to 1805, when it was buried at the hospice in the presence of Louis-Alexandre Berthier representing the emperor. A commemorative monument set up there in a chapel was moved in 1829, so that Desaix now lies anonymous under an altar dedicated to Saint Faustina.

== In popular culture ==
The monastery is the setting for one chapter in the 1857 Charles Dickens novel Little Dorrit, wherein some cold travellers and their mules spend the night, and are compared to some frozen unidentified dead bodies in the mortuary, which had been recovered from the mountain by the Fathers. The dogs and some outlying refuge shelters maintained by the monks are also mentioned. Dickens visited the place and saw the mortuary in 1846, and described it in a letter to his friend and biographer John Forster dated 6 September 1846. The Swedish writer and reformer Fredrika Bremer also visited the Hospice, and recorded her experience in vol. 1 of Life in the Old World (English trans. by Mary Howitt, 1860). The monastery also is referred to in the 8th stanza of Henry Longfellow's poem Excelsior. The Croatian writer and journalist Marija Jurić Zagorka mentions Hospice in her novel Jadranka.

== Sources ==
- (in French) Jean-Luc Rouiller, Le Valais par les dates : une chronologie des origines à nos jours, dans Annales valaisannes, 1999, p. 105, 106, 109.
- (in French) Le Grand-Saint-Bernard (collectif), dans Les chanoines réguliers de Saint-Augustin en Valais, Bâle, 1997 (Helvetia sacra, IV/1)
- (in French) Lucien Quaglia, La maison du Grand-Saint-Bernard des origines aux temps actuels, Martigny, 1972.
