= Hygroma (canine disease) =

Canine disease

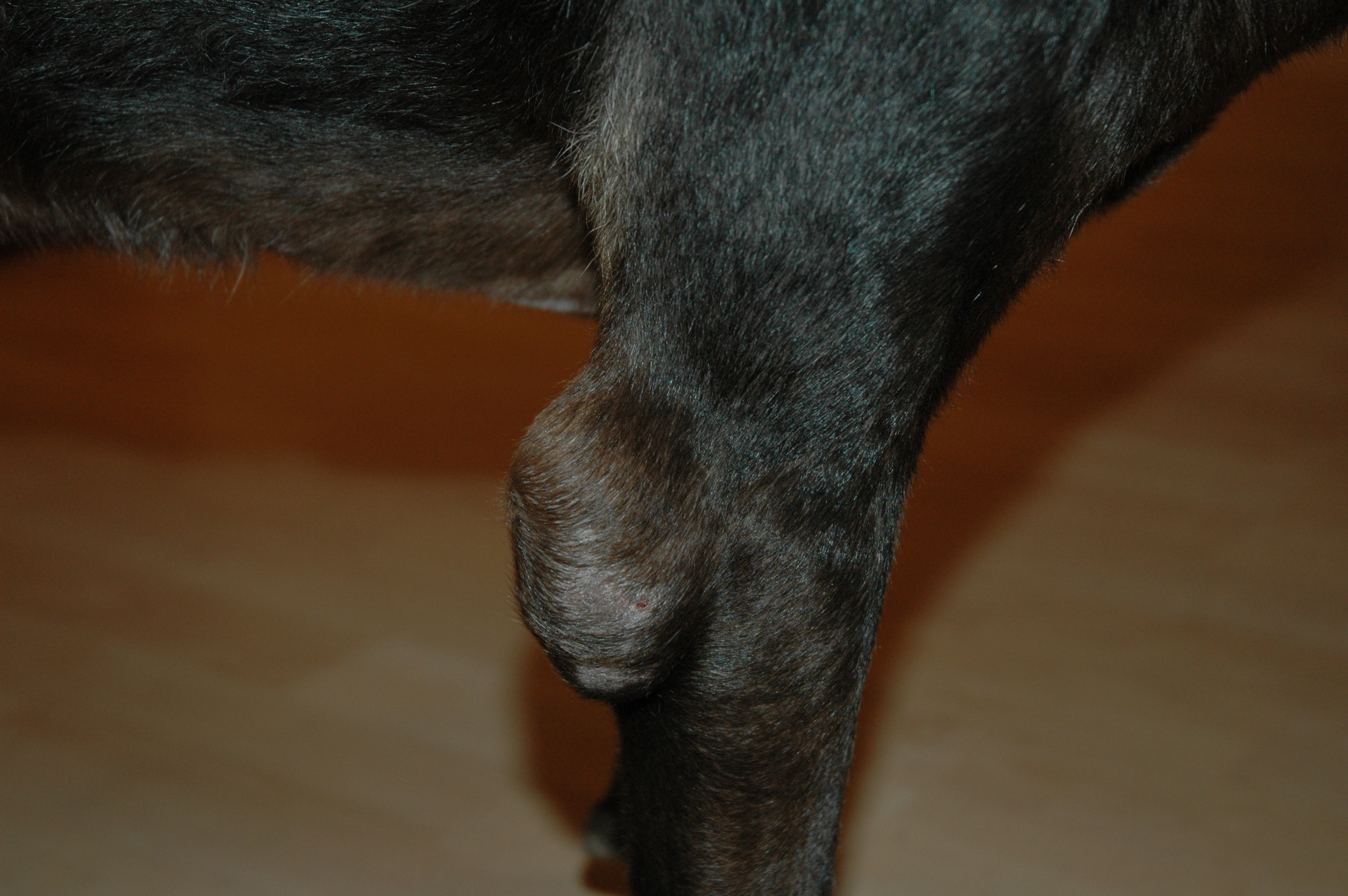
Hygroma on the leg of a Labrador Retriever

A hygroma, or a false bursa, is a discrete, fluid-filled sac that can form on the joints of dogs in response to repeated pressure, such as that from sitting on a hard surface. It is treated by draining the fluid and may be prevented by providing padded bedding.

== Treatment ==
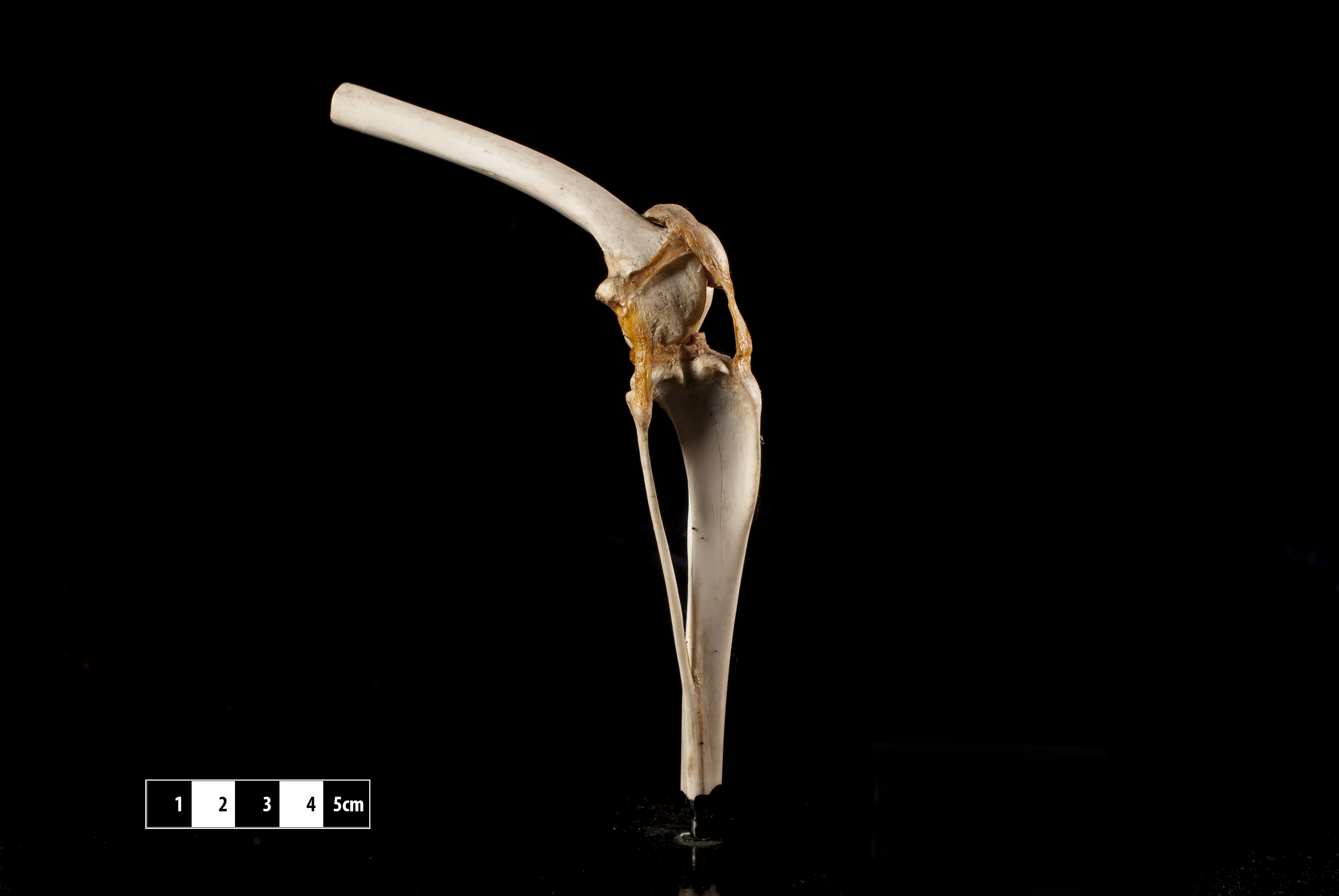
Knee joint of dog. Piece showing knee joint of dog.

An untreated hygroma can develop into a large swelling that stresses the surrounding skin and becomes an open wound with the possibility of infection that is much more difficult to treat. In most cases, a hygroma is a single occurrence for an animal, but other individuals will have repeated problems with hygromas.

=== Surgery or aspiration ===
FNA and surgery is often not recommended, as these can introduce infection and the hygroma will return. Donut bandages and soft bedding are key to treating. In the past, it was common for veterinarians to treat hygromas by aspiration (using a syringe and drawing the fluid out) or surgically placing a drain. This can address the symptom, but does not treat the cause of the hygroma. In addition, any incision at a joint can be difficult to close and may result in an open sore. Consequently, the recommended treatment of choice for most hygromas is no longer aspiration or surgery, but commercially available elbow pads made for the treatment of this condition.

=== Additional bedding ===
Providing bedding or other padding in the areas the animal lies down can be helpful. In addition, trauma to the joint may occur during play or other physical activities.

=== Coverage and padding ===
There are solutions available to cover and protect the elbow joint.

== See also ==
- Dog skin disorders
