= Natural History Museum of Bern =

Coordinates: 46°56′31″N 7°26′56″E

Natural History Museum of Berne
- Naturhistorisches Museum Bern
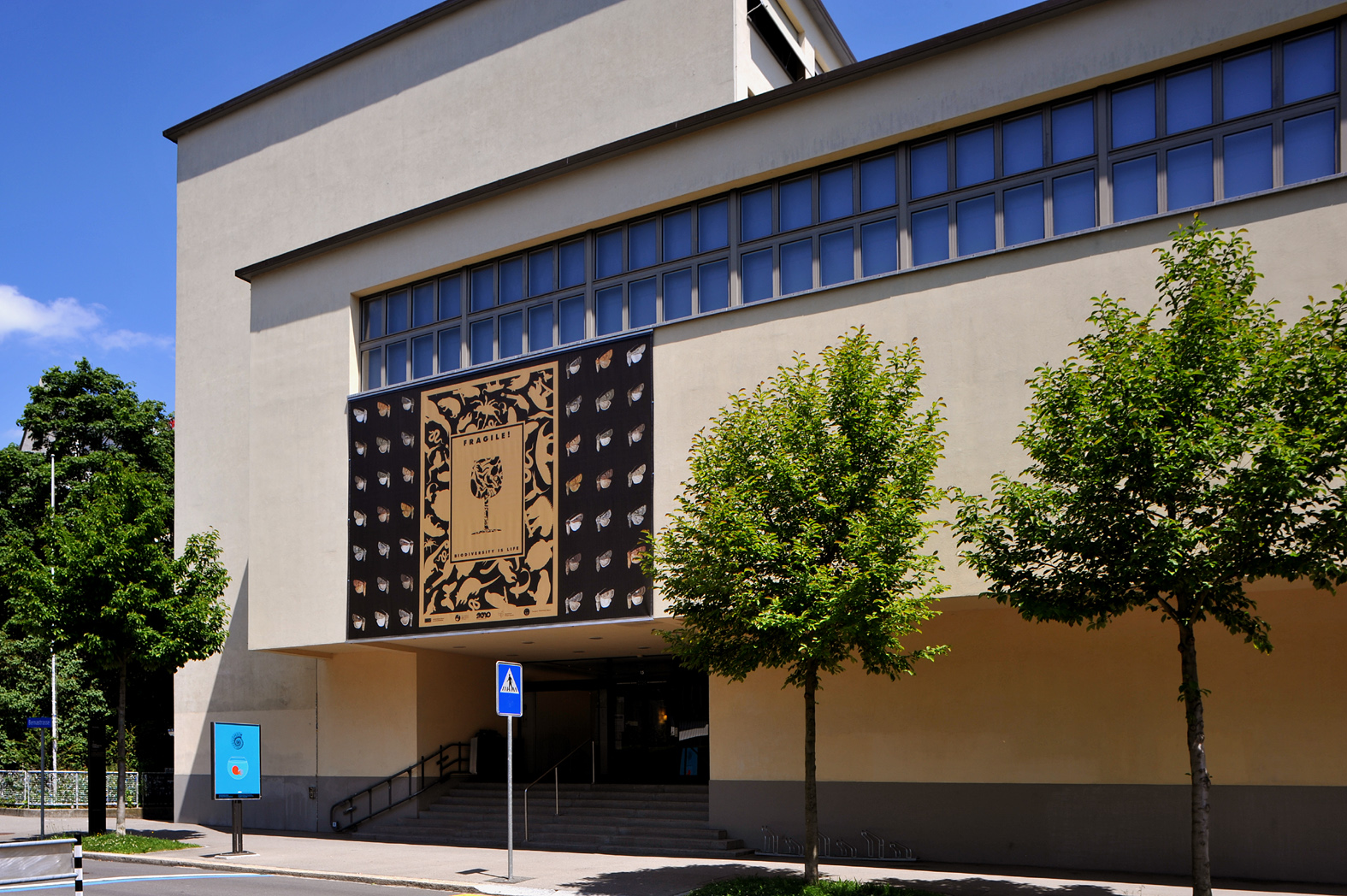
- The current building was opened in 1936
- Established: 1832
- Location: Bernastrasse 15, 3005 Berne, Switzerland
- Type: Natural history museum
- Visitors: 131,000 (2016)
- Director: Dr. Christopher Beer
- Owner: Bürgergemeinde Bern
- Website: www.nmbe.ch

The Natural History Museum of Bern (German: Naturhistorisches Museum Bern) is a museum in Bern, Switzerland. In its teaching and research it cooperates closely with the University of Bern. It is visited by around 131,000 people yearly.

== History ==
The museum is owned by the Burgergemeinde of Bern, so it is also known as Naturhistorisches Museum der Burgergemeinde Bern. It was officially founded in 1832. It is located on Bernastrasse, in the Kirchenfeld quarter, in a building that was erected between 1932 and 1934, opened in 1936 and expanded several times since then. Previously the exhibits were kept in a building on Hodlerstrasse built from 1878 to 1881 and demolished in 1936; and earlier still, in the library gallery of a former college building. In 2016, the museum was visited by around 131,000 people.

== Collection ==
The museum is known for its set of over 220 life-sized dioramas, featuring preserved animals from Switzerland, Africa and Asia; it also owns a collection of minerals from the Alpine region, samples of gold discovered at various locations in Switzerland, meteorites, a large stock of invertebrates, and Switzerland's largest collection of animal skeletons and bones.

=== Mammal dioramas ===
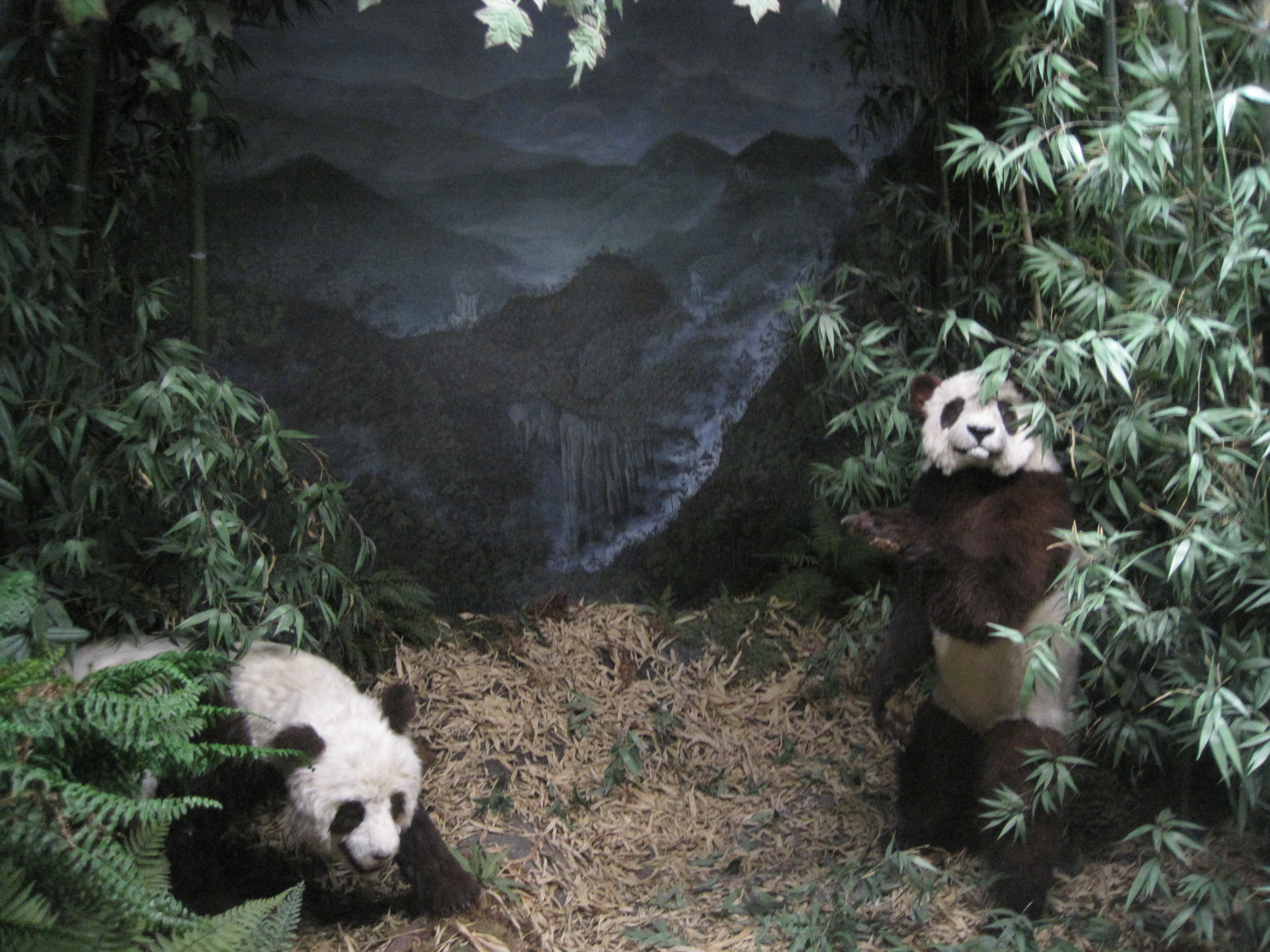
The museum's panda diorama, located in Asian Mammals.

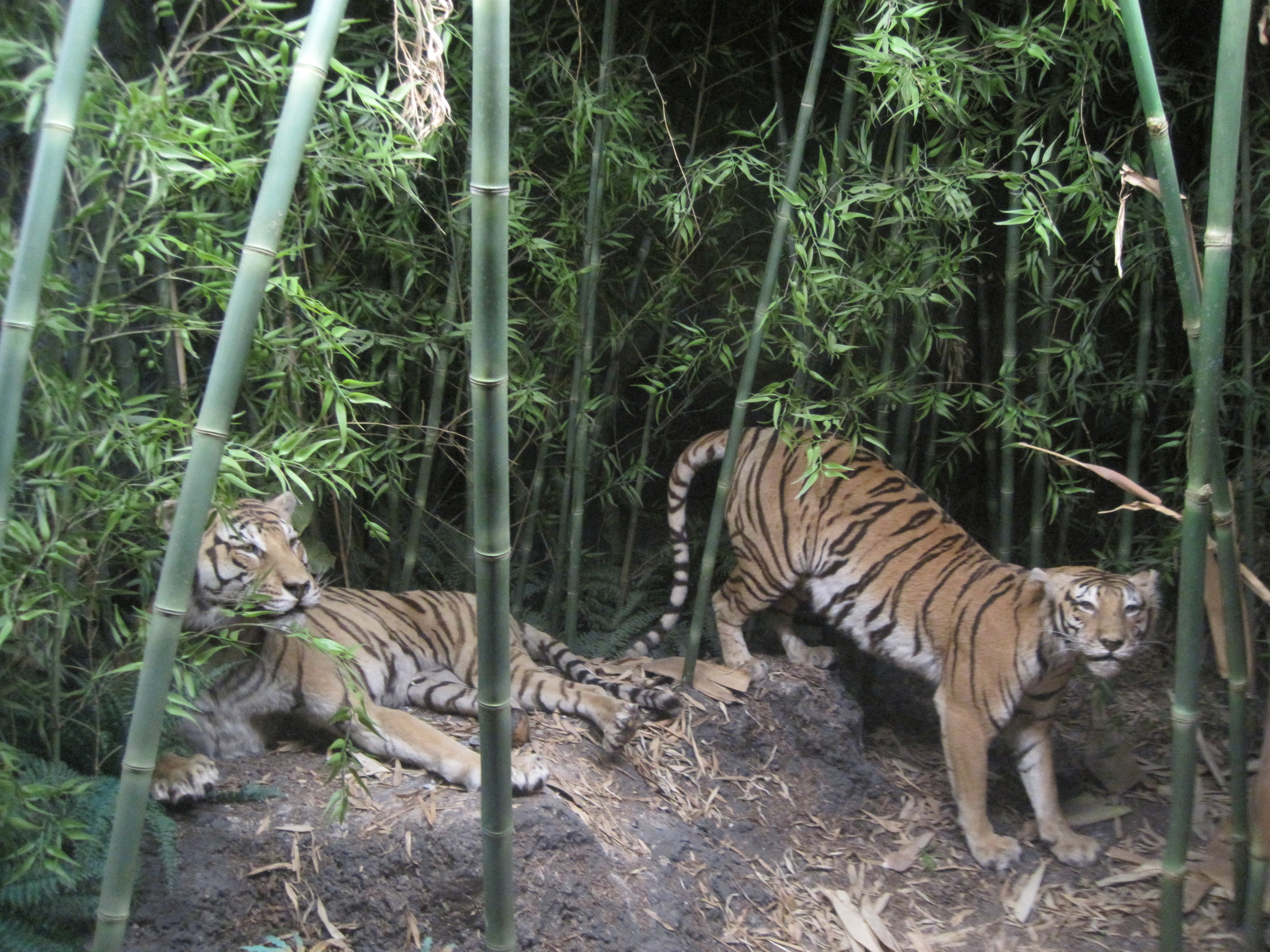
The tiger diorama, located in Asian Mammals

The dioramas originate from a collection of big game animals from Africa, bagged by the London-based Bernese painter and game hunter Bernhard von Wattenwyl (together with his daughter Vivienne) during an expedition in 1923–24. A total of 130 of these animals are on display, in 33 dioramas along two darkened corridors. The dioramas are designed and furnished according to the animals' natural habitat.

There is a further section displaying native birds and mammals, with over 600 animals in 164 dioramas. This section was previously on display in the Heimatmuseum, opened around the outbreak of World War II.

The upper basement contains five dioramas of Asian animals threatened with extinction: snow leopards, orangutans, giant pandas, Indian rhinoceroses, and tigers.

A fourth section called "Nordic Animals" features stuffed bears, muskoxen, seals, moose and birds, in nine dioramas containing 66 individual animals.

One of the museum's biggest attractions is the stuffed hide of Barry, the St. Bernard who is said to have saved the lives of over 40 people. A special exhibit dedicated to him was held in 2001.

=== C'est la Vie ===
The museum's largest exhibit draws on the four million items to explore the biological and psychological facets of life. Visitors are invited to use sight, smell and sound to discover the world's tremendous biodiversity and its greater implications in human existence. Films, tactile and audio installations attempt to not only present scientific answers to these basic questions, but illustrate philosophy into the metaphysics of studying life.

The exhibit's first section repeats the phrase "There is no life without death." Part of the exhibition's definition of life is that all living things die, and through their decomposition stimulate more life. This section presents the life inside a pig carcass (paradisaically living off of the pig's demise), the oldest living animal (the Antarctic glass sponge) and the human fascination with death (featuring many art installations including H. R. Giger's original mask for the film Alien). The museum is, in essence, a repository for dead animals, and this section pays homage to their collectors and exhibits. Visitors look onto treasures through a transparent floor in somewhat of a meta-mission: the museum too was founded on a fascination with the death of the world around us.

The second section discusses gender and sexuality. Thus, the exhibit expands its definition to note that all living things must reproduce and pass along their traits. Avian mating displays show the advantages and disadvantages of this system: the decorated male bird may attract predators as well as an appreciative female and his elaborate plumage may make it hard to fly. Over in the corner, a life-sized blue whale head and an oversized sea turtle represent r/K selection theory. This cycle of risk and benefit hinders even human childbirth. Larger brains give humans a clear advantage, but complicate biophysical matters with an enlarged braincase.

The "World in the Head" section looks at the senses, the brain and the idea of consciousness. A Gertrude Stein quote and small animatronic display illustrates the senses that humans do not have. A mirrored room metaphorically takes the visitor into an infinity and asks if vision requires an infinite amount of brain activity.

=== Die Grosse Knochenschau ===
The largest collection of animal skeletons and bones in Switzerland is displayed under the name "The Big Bone Show" (Die grosse Knochenschau). This room exhibits over 300 skeletons, including those of a fin whale and an Asian elephant. Eight of the larger skeletons sit upon a continually revolving carousel. The display cabinets contain numerous further exhibits, including 518 individual bones.

=== Albert Heim Foundation ===
The Albert Heim Foundation for the promotion of cynological research is based at the museum, and possesses the world's largest collection of canine skulls.

== World Spider Catalog ==
In 2014 the Natural History Museum of Bern took over the World Spider Catalog, created in 2000 by Norman I. Platnick of the American Museum of Natural History, converting it to a relational database.

== See also ==
- List of museums in Bern
- List of museums in Switzerland
