= Licking (disambiguation) =

Licking is the action of passing the tongue over a surface.

Licking may also refer to the following places:

- Licking, Missouri, U.S.
- Licking County, Ohio, U.S.
- Licking Creek (disambiguation)
- Licking River (disambiguation)
- Licking Township (disambiguation)

== See also ==
- Lick (disambiguation)
- Licker (disambiguation)
