= Lick =

Lick may refer to:

- Licking, the action of passing the tongue over a surface

== Places ==
- Lick (crater), a crater on the Moon named after James Lick
- 1951 Lick, an asteroid named after James Lick
- Lick Township, Jackson County, Ohio, United States

== People ==
- Lick (surname), people with "Lick" as a surname
  - Dennis Lick (born 1954), American professional football lineman
  - James Lick (1796–1876), American carpenter, land baron, and patron of the sciences
- J. C. R. Licklider (1915–1990), American computer scientist, nicknamed "Lick"

== Music ==
- Lick (album), by The Lemonheads
- Lick (music), a short phrase, or series of notes, often improvised by a musician
  - The Lick, a jazz lick, commonly known as 'The Lick'
- "Lick" (Joi song), 2002
- "Lick" (Shenseea and Megan Thee Stallion song), 2022

== Nature ==
- Lick (stream), a small or ephemeral stream
- Salt lick, a salt deposit that animals regularly lick

== Other uses ==
- Lick's Homeburgers, a Canadian restaurant chain
- Lick, strike with a paddle during school corporal punishment in the United States
- Lick Observatory, an astronomical observatory in California named after James Lick
- The Lick with Trevor Nelson, a British music television show presented by Trevor Nelson
- Lick, a 2024 film directed by Louise Alston

== See also ==
- Lick High School (disambiguation)
- Licking (disambiguation)
- Licker (disambiguation)
