= Lik =

Lik may refer to:

- Ngelik, or lik, in Indonesian music, a part of a gamelan composition
- Hon Lik (born 1951), Chinese pharmacist who invented the modern electronic cigarette
- James Lik (1977–2022), American college football and rugby union player
- Ma Lik (1952–2007), Hong Kong politician
- Peter Lik (born 1959), Australian photographer

== See also ==
- Lick (disambiguation)
- Like (disambiguation)
- LIK
