= Like (disambiguation) =

Like is a word in English with a number of common uses.

Like or likes may also refer to:

== Computing and Internet ==
- Like button, a feature of social-networking websites such as Facebook, YouTube, or blogs
- Like.com, a price-comparison service website
- LIKE, a short video sharing platform

== Places ==
- Like, Tampere, a shopping centre in Lielahti, Tampere, Finland
- Like, Srebrenik, a village in Bosnia and Herzegovina

== Products ==
- Like Cola, an unsuccessful cola soft drink
- Mitsuoka Like, an automobile
- Like, a model of motor scooter by Taiwanese manufacturer Kymco

== Music ==
- The Like, a rock band
- Like (producer), a member of hip hop trio Pac Div
- Likes..., a 2004 album by Dani Siciliano
- "Like", a song by Taproot from the album Welcome
- "Likes", a song by Yuna and Kyle from the album Rouge
- Like..?, a 2023 extended play (EP) by American rapper Ice Spice
- ”Like”, a song by Ice Spice from the album Y2k! : I’m Just A Girl (Deluxe)

== Other ==
- Likay (rendered as like), a form of Thai folk theatre
- Like (novel), a 1997 novel by Ali Smith
- Like (TV series), a Mexican telenovela

== See also ==
- Li Ke (disambiguation)
- Liking (disambiguation)
- Lik (disambiguation)
- Likee
- Likey
