= LIK =

LIK may refer to:

- LIK (magazine), a Bulgarian culture magazine
- Love Insurance Kompany, a 2026 Indian Tamil-language film

== See also ==
- Lik (disambiguation)
