= Kymco Maxxer =

All-terrain vehicle

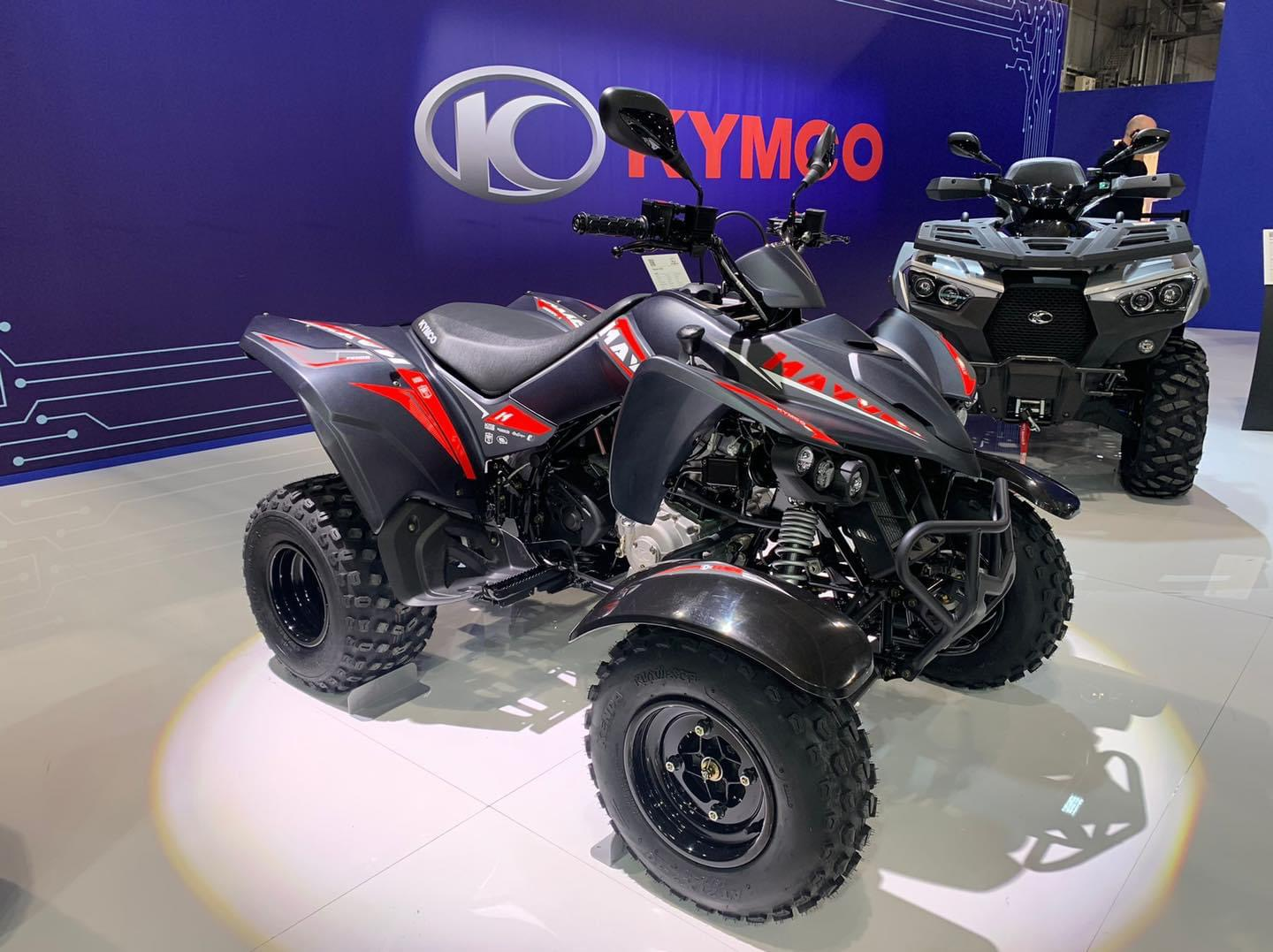

Overview
- Manufacturer: Kymco
- Production: 2005–present

Body and chassis
- Class: All-terrain vehicle

The Kymco Maxxer is a line of all-terrain vehicles (ATV) produced by Kymco since 2005. The range includes the Maxxer 50, 90, 300, 400 and 450i.

== History ==
The Maxxer entered production in late 2005. It initially offered two models, the Maxxer 50 and 300. In 2010, Kymco introduced the Maxxer 450i.
