= Kymco AK550 =

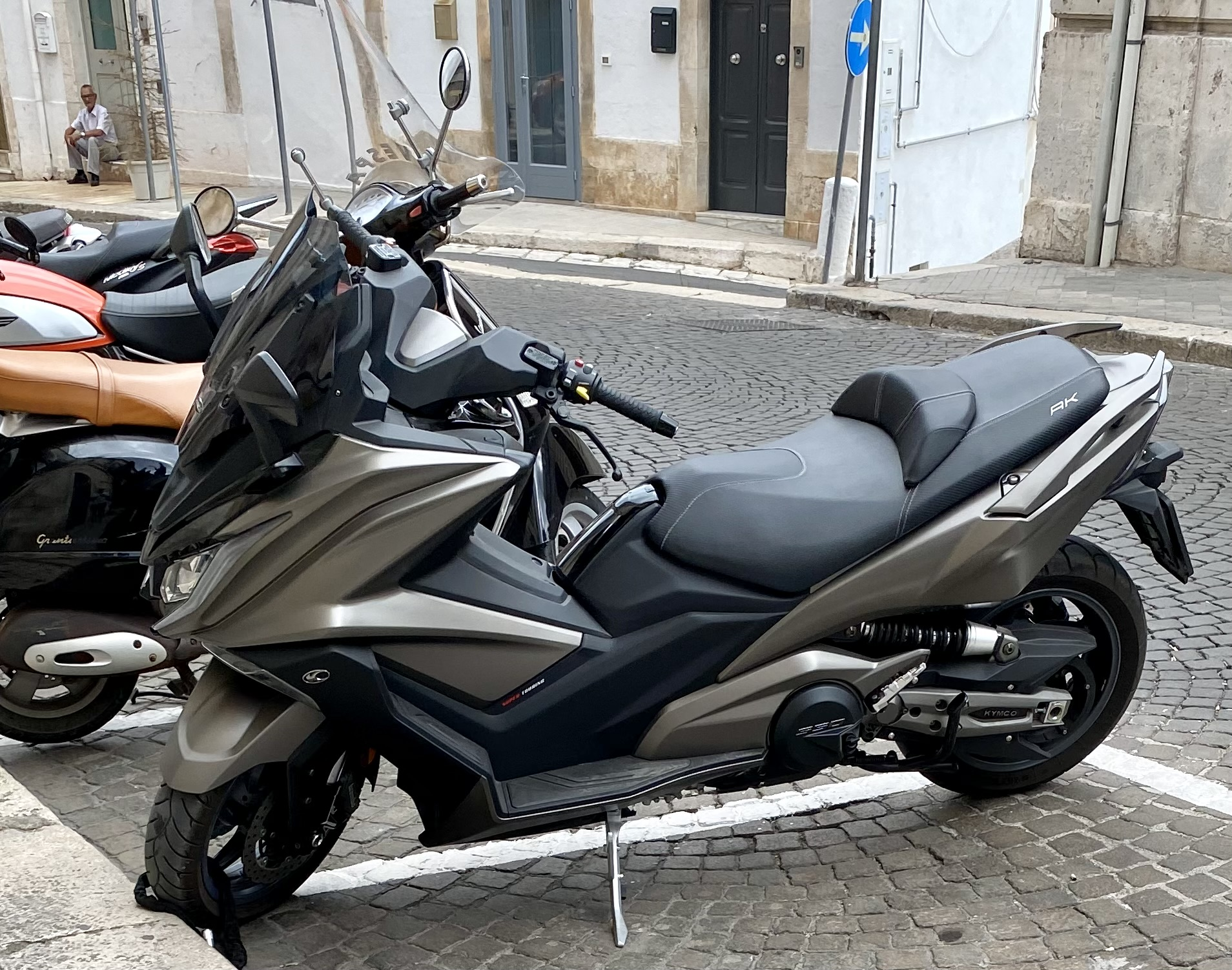
- AK550 ETS
- Manufacturer: Kwang Yang Motor Company, Ltd. (Kymco)
- Production: 2017–present
- Class: Scooter

The Kymco AK550 is a scooter produced by Taiwanese Kwang Yang Motor Company under the Kymco brand since 2017.

== History and description ==
Announced in March 2016 with the display of the Kymco K50 prototype at the Tokyo Motor Show, the presentation of the final model took place at Intermot 2016. The AK550 is the maxiscooter with a sporty design from the Taiwanese company offered only with a 550 twin-cylinder engine to compete directly with the Yamaha T-Max and the SYM Maxsym TL500. It was designed in close collaboration with the Italian Soluzioni Ingegneria.

The market launch took place in spring 2017.

The AK550 engine is a liquid-cooled, four-stroke, in-line twin-cylinder engine with 550.4 cc and Euro 4 approval that delivers 51 HP (37.5 kW) of maximum power at 7500 rpm and 51.5 Nm of maximum torque at 5750 rpm. The weight is 226 kg and the declared maximum speed is 161.7 km/h. It has two riding modes: Full Power and Rain Mode, the latter slightly reduces power and delivery. The frame is a perimeter made of aluminum with upside-down fork suspension (41 mm) at the front and a monoshock at the rear. The brakes are Brembo with 270 mm front discs with radial calipers, and a 260 mm rear disc. The ABS is Bosch 9.1. It has a two-position adjustable windshield, TFT screen with Noodoe connectivity with Bluetooth for phones, heated grips, full LED lights and keyless start.

In February 2020, the engine was boosted to 53.7 HP (39.5 kW) and 55 Nm of torque.

== AK550 ETS ==
In April 2021, the AK550 underwent a slight update in which the ETS, the Ride by Wire electronic accelerator control system, was introduced and the SBA1 engine debuted, which was Euro 5 approved and delivered 51 HP (37.5 kW) at 7,500 rpm. It is fitted with 15″ 5-spoke alloy wheels with 120/70-15 tyres at the front and 160/60-15 at the rear.

== AK550 Premium ==
The AK550 range was updated at the end of 2022 with the debut of the new variant called “Premium” which went on sale in spring 2023 and joined the "ETS" version. The AK550 Premium is a version designed for greater motorway comfort, it has the same frame and chassis as the AK550 ETA and stands out for its different specific body design: all the plastics are different and the front area is wider to better protect against aerodynamic noise at high speeds, larger LED headlights, higher electric windscreen, 15" five-spoke alloy wheels with 120/70-15 tyres at the front and 160/60-15 at the rear, new belt transmission with smaller dimensions. The AK550 Premium has a length of 2,000 mm, width of mm, height of 1,494 mm, wheelbase of 1,580 mm, dry weight of 238 kg mm and seat height of 790 mm. The engine is the twin-cylinder SBA1B 550 cc with 51 hp (37.5 kW) delivered at 7,500 rpm and 52.3 Nm of maximum torque at 5,750 rpm.
