= Daniela Kaneva =

Bulgarian journalist (1938–2025)

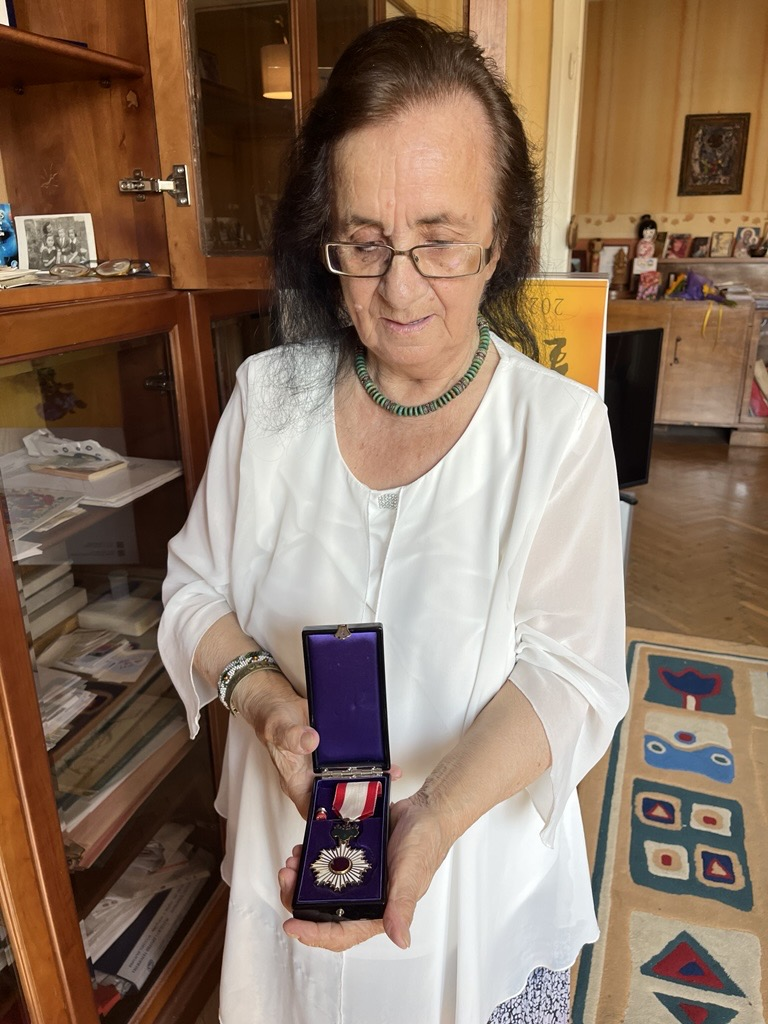
- Daniela Kaneva with her Order of the Rising Sun, Gold and Silver Rays.
- Born: August 22, 1938; Sofia, Kingdom of Bulgaria
- Died: 25 April 2025 (aged 86); Sofia, Bulgaria
- Occupation: Journalist
- Employer(s): Bulgarian National Television; Bulgarian Telegraph Agency

Daniela Kaneva (Bulgarian: Даниела Кънева; 22 August 1938 – 24 April 2025) was a Bulgarian journalist and international correspondent, regarded as a major figure in Bulgarian journalism.

Kaneva was a long-time reporter and correspondent for Bulgarian National Television (BNT), known for her work in Asia—reporting on events in Japan and India—as well as for a series of interviews with world leaders.

== Biography ==
Daniela Kaneva was born on 22 August 1938 in Sofia. Kaneva studied nuclear physics but graduated in English philology, and later completed studies in foreign trade and international relations at the University of London. She began teaching English in Sofia, yet soon turned to journalism and joined the Bulgarian Telegraph Agency (BTA). From 1970 to 1975 she became the first Bulgarian correspondent sent to Japan and the first foreign woman journalist officially accredited there. As a specialist in Indian and Japanese culture, she covered events in these countries for decades. Over the course of her career, she produced 110 documentaries, 25 of which were focused on Japan.

During her career, Kaneva interviewed numerous influential figures on the international stage. Among her most emblematic conversations were those with Indian Prime Minister Indira Gandhi; her son and later prime minister, Rajiv Gandhi; Soviet Foreign Minister Andrei Gromyko; the musician Ray Charles; and many others. Kaneva is believed to be the only journalist to have secured both the first and the last interview with Rajiv Gandhi. At her invitation, Ray Charles performed a concert in Sofia in the 1980s—a testament to the cultural impact Kaneva achieved through her work.

For decades, Kaneva reported from global hot spots for Bulgarian National Television—including regular appearances on the news programme "Po sveta i u nas"—and remained active in the profession until the end of her life. On 24 April 2025 she died at the age of 87, the news being announced by the team of the public broadcaster BNT.

== Recognition and awards ==
Daniela Kaneva is regarded as a pioneer of Bulgarian foreign journalism. For her role in strengthening relations between Bulgaria and Japan, she received the Japanese state decoration the Order of the Rising Sun, Gold and Silver Rays, in 2011. Later, in 2020, President Rumen Radev presented Kaneva with the President’s Honorary Badge for her outstanding contribution to Bulgarian journalism.

Daniela Kaneva was widely respected for her professionalism and dedication, and she was described in an obituary published by BNT as a "samurai of the word", whose voice and worldview inspired generations of Bulgarian journalists and viewers.
