= Kymco X-Town =

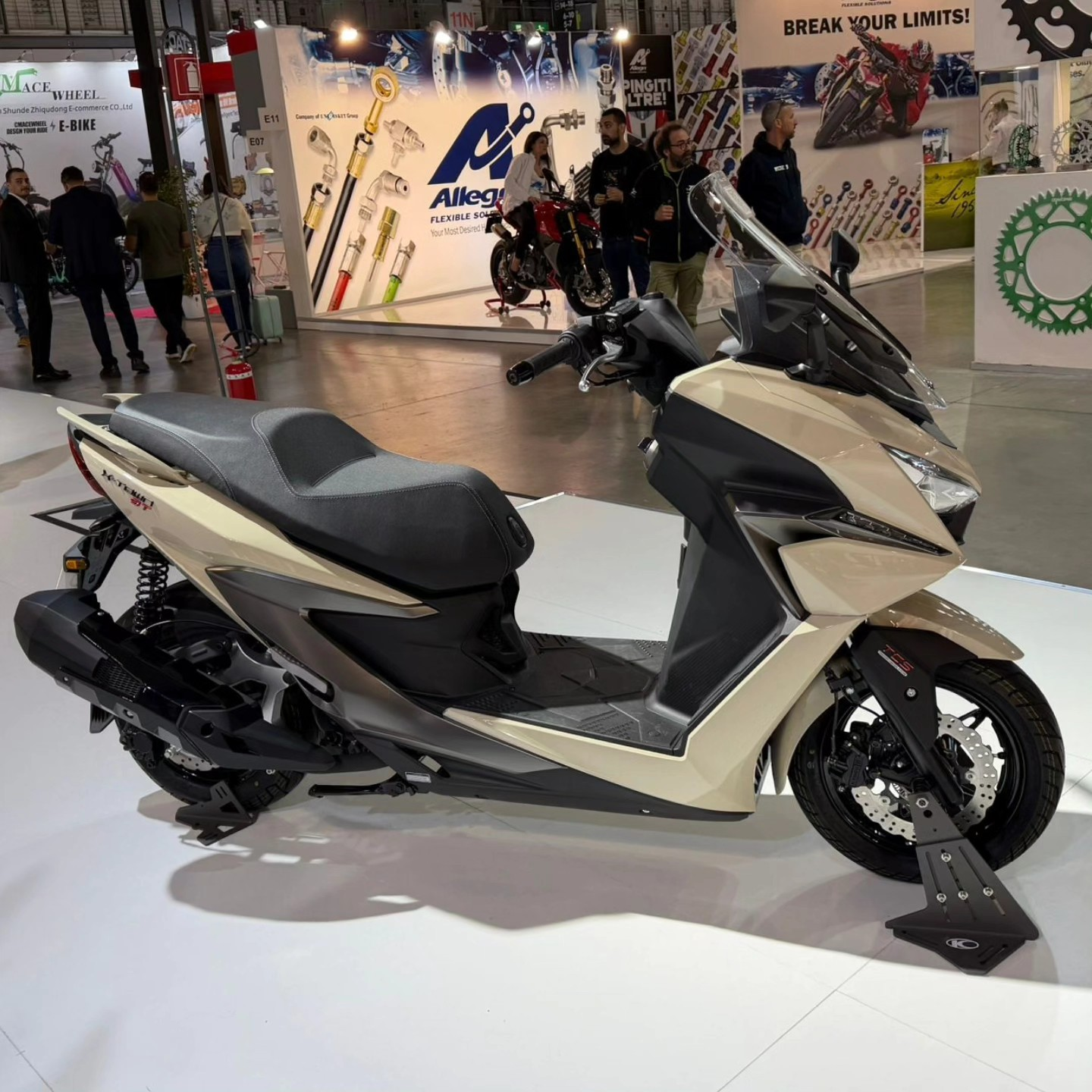
- 2026 Kymco X-Town ST 250i
- Manufacturer: Kwang Yang Motor Company, Ltd. (Kymco)
- Production: 2016-
- Class: Scooter

The Kymco X-Town is a scooter produced by Taiwanese Kwang Yang Motor Company under the Kymco brand.

== History and description ==
Presented at EICMA 2015, production of the X-Town scooter began in 2016.

The X-Town is a medium-compact range scooter with low wheels available in 125 cm^{3} and 300 cm^{3} displacements, both single-cylinder and four-stroke: the 125 delivers 12.9 HP while the 300 has a newly developed 276 cm^{3} effective engine, 2-valve, liquid-cooled delivering 24.5 HP at 7250 rpm. The engines are both Euro 4 approved. The tubular steel cradle frame has a 37 mm front fork and a single-sided rear suspension with two shock absorbers with adjustable preload. The front wheel is 14" with 120/80 rubber while the rear wheel is 13" with 150/70 tyres. The braking system consists of a 260 mm front disc with two-piston caliper and a 240 mm rear disc with two-piston caliper. ABS is available as standard only for the 300 cm^{3} version, while it is not available for the 125 which, however, mounts the combined CBS braking system.

== Variants and updates ==
In summer 2017, the range was updated and two new red colors were introduced: the matt Loveno red and the glossy Malaga red. In 2019, the X-Town CT (called in Italy X-Town City) was added to the range, a version that has a flat platform without a tunnel that guarantees greater comfort, and both 13" wheels. The engine range is the same as the classic X-Town. In 2021 it underwent an important update, with the adaptation of the engines to the Euro 5 standard.
