= Licker =

Licker may refer to:

- a person or animal engaged in licking
- Roland Licker (1932–1974), Luxembourgish canoeist
- Licker, a fictional zombie in Resident Evil

== See also ==
- Lick (disambiguation)
- Liquor (disambiguation)
- John Lickert (born 1960), baseball player
- Randolph Turpin, British boxer known as the Leamington Licker
