= Kymco People =

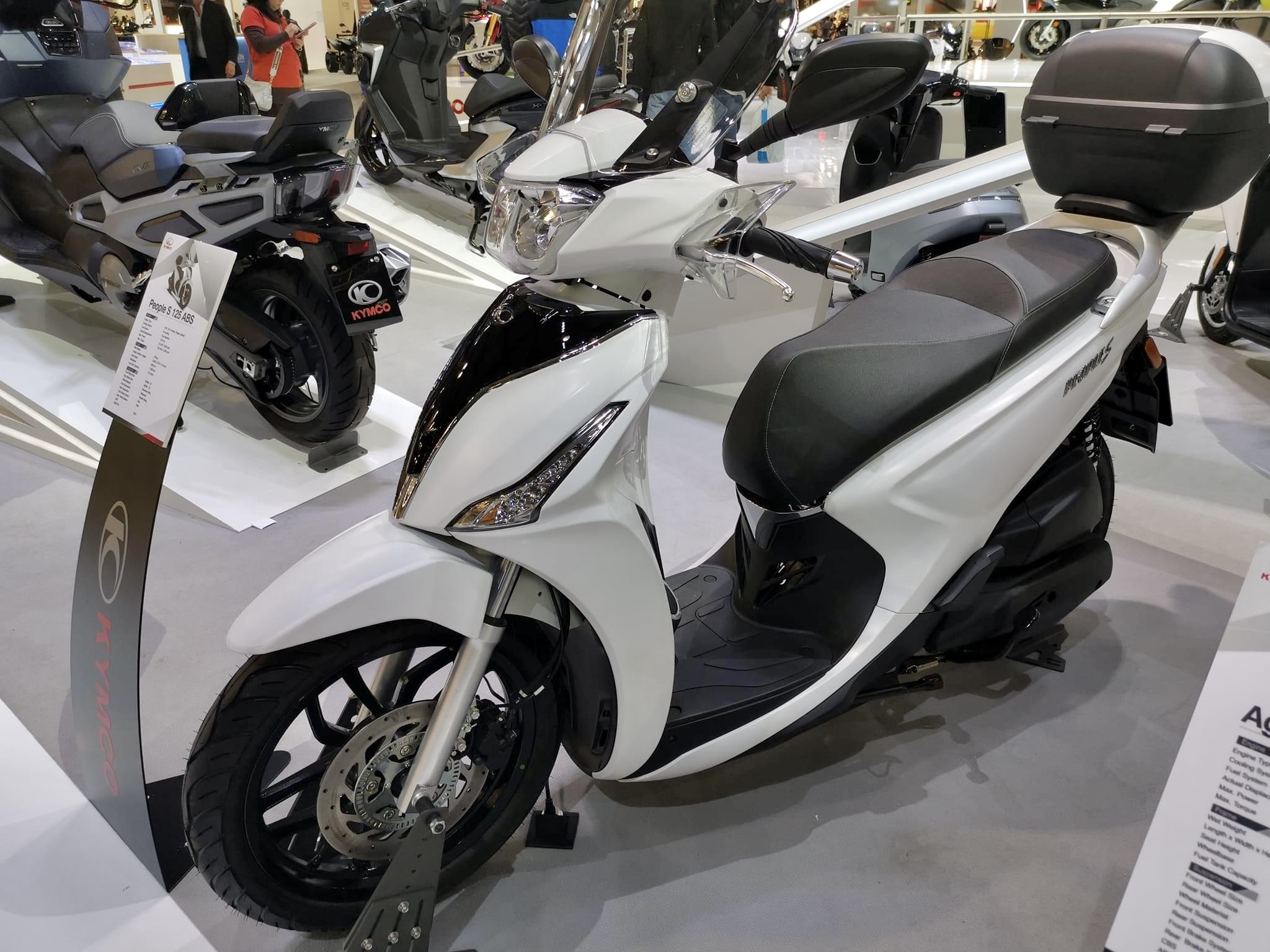
- Manufacturer: Kymco
- Also called: Kymco Looker
- Production: 1998–present
- Assembly: Taipei, Taiwan; Chongzhou, China
- Class: Scooter
- Engine: 50 cc (3.1 cu in); 125 cc (7.6 cu in); 150 cc (9.2 cu in); 250 cc (15 cu in)
- Ignition type: Capacitor discharge electronic ignition (CDI)
- Transmission: CVT automatic; gear final drive
- Frame type: Tubular steel spine
- Brakes: Front; disc Rear; expanding drum

The Kymco People is a two-wheeled scooter from the Taiwanese manufacturer Kymco.

== History ==
Designed by Massimo Zaniboni, director of Italian style centre Arkema Studio, the People was Kymco's first compact scooter with "high wheels" intended primarily for the European market competing with Aprilia Scarabeo, Piaggio Liberty, Malaguti Ciak and Honda SH.

It was presented at the Munich Intermot in 1998 and from the first months of 1999 it was put on sale in the main European markets. It is equipped with three engines: a two-stroke with 50 cm^{3} of displacement or a four-stroke engine of 125 cm^{3} and 150 cm^{3}. The cooling system is air-forced and has an electric start and kick starter. The colors available are: black, silver, anthracite, blue, gray, orange and red.

In 2008, the “Anniversary” version was presented to celebrate the ten years of the model.

In 2012 Kymco presented the successor, the People One, but the old People will remain in production until 2017 as it continued to enjoy good commercial success especially in Europe.

== Kymco People 250 ==
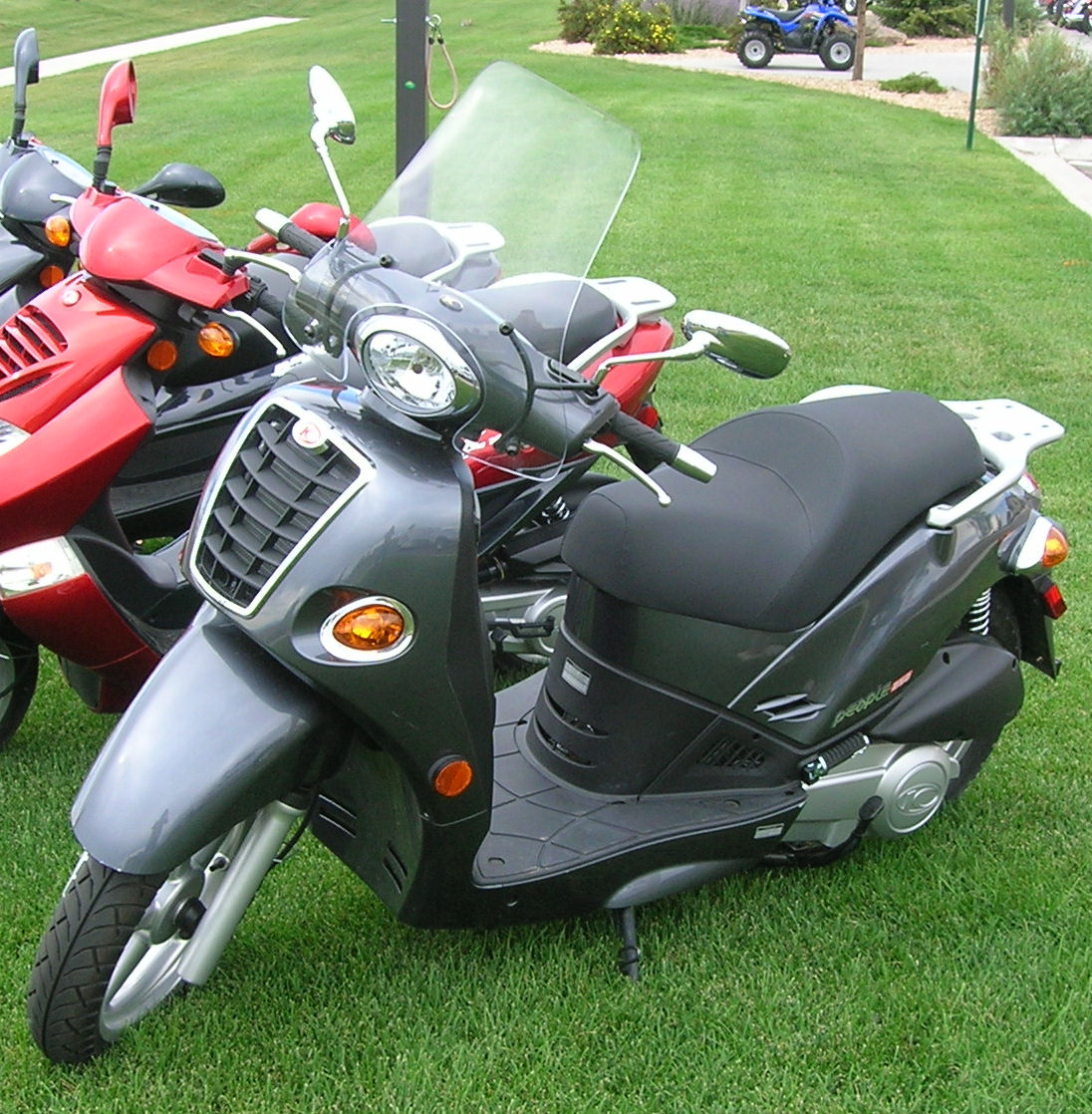
The People 250 has a specific chassis and design

Presented in prototype form at the Munich show in 2001 and subsequently at the EICMA show, the People 250 went into production in the early months of 2002 and positioned itself as the top model of the People range. Characterized by a specific "vintage" design, it has a specific chassis and frame to support the new engine.

The frame is made of steel tubes and has a fork with 37 mm diameter stems with an excursion of 115 mm, at the rear there is a pair of adjustable shock absorbers in spring preload and 105 mm excursion, the tires are 110/70 front and 140/70 rear with 16” 5-spoke wheels.

The engine is a liquid-cooled, single-cylinder 251 cm^{3} four-stroke engine that delivers 19.6 hp at 7250 rpm and 19.6 Nm of maximum torque at 6500 rpm. It is approved Euro 2.

In the spring of 2004 a slight restyling was presented which brought with it a new grille with chromed slats, a new saddle with better padding, the radiator air vents were redesigned and now adjustable and the set-up was improved by adopting new steering bearings and a different calibration. fork.

The 250 went out of production in 2008.

== Kymco People range ==
Over the years the People range has been enriched with numerous models: in addition to the People base, in 2005 the People S was presented, a more refined and expensive scooter.

In 2012 the People One went into production, direct heir to the People base launched in 1998. The People One is a cheap model of the range.

In 2010, the People GT was launched, a more expensive top-of-the-range model positioned higher than the People S.

- People S (from 2005)
- People GT (from 2010)
- People One (from 2012)
