= Licking River =

Licking River or North Fork Licking River may refer to:

- Licking River (Kentucky), a tributary of the Ohio River
  - with tributary North Fork Licking River (Kentucky)
- Licking River (Ohio), a tributary of the Muskingum River then the Ohio River
  - with tributary North Fork Licking River (Ohio)

== See also ==
- Licking Creek (disambiguation)
- Licking (disambiguation)
