= Liquor (disambiguation) =

Liquor is an alcoholic drink produced by distillation.

Liquor may also refer to:

- Liquor (novel series), a novel series by Poppy Z. Brite
- Liquor, a 2017 album by Lil Wyte
- Liquor (Lydia album), 2018
- "Liquor" (song), a 2015 song by Chris Brown
- A sauce served with Pie and mash
- The liquid produced from fermented tea leaves
- Liquor cerebrospinalis, cerebrospinal fluid
- Any industrial process fluid. For instance, wastewater within a treatment plant is referred to as "mixed liquor"
- George Liquor, fictional character

== See also ==
- Licker (disambiguation)
- Liqueur
- Liquor store
- Liquor license
- List of national liquors
- Flavored liquor
- Malt liquor
- Pot liquor
- Chocolate liquor
- Green liquor
- White liquor
- Black liquor
- Mother liquor
- Corn steep liquor
