= Liking =

Liking may refer to:

- A form of the English verb "like"
- Use of a like option on social networking and some other websites
- Reciprocal liking, a psychological phenomenon
- Likin (taxation), in 19th- and 20th-century China

== See also ==
- Like (disambiguation)
