= Bulgarian News Agency =

- Българска телеграфна агенция

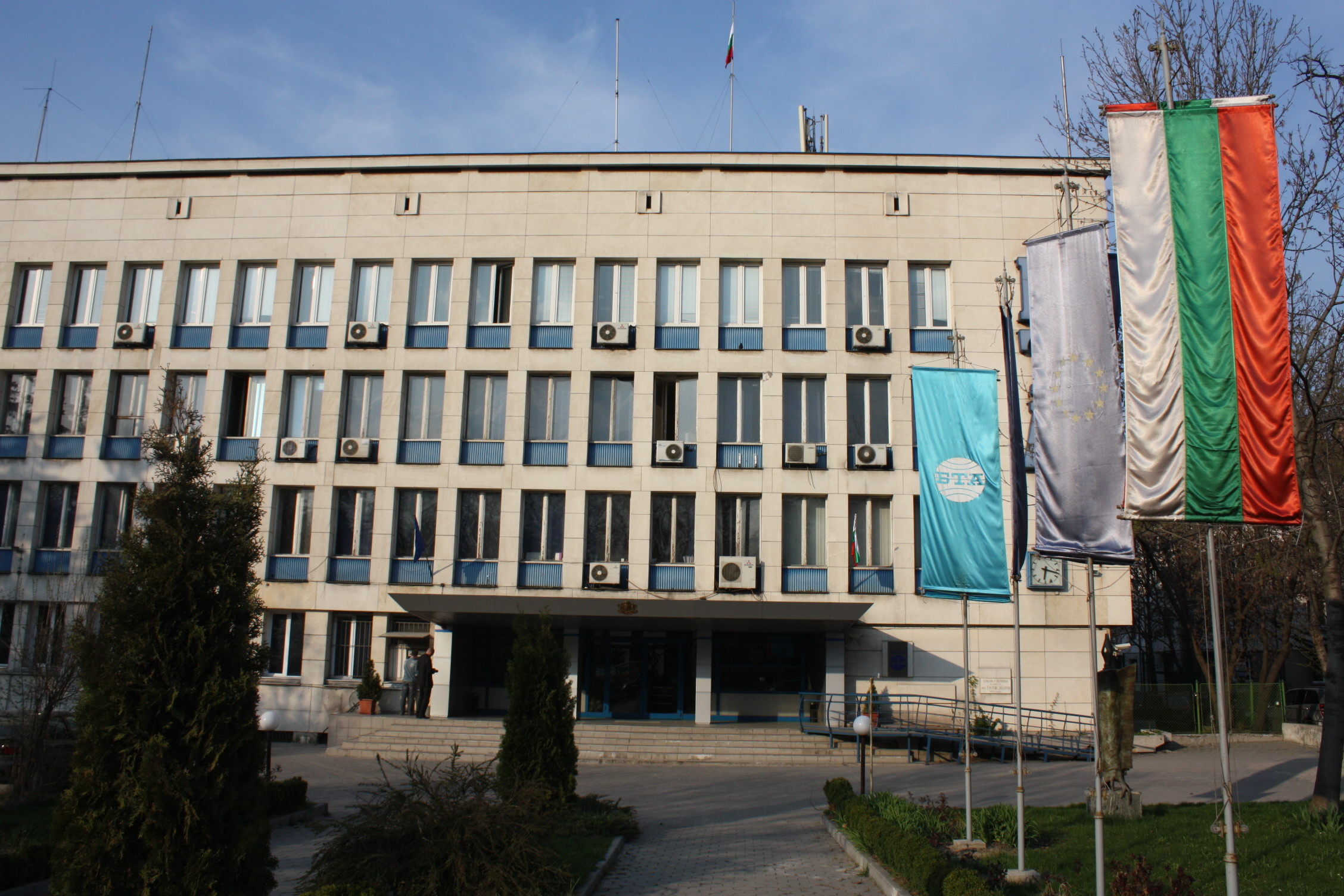
- BTA headquarters in Sofia, 49 Tsarigradsko shose
- Abbreviation: BTA (Bulgarian)
- Formation: 1898
- Location: Sofia, Bulgaria
- Director general: Kiril Valchev
- Website: www.bta.bg

The Bulgarian News Agency (Bulgarian: Българска телеграфна агенция, lit. 'Bulgarian Telegraph Agency', abbreviated БТА, BTA) is the national news agency of Bulgaria.

== History and profile ==
The BTA was founded in 1898 through a decree of Knyaz Ferdinand of Bulgaria during the government of Konstantin Stoilov.

It is the main source of information for the Bulgarian media and the country's governmental institutions. The agency's latest statute, regulating its activity, was adopted in 1994. The agency is a member of the European Alliance of News Agencies and of the Black Sea Association of National News Agencies. In addition, it is the founding member of the Balkan News Agencies.

The BTA issues Daily News, the only English-language Bulgarian daily, as well as the weekly Bulgarian Economic Outlook, also in English. In Bulgarian, the agency issues the established weekly magazine Paraleli, the monthly culture-related magazine LIK, and 100%.

Since February 2022, BTA’s news are free to use by all Bulgarian media outlets.

== See also ==
- Daniela Kaneva
