= Kymco Super 9 =

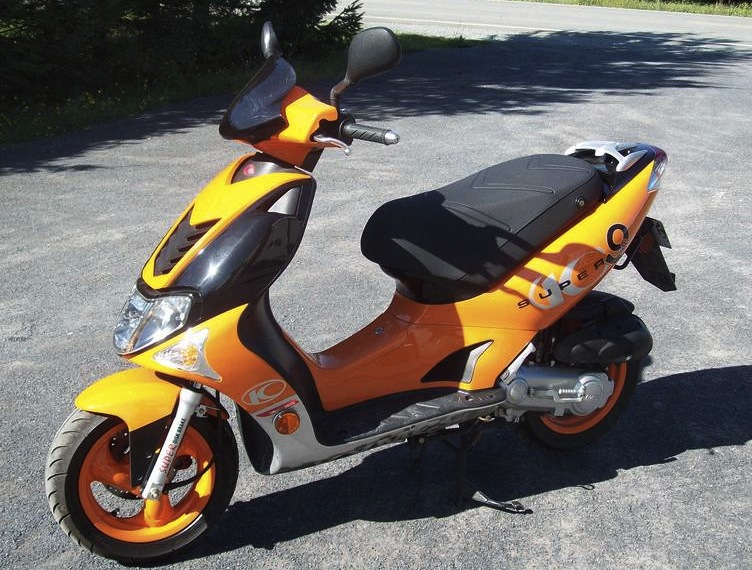
- Manufacturer: Kymco
- Engine: 50 cc (3.1 cu in) single cylinder two-stroke oil injected, electric and kick start
- Bore / stroke: 39 x 41.4 mm
- Power: 4 hp (3.0 kW) at 5,500 rpm
- Transmission: Automatic CVT
- Frame type: Steel
- Suspension: Telescoping fork, rear monoshock
- Brakes: Front: Twin-piston hydraulic disc Rear: disc (water-cooled version only), or drum
- Tires: Front: 120/70-12; Rear: 130/70-12
- Wheelbase: 1295 mm

The Super 9 is a lightweight scooter made by Kymco. It has modern performance styling, as opposed to the retro styling seen on many scooters. It can accommodate a rider and passenger, having aluminum passenger footpegs and a large seat. It has an underseat storage box for a full face helmet. It can reach about 80kmh in stock form. The engine design is based on Honda's AF18E/AF16E Dio motor.

The Super 9 is popular worldwide. It was sold in North America from 2003 to 2009 (Canada from 2005). When it failed to meet U.S. emissions regulations in 2008 it was replaced by the Super 8.

It is available in an air-cooled and a liquid-cooled version. The liquid-cooled version is highly sought after by scooter enthusiasts.
