= Li Ke (disambiguation) =

Li Ke (李恪; 619–653) was a Chinese imperial prince of the Tang Dynasty.

Li Ke may also refer to:

== People ==
- Li Ke (windsurfer) (李科; born 1969), Chinese Olympic windsurfer
- Li Ke (footballer) (李可; born 1993, also Νικόλας Χάρι Γεννάρης), British-born Greek-Chinese soccer player for China
- Li Ke (parasailor), Chinese sailor for China in Sailing at the 2008 Summer Paralympics
- Li Ke (born 1980), Chinese basketball player for China at the 2007 FIBA Asia Championship squads
- Li Ke (李克), Chinese politician and mayor of Zhengzhou
- Li Ke (李柯), also known as Stella Li, Chinese business executive working for BYD Company
- Li Ke (general) (里克; 7th century BC), a minister of the Jin Kingdom, who was involved in the Li Ji Unrest

=== Fictional characters ===
- Li Ke (李克), a fictional character from the 2008 Taiwanese TV show Hot Shot (TV series)
- Li Ke, a fictional character from the 2006 Taiwanese TV show Romance of Red Dust
- Li Ke, a fictional character from the 2011 Chinese film Love Is Not Blind

== See also ==
- Ke Li, Chinese freestyle skier who won a silver in aerials during the 2008–09 FIS Freestyle Skiing World Cup
- Like (disambiguation)
