= Kymco Quannon =

Kymco Quannon 125
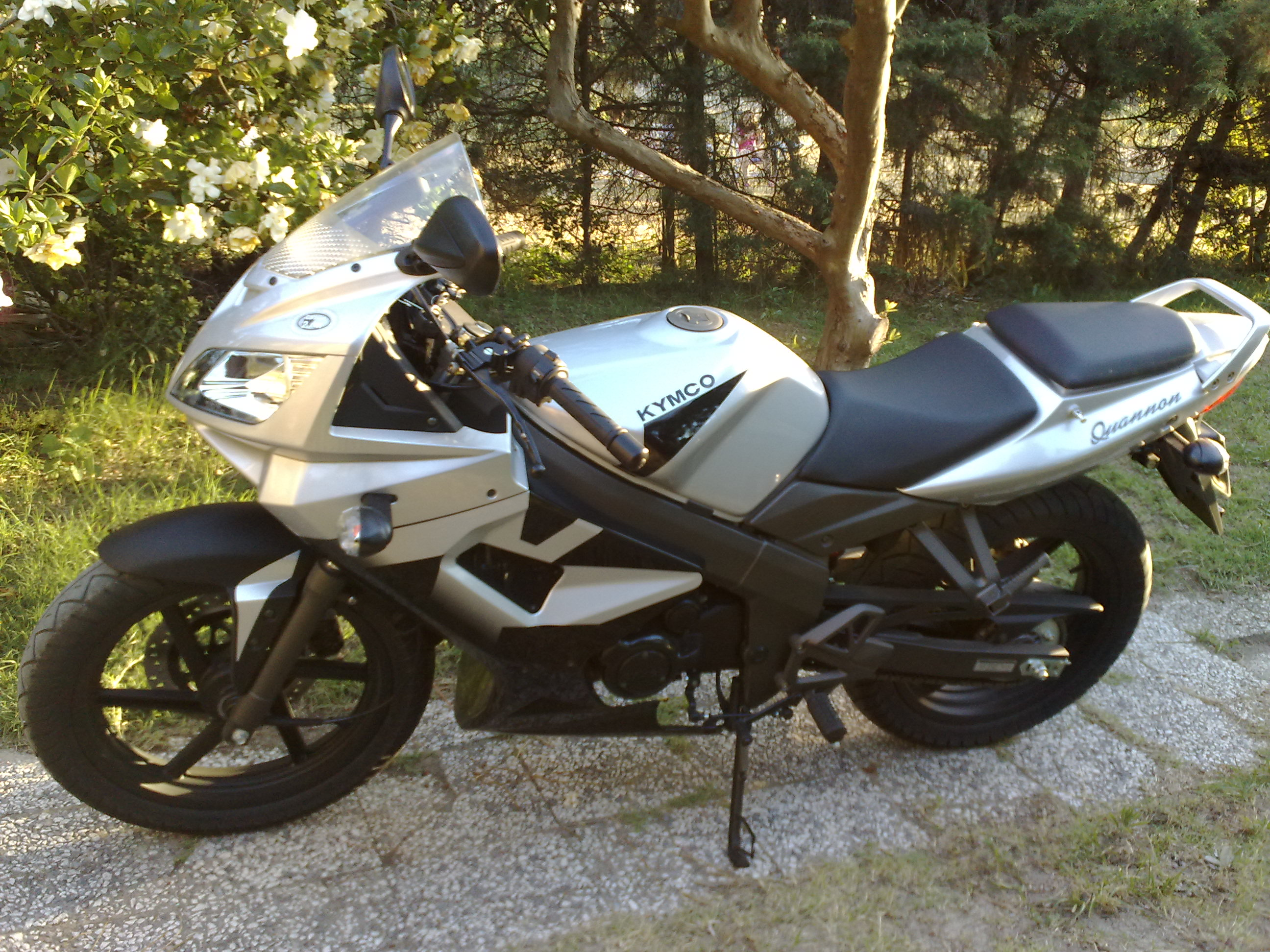
- Manufacturer: Kymco
- Also called: Kymco KR Sport
- Production: 1997–
- Class: Sport touring
- Engine: 4-stroke 124.1 cc, oil cooled, single cylinder, four valve SOHC, Keihin CVK carburetor
- Bore / stroke: 56.5 mm × 49.5 mm (2.22 in × 1.95 in)
- Compression ratio: 11:1
- Top speed: 130 km/h (81 mph)
- Power: 13 HP @ 9500 RPM
- Torque: 9.8 N·m @ 7500 RPM
- Ignition type: CDI + TPS
- Transmission: 5-gear, constant mesh, chain drive
- Frame type: Twin-spar steel tube
- Suspension: Front: 33 mm. Ø telescopic fork, 125 mm stroke Rear: Twin-sided swingarm 42.5 mm stroke
- Brakes: Front: 2-pot caliper on single 276 mm disc Rear: 2-pot caliper on single 220 mm disc
- Tires: Front: 110/80 R17; Rear: 140/70 R17
- Wheelbase: 1,355 millimetres (53.3 in)
- Dimensions: L: 2,057 millimetres (81.0 in); W: 725 millimetres (28.5 in); H: 1,174 millimetres (46.2 in)
- Seat height: 801 millimetres (31.5 in)
- Weight: 137 kilograms (302 lb) (dry)
- Fuel capacity: 13.5 liters (3.6 U.S. gal)
- Related: Kymco Quannon Naked, Kymco Quannon Fi

The Quannon (known as KR Sport in some countries) is Taiwanese motorcycle manufacturer Kymco's competitor to the 125 cc sports bike segment, a segment it shares with Honda's CBR125R.

== Engine ==
The engine in the Quannon is an improved version of the one featured in the Kymco Zing II. Being that the Zing is a cruiser-type bike, the engine had to undergo several modifications to fit a bike that intended to compete in the sports bike segment. The Quannon engine was thus fitted with a chain-driven overhead camshaft driving four valves instead of the pushrods that activated the two valves in the Zing's cylinder. This, together with various modifications to the ignition, exhaust and distribution system, increased the engine's power output by a little over 2 HP (from 10.8 HP in the Zing). The new intended operating regime for the bike also required the addition of an oil cooling system to help cope with the higher rev operation. The engine in the Quannon also includes a secondary air injection system, called SAS (Secondary Air System) by Kymco, which together with a catalytic converter allows the Quannon to comply with EURO3 European emission standards, a requirement for its commercialization in that region.

== Variants ==
=== Quannon 150 ===
A 150 cc (62 mm×49.5 mm, 149.4 cc) version of the bike was released in primarily in the US and some other selected markets, featuring an extra HP compared to the 125 cc version, taking it to 14 HP. While the 125 cc model did not get official distribution in the United States, being mainly sold in Europe, the 150 cc was brought to the U.S. market in the form of the Kymco Quannon 150 for 2010. Sales were very poor for this variant and it was quickly discontinued. Therefore, the 2010 model was the only year that the Quannon was sold in the U.S.

=== Quannon Naked ===
In October 2008, a 125 cc naked version called Quannon Naked was made available. The naked version of the bike has been revised in several aspects compared to the original, and now features an aluminum frame which, at 8.9 kg, is 30% lighter than its steel counterpart. The front suspension is also made of aluminum now, and its diameter was increased from 33 to 37 mm. The fuel tank capacity was also increased by 1.5 liters, bringing it to 15 liters. As far as performance goes, the gear ratios were revised, accounting for a shorter first gear, and the rev limit was raised from 10,000 to 12,001 RPM. Also, the air filter intake was modified to make it more silent, and the exhaust has been redesigned and is now divided into two segments, which should make it easier to install an aftermarket replacement. All new are the single headlight and reworked instruments panel, which is now fully digital, sporting dual LCD screens.

=== Quannon 150 Fi ===
A new version of the Quannon 150, named Quannon 150 Fi is also available, which features fuel injection like its competitor, the CBR125R.
