= Lick granuloma =

- Other names: Acral lick dermatitis
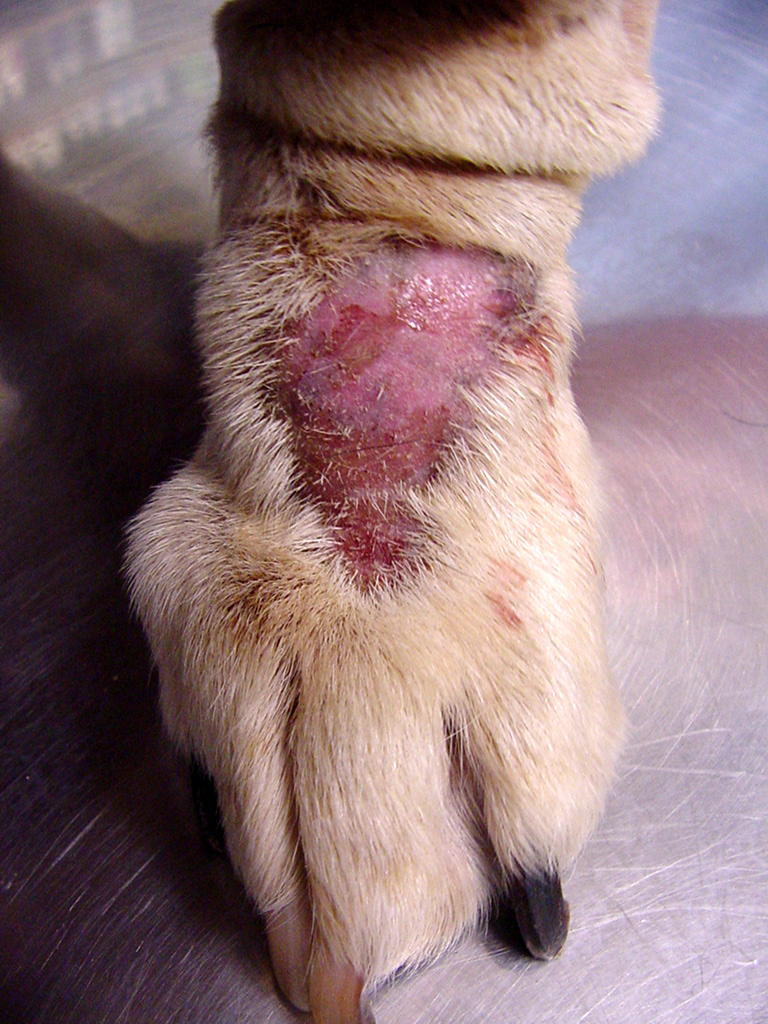
- Canine lick granuloma is a self-inflicted lesion often complicated by secondary infection.
- Specialty: Veterinary medicine

A lick granuloma, also known as acral lick dermatitis, is a skin disorder found most commonly in dogs, but also in cats. In dogs, it results typically from the dog's urge to lick the lower portion of one of their legs.

The lesion can initially be red, swollen, irritated, and bleeding, similar to a hot spot (wet eczema). The animal's incessant licking of the lesion eventually results in a thickened, firm, oval plaque, which is the granuloma.

A major cause of lick granuloma appears to be psychological, related to stress, anxiety, separation anxiety, boredom, or compulsiveness. Lick granulomas are especially seen in active dogs left alone for long periods of time.

One theory about the cause of lick granulomas is that excessive licking causes endorphin release, which reduces pain and makes the animal feel comfort temporarily.

Other triggers include itchy skin, painful conditions caused by trauma to the skin, arthritis, neuralgia, and peripheral neuropathy. A bacterial or fungal infection of the skin can also trigger itching, as can skin mites, allergies, a reaction to an environmental irritant or toxin, hyperthyroidism, and certain types of cancer.

Treatment of the primary cause, if known, is essential. In psychogenic cases, psychological factors should be identified and addressed, such as being left alone all day, being confined, and changes in the household.

== Signs and symptoms ==
Lick granuloma is a form of self-trauma and skin disorder in which most commonly dogs, but also cats, continuously lick a small area of their body until it becomes raw and inflamed. The most common areas affected are the lower (distal) portions of their legs, such as the carpus (wrist), or sometimes another part of their body such as the base of their tail.

Seventy percent of the time it occurs on one of the dog's left legs.The lesion can initially be red, shiny, swollen, hairless, irritated, and bleeding, similar to a hot spot (wet eczema). Eventually, a raised hard plaque forms.

Frequent formations of lick granulomas in the same area due to the constant licking will cause hardening, callous formation, hair loss (the hair may stop growing back), and hyperpigmentation to that area.Lick granulomas sometimes become infected with bacteria, causing abscessed areas or fistulous tracts (furuncles).

== Causes ==
Lick granulomas are caused by a variety of factors. One common cause of lick granulomas appears to be psychological, related to stress, anxiety, separation anxiety, boredom, or compulsiveness. Lick granulomas are especially seen in large active dogs left alone for long periods of time. It is often considered to be a form of canine obsessive-compulsive disorder.

Other causes include bacterial or fungal infections, ectoparasites, metabolic disease, neoplastic disease, trauma causing nerve damage, allergies, or joint disease. Hot spots may also lead to the formation of lick granulomas.

Arthritic and mobility problems in older dogs give them more time to lick and over-groom themselves.The condition becomes a vicious cycle – erosion of the skin from licking leads to pain and itching, which leads to more licking.

== Treatment ==
=== Of primary cause ===
Treatment of the primary cause, if known, is essential.

In psychogenic cases, dealing with psychological factors is most important. Factors should be identified such as being left alone all day, being confined, and changes in the household. Correction of these causes may include increased walks, avoiding confinement, and more interaction in the home. Some veterinarians have proposed that diet can affect compulsive behaviors in dogs.

Drugs may be used until behavior modification has had time to take effect. Antidepressants are most commonly used, including doxepin, amitriptyline, fluoxetine, and clomipramine. If the psychological factors are not corrected, the pet will usually relapse after the drugs are discontinued. Endorphin blockers such as naltrexone can be used to reduce addiction to licking, or endorphin substitutes such as hydrocodone may decrease the urge to lick.

The animal should be tested for allergies, and treated accordingly if positive (fatty acids, antihistamines, hypoallergic diet, etc.). It may also be necessary to check thyroid levels, as hypothyroidism seems to play a role in some cases, particularly in black Labrador retrievers; thyroid medication often will resolve the problem if it is due to hypothyroidism.

=== Of lesion ===
The lesion should also be treated.Class 4 infrared laser treatments have been used with much success, although it may take several treatments to achieve the desired outcome.

Licking can be prevented by the use of Elizabethan collars, dog leggings, battery-enhanced wraps, bandages, anti-licking ointments (which are bad tasting), and anti-lick strips (which are either bad tasting or simply provide a barrier). It is important to catch lesions early and keep the animal from licking them to then reduce inflammation and development of a habit. Topical medications such as corticosteroids or DMSO may be effective if used early.

Small lesions may be injected with triamcinolone or methylprednisolone. Oral antibiotics are used to control infection. Surgery may be performed to remove whole lesions, but there is risk of continued self-mutilation to the area afterwards. Other potential treatments include cryosurgery, laser surgery, radiation therapy, and acupuncture. Many dogs will lick at another leg, another area on the same leg, or someplace else, creating a new lick granuloma, if they are prevented from licking at the original one while it heals.

=== Success rate ===
Overall, lick granulomas are very difficult to treat, with control only being achieved in about 65 percent of cases. Some animals will continue to lick at the area despite the use of anti-lick ointments or sprays to deter them, for instance.

== Commonly affected dog breeds ==
Many large breed dogs appear to be predisposed, as well as golden retrievers and other bird dogs. Most of the dogs with the condition are over five years of age.

- Airedale Terrier
- Boxer
- Doberman
- German Shepherd
- Golden Retriever
- Great Dane
- Irish Setter
- Labrador Retriever
- Weimaraner
