= Lick (surname) =

Lick is a surname. Notable people with the surname include:

- Dennis Lick (born 1954), American football player
- James Lick (1796–1876), American real estate investor, carpenter, piano builder, land baron, and patron of the sciences
