= LIK (magazine) =

Bulgarian monthly magazine

Literatura, Izkustvo i Kultura
- Native name: Bulgarian: Литература, изкуство и култура
- Editor-in-chief: Georgi Lozanov
- Managing editor: Yanitsa Hristova
- Categories: Arts, Literature, Culture
- Frequency: Monthly
- Publisher: Kiril Valchev
- First issue: January 8, 1965; 61 years ago
- Company: Bulgarian News Agency
- Country: Bulgaria
- Based in: Sofia
- Language: Bulgarian
- Website: bta.bg/en/lik-magazine
- ISSN: 0324-0444
- OCLC: 31150854

Literatura, Izkustvo i Kultura (Bulgarian: Литература, изкуство и култура "Literature, Art and Culture"), abbreviated to LIK (ЛИК which, as a word on its own also means "image, portrait, likeness") is a monthly magazine covering its eponymous topics, published by the Bulgarian News Agency. The magazine was formerly published on a weekly basis. Its headquarters is in Sofia.
