= Licking Creek =

Licking Creek may refer to:

- Licking Creek (Potomac River), a stream in Pennsylvania
- Licking Creek (West Virginia), a stream in West Virginia
- Licking Creek Township, Fulton County, Pennsylvania

== See also ==
- Licking River (disambiguation)
