= Lick High School =

Lick High School may refer to:

- James Lick High School
- Lick-Wilmerding High School
