= Kymco =

Taiwanese motorcycle manufacturer

Kymco, Ltd
- Type: Private
- Industry: Powersports
- Founded: 1963; 63 years ago
- Headquarters: Kaohsiung, Taiwan
- Products: Motorcycles, Scooters, ATVs
- Website: www.kymco.com

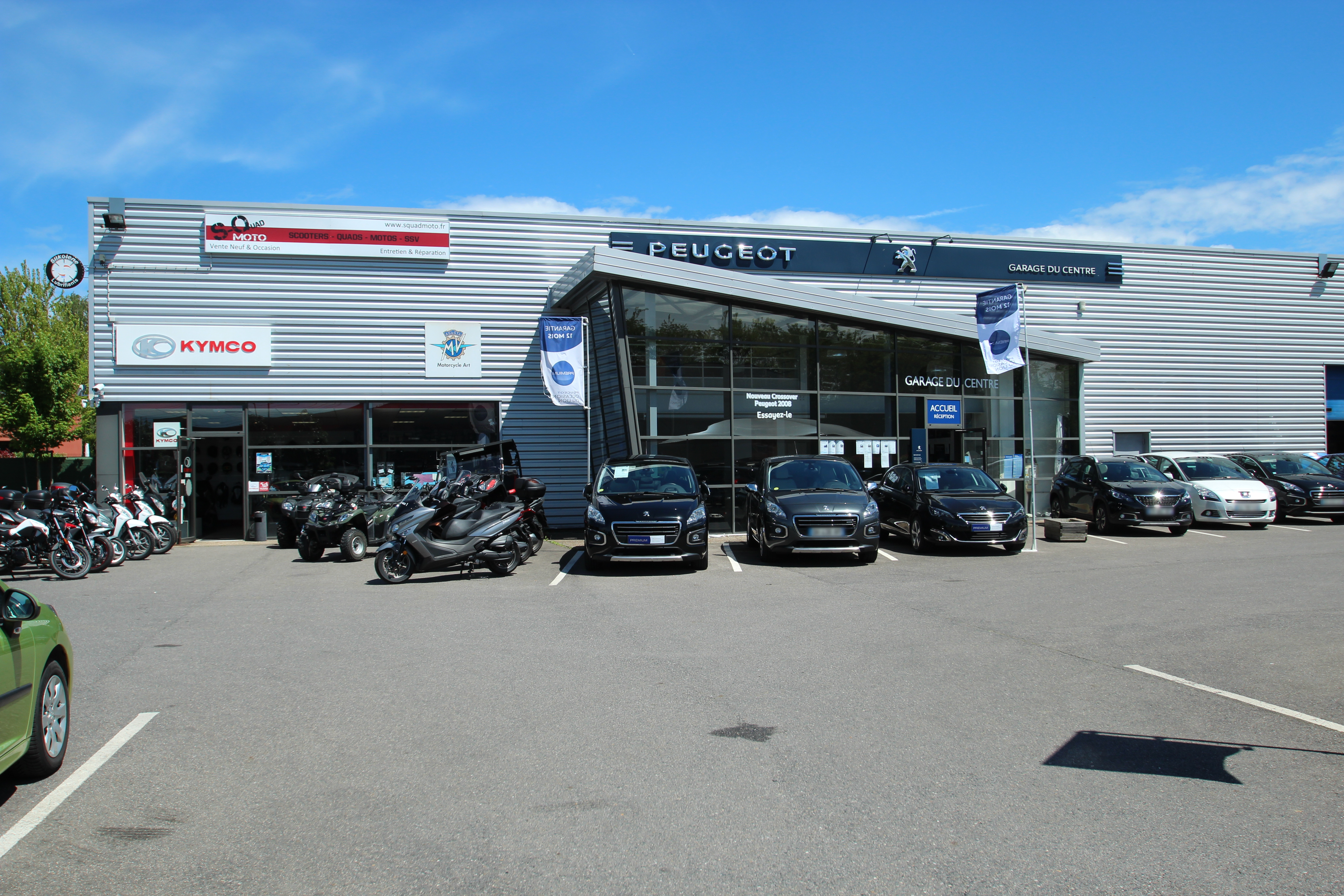
Kymco dealership in France

Kymco (an acronym for Kwang Yang Motor Co, Ltd (Chinese: 光陽工業; pinyin: Guāngyáng Gōngyè)) (stylized as KYMCO) is a Taiwanese motorcycle manufacturer headquartered in Kaohsiung, Taiwan. With approximately 3000 employees, Kymco produces over 570,000 vehicles annually at its factory in Kaohsiung. The company also has production facilities in Indonesia, Malaysia, the Philippines, PR China and Turkey.

== History ==
The company was founded in 1963. KYMCO originally made parts for Honda. The company built its first complete scooter in 1970 and began marketing under the "KYMCO" brand name in 1992. In the 2000s, Kymco became the largest scooter manufacturer in Taiwan, and the fifth largest scooter manufacturer worldwide. In early 2008, KYMCO was chosen by BMW to supply the engines for their G450 X Enduro bike. The optional range extender in the BMW i3 is also supplied by Kymco. In late 2013, Kawasaki announced that their new J300 scooter is manufactured in partnership with Kymco. It is based on a Kymco Downtown 300i.

== Products ==
=== Scooters ===
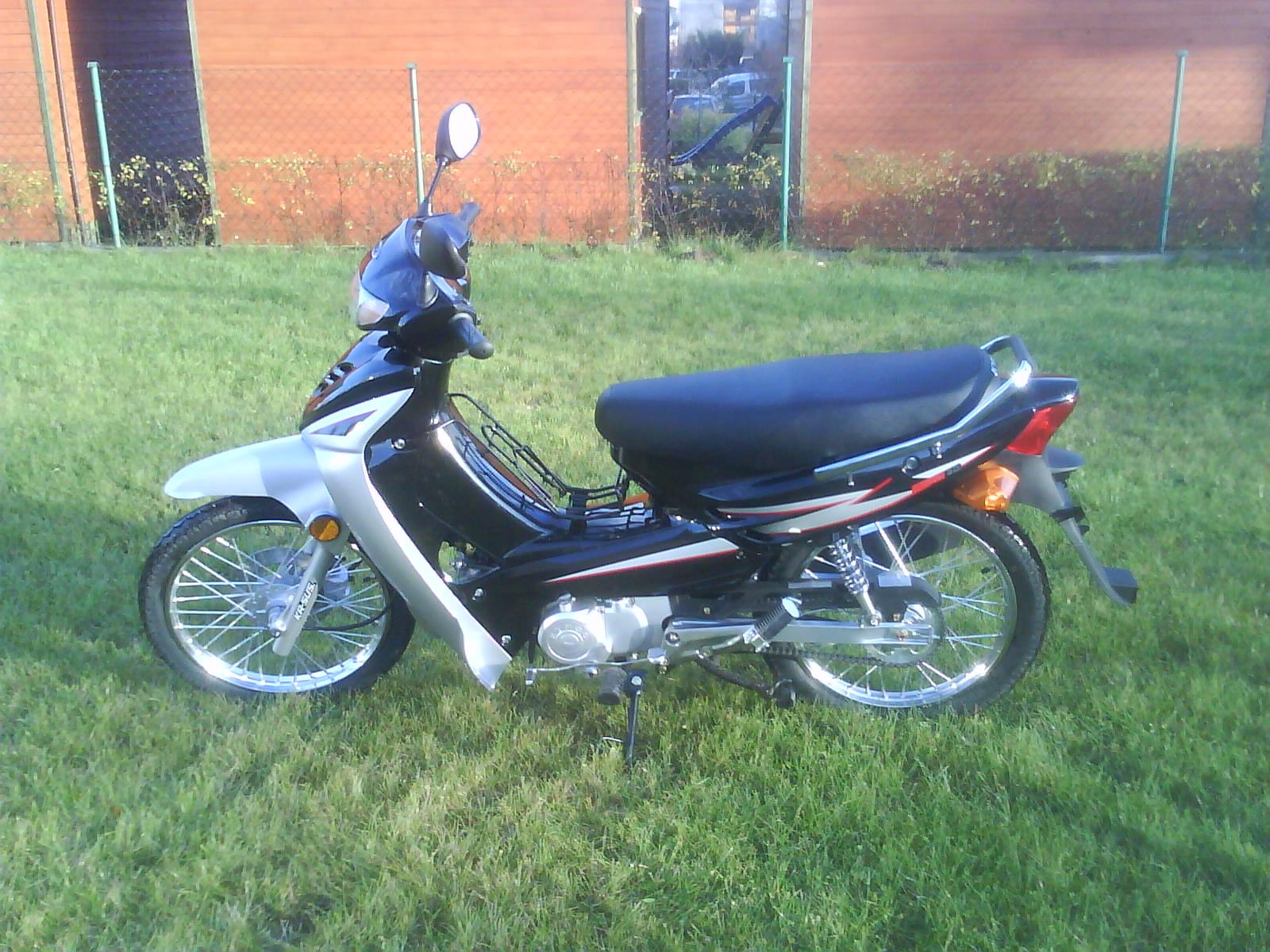
Kymco Activ

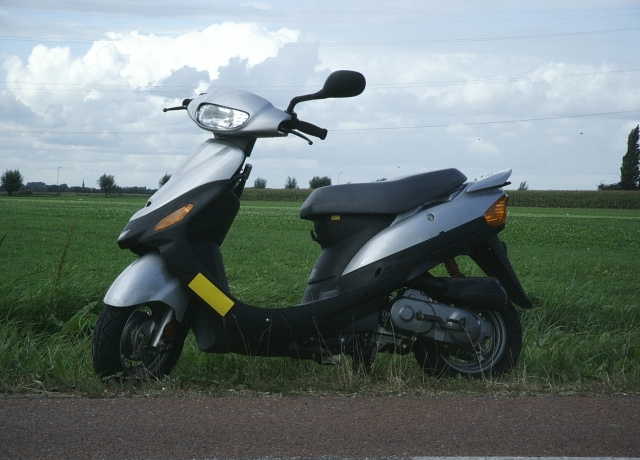
Kymco Filly 50

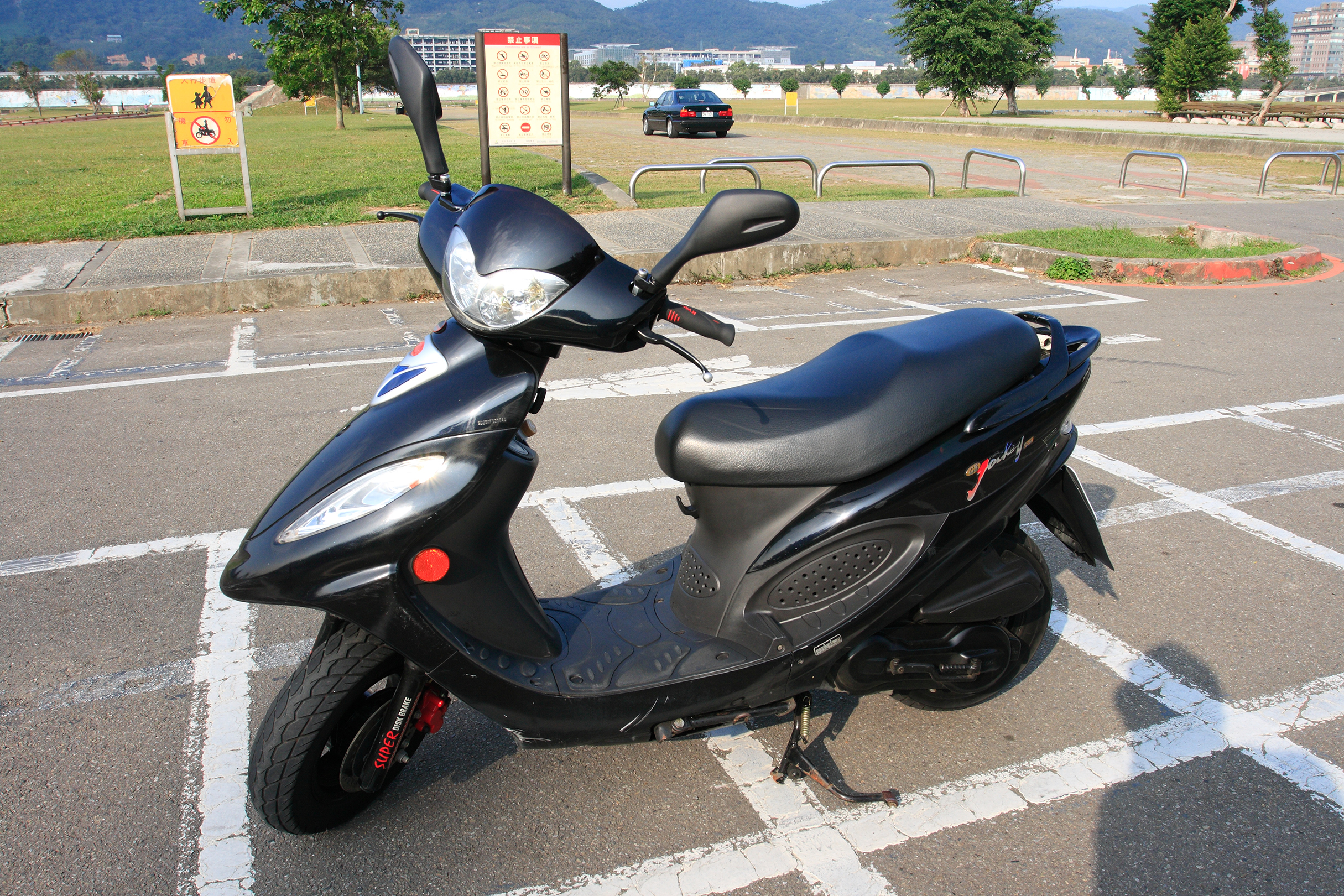
Kymco G3

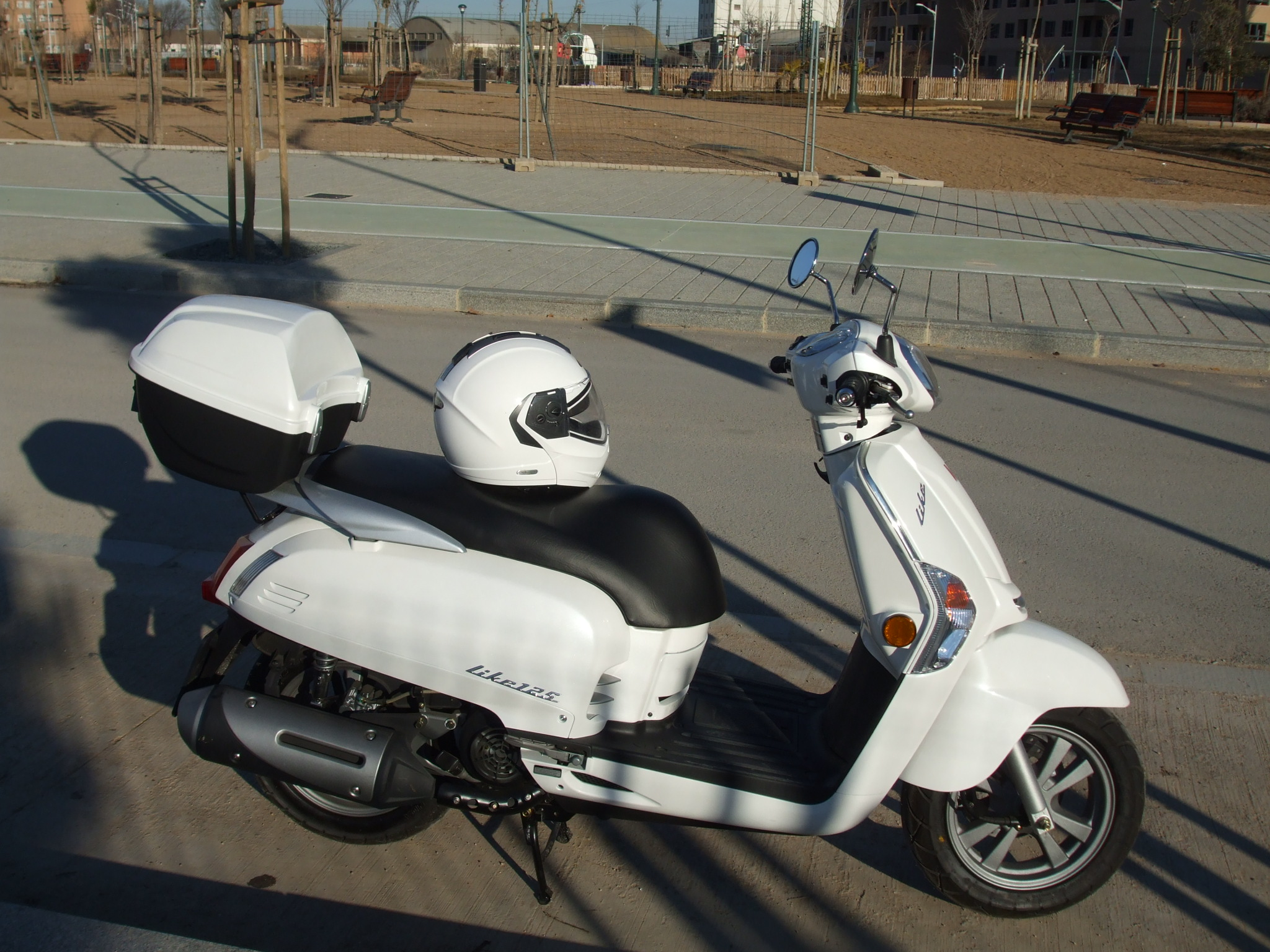
Kymco Like 125

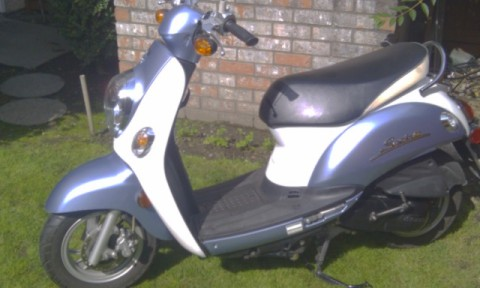
2009 Kymco Sento 50cc/100cc

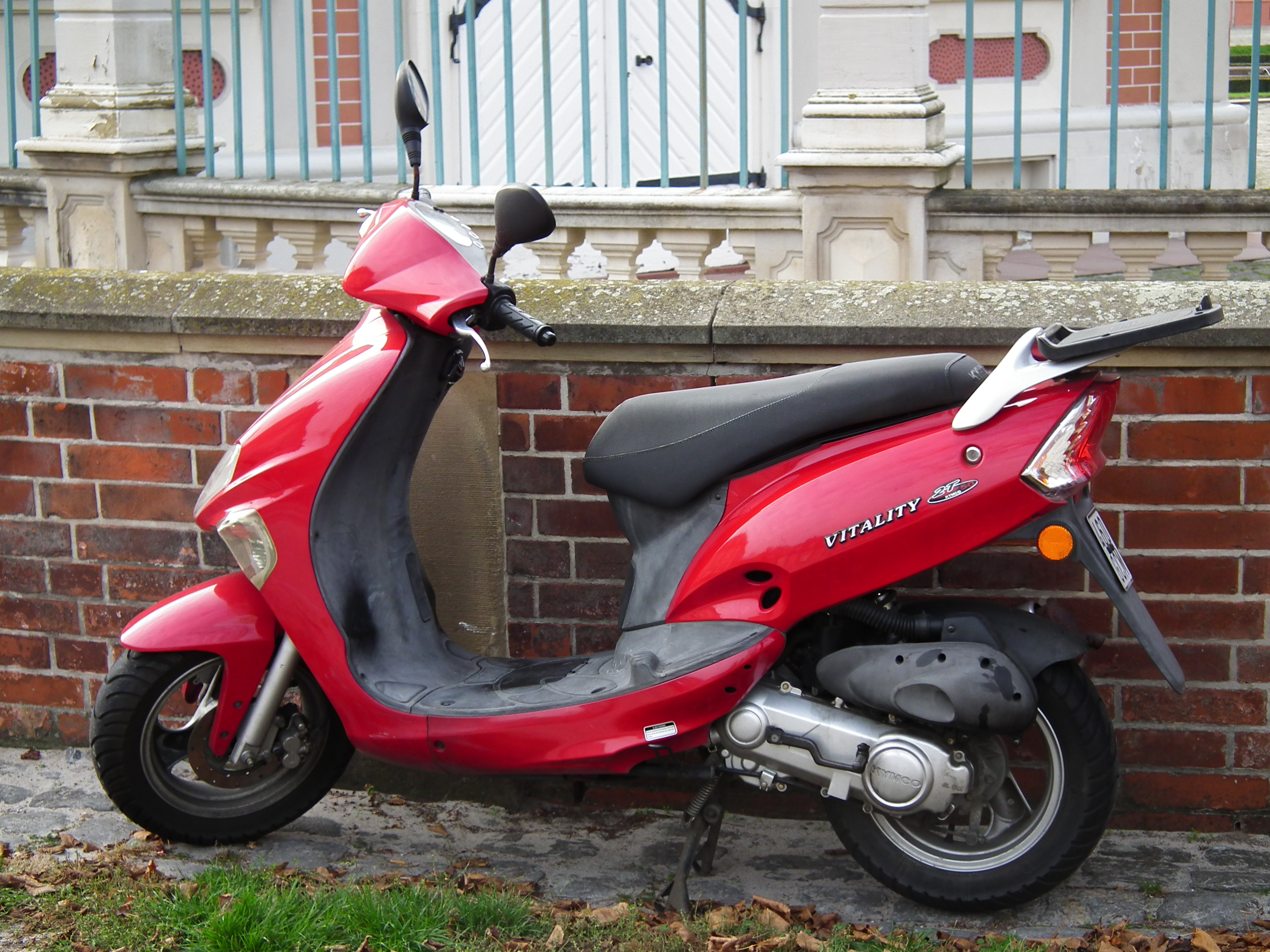
Kymco Vitality

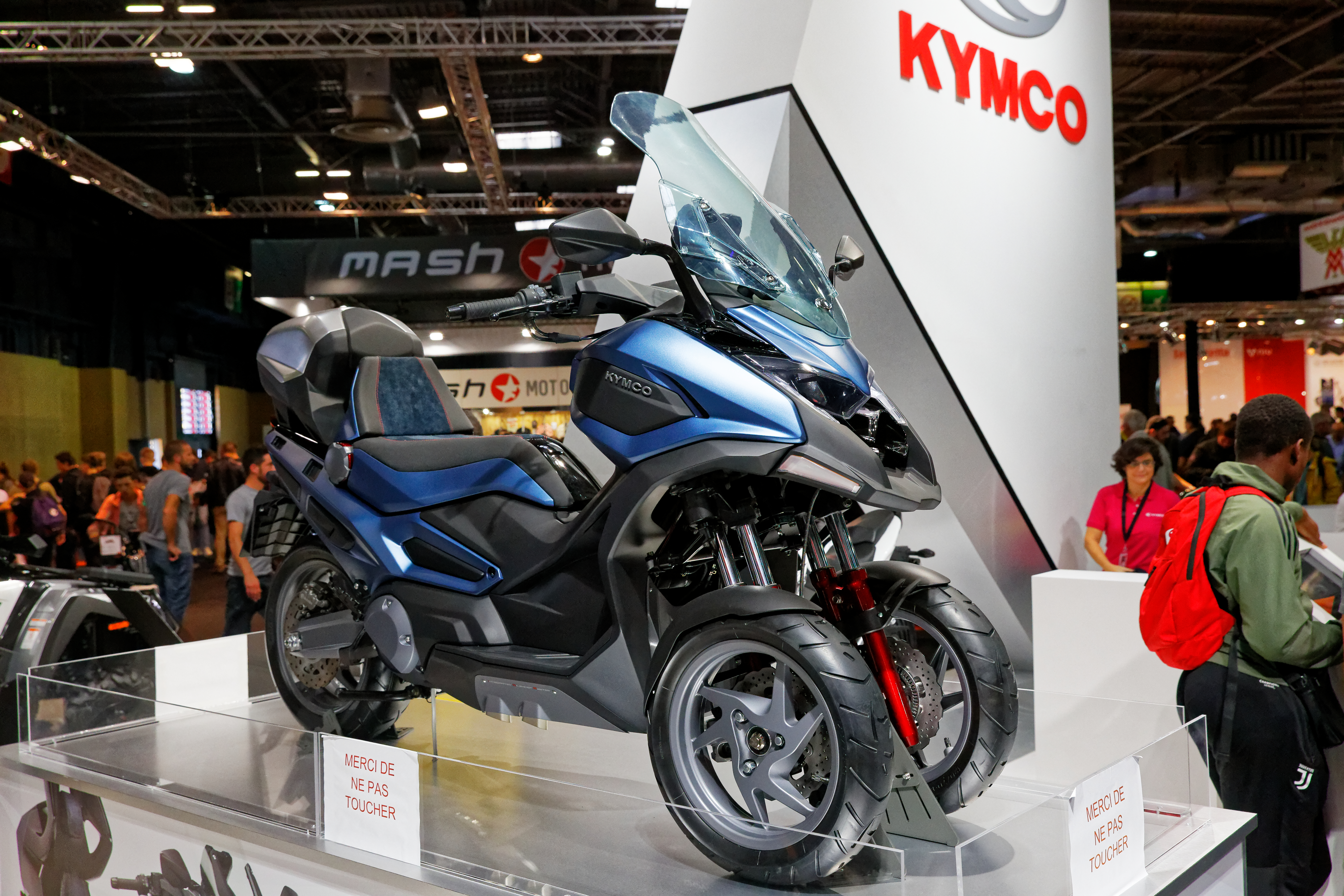
Kymco CV 3 550i

- 150XLS
- Activ 50/125
- Agility 50/125
- Agility City A/C 125/150/200
- Agility 16+ 300I
- KB 50
- CV 3 550i
- AK550
- Bet & Win 50/125/150/250 (also known as Ego)
- Caro 100
- Cherry 50/100
- Cobra Cross 50
- Cobra Racer 50/100
- Compagno 110i
- Dink 50 A/C
- Dink L/C
- Dink/Yager 125
- Dink 150/200
- DJ 50 S
- Downtown 125i/200i/250i/300i/350i
- Nikita 300/125 (known as Downtown in the U.S., Canada and Europe)
- Easy 100 (also known as Free LX 100/110)
- Ego 125
- Espresso 150
- Famous 110
- Filly 50LX
- G3
- Grand Dink (known as Grand Vista in the U.S. and the Frost in Canada) 125/150/250
- Heroism 125/150-豪邁
- Jockey 125
- Like 50/125/200i/200i XL/125 EV
- Miler 125
- Movie 50
- Movie XL 125/150
- MyRoad 700i
- New Sento 110cc
- People 50
- People S 50
- People 125
- People S 125
- People 150
- People S 200
- People S 200 i
- People 250
- People S 250
- People S 250i
- People S 300i >2008
- People GT 200i/300i
- People One 125i
- Sento 50
- Sento 100
- Sooner 100
- Super 8 125/150
- Super 9
- Top Boy 50 On/Off Road
- V-Link
- Vitality 50 (2 stroke and 4 stroke models)
- Vivio 125
- VJR 125
- Xciting 250/300/300 Ri/400I/500/500 Ri
- X-Town 300i
- Yager 125
- Yager GT 125
- Yager GT 200i
- Yup 50/250
- ZX 50
- Skytown 125/150
- i-One Air
- i-One Fly
- Agility Carry EV
- iOneX Super 6
- iOneX Super 7
- S6
- S7
- S7R
- MiCare 125
- i-One
- i-One DX
- Many 110 EV
- Nice 100 EV
- Like 125 EV

=== Motorcycles ===
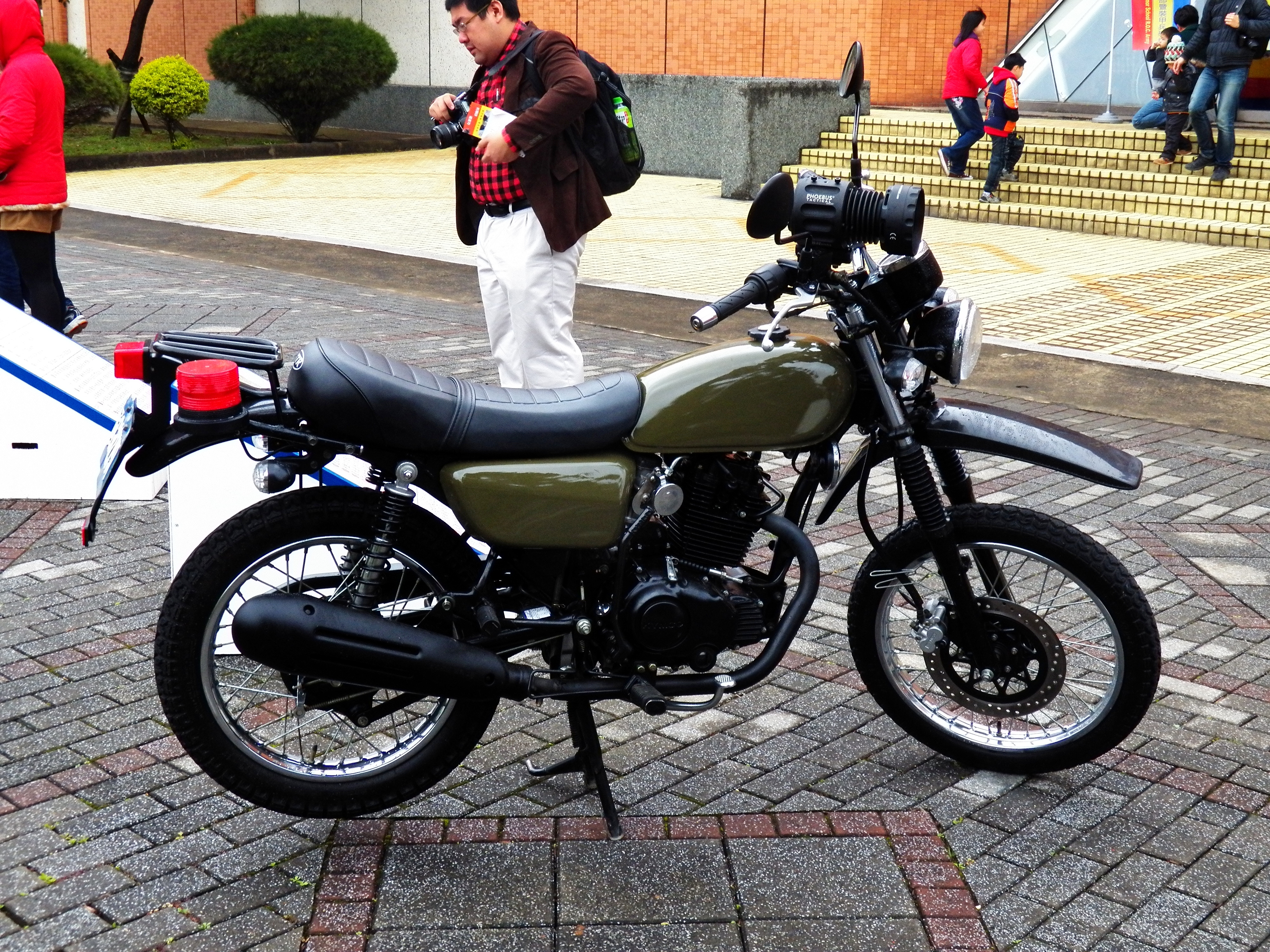
Kymco KTR 125

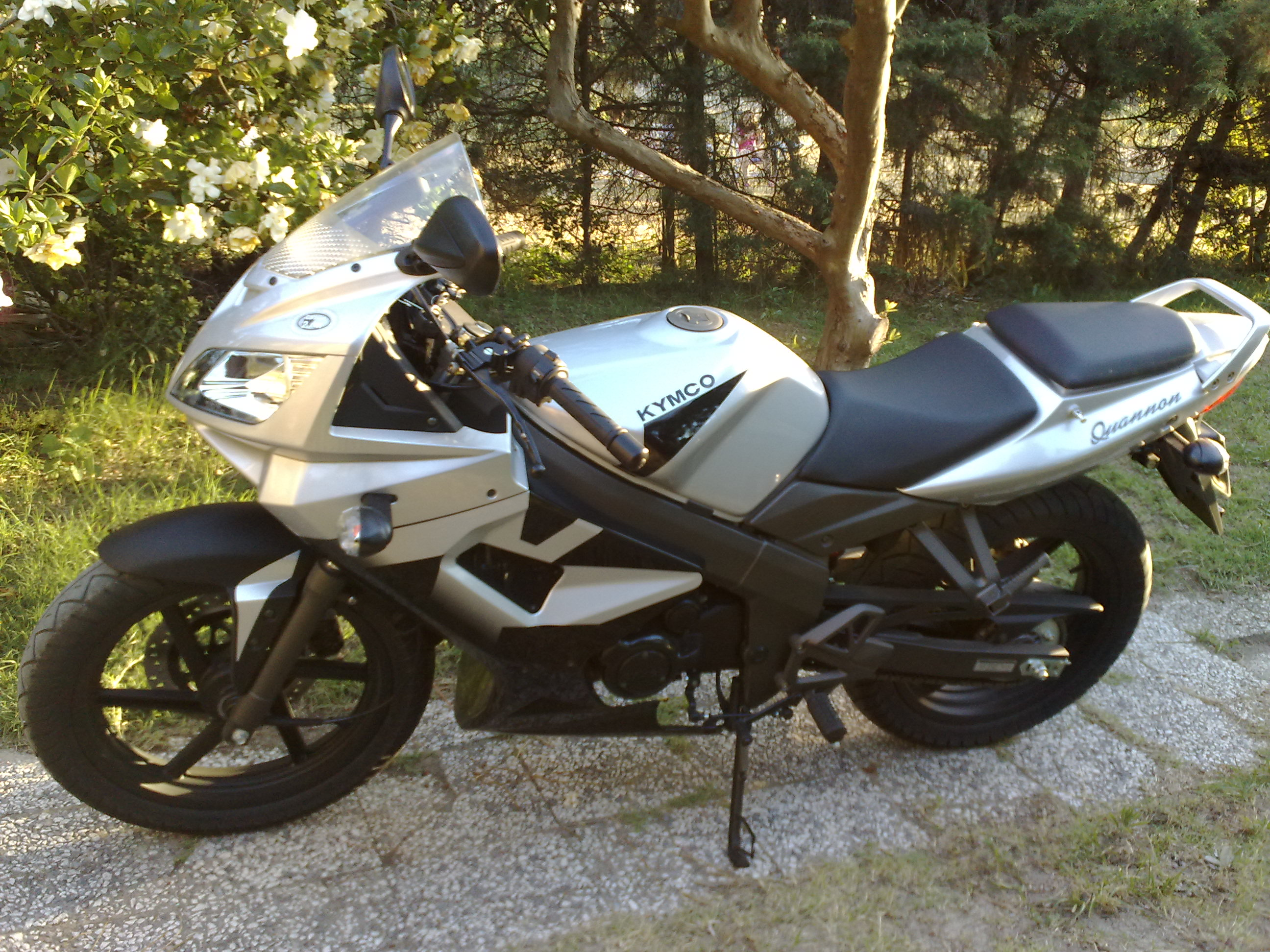
Kymco Quannon

- Activ 110/125
- Axr 110
- Cruiser 125
- CK1 125
- Grand King 125/150
- Hipster 125 2V
- Hipster 125 4V (H/Bar and L/Bar)
- Hipster 150
- Jetix 50/125
- KTR/KCR 125/150
- K-Pipe 50/125
- Kargador 150
- Pulsar/CK 125
- Pulsar Luxe 125
- Pulsar S 125
- Quannon (known as KR Sport in the U.S.)
  - Kymco Quannon 125/150/150 Fi
  - Kymco Quannon Naked 125
- Spade 150
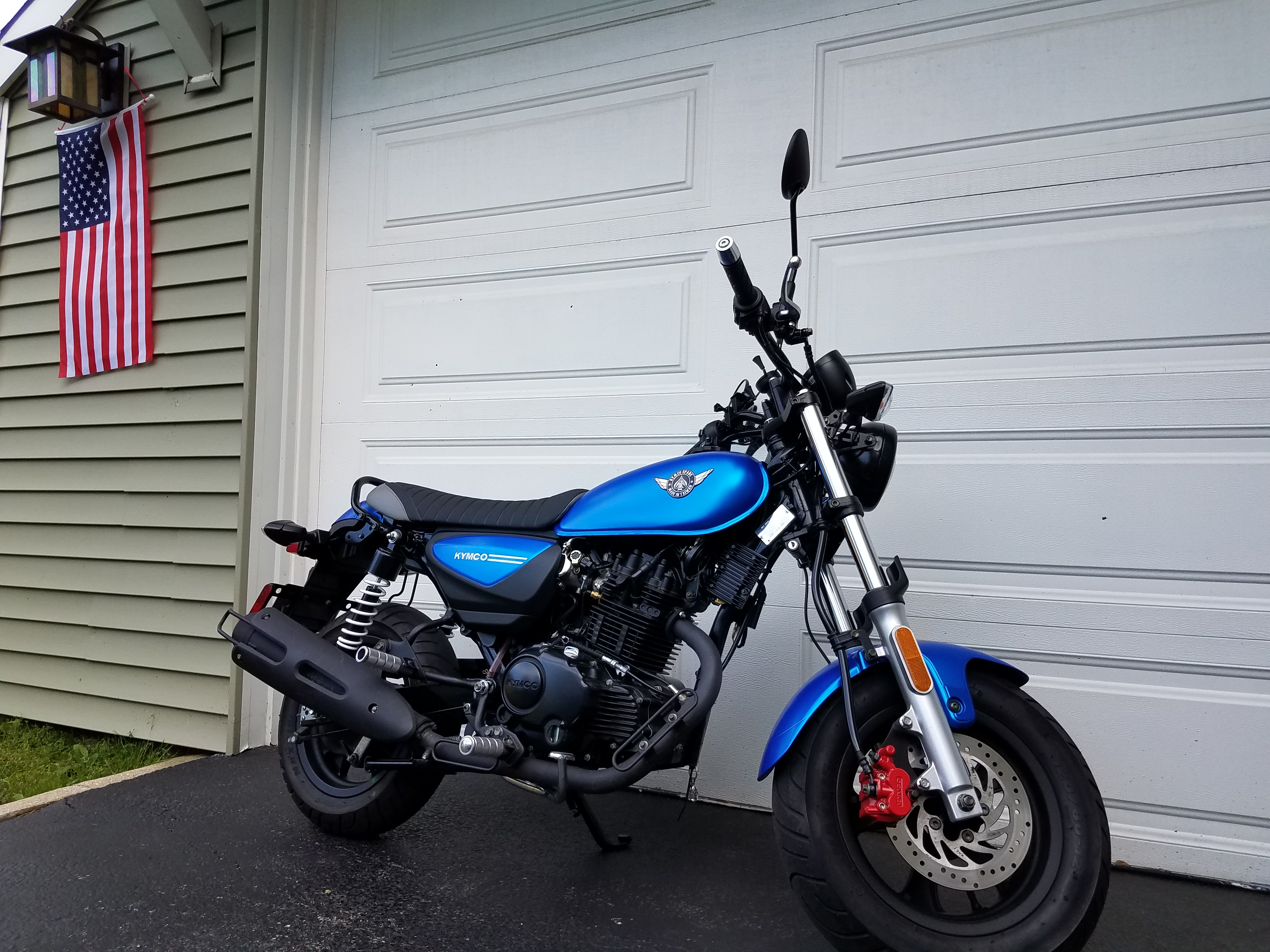
- 2018 Kymco Spade 150
  Spike 125
- Stryker 750 (on- and off-road)
- Stryker 550 (on- and off-road)
- Visa R110
- VSR 125i
- Venox 250
- Venox 1000i
- Zing 125/150
- F9
- iOneX Super 9

=== ATVs ===
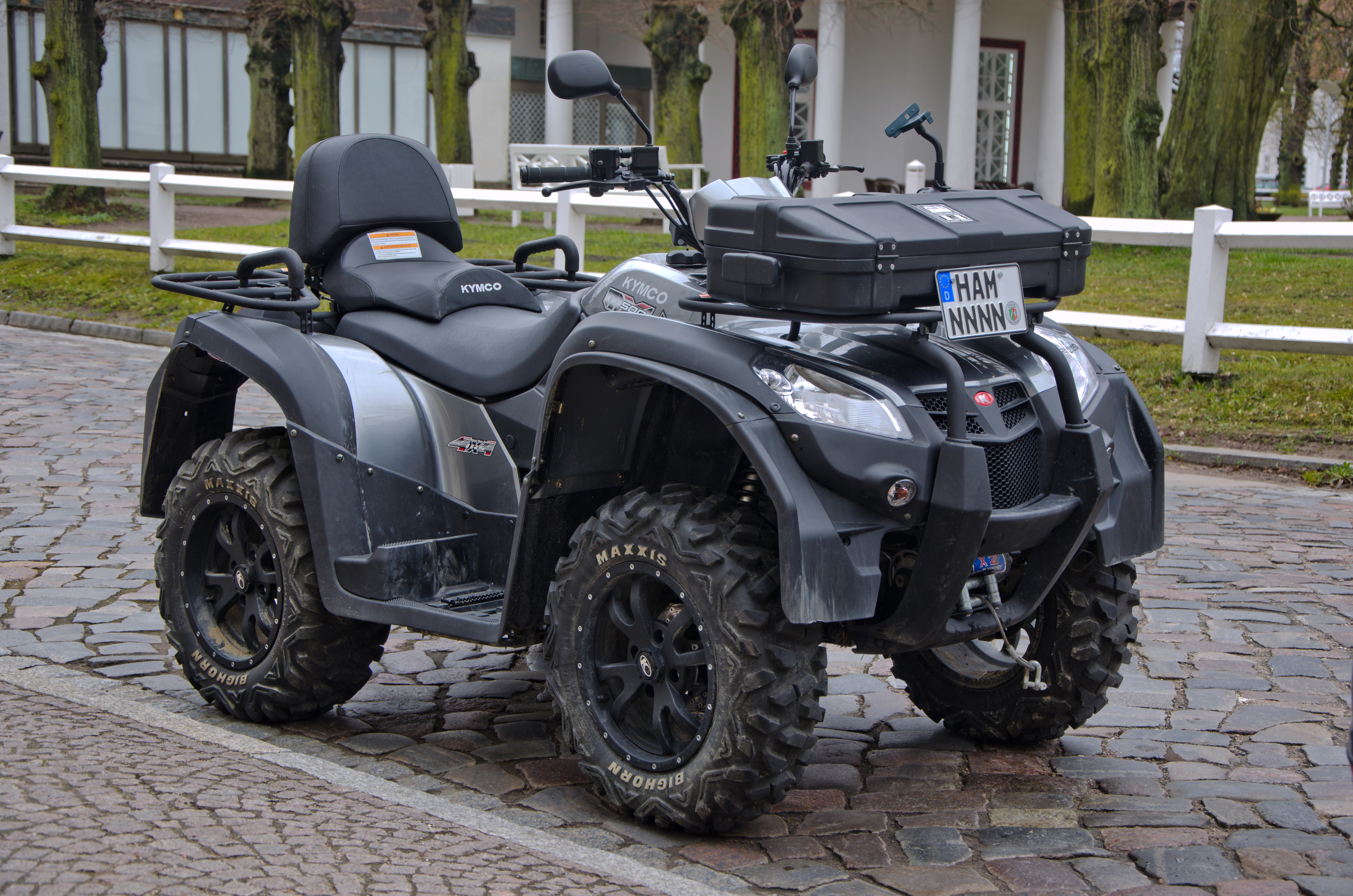
Kymco MXU 500 quad

- KXR 50/90
- KXR 250 (on-road)
- Maxxer 300 450i
- Mongoose KXR250
- MXer 50
- MXer 125
- MXer 125 (on-road)
- MXer 150
- MXer 150 (on-road)
- MXU 50/150/250/300/400/500/500i IRS
- MXU 450i/550i/700i
- UXV 450i/500i/700i

=== UTVs ===
- UXV 450i
- UXV 700i EPS
- UXV 700i EPS LE

== Kymco in the United States ==
Kymco has its U.S. subsidiary KYMCO USA headquartered in Spartanburg, South Carolina, United States, and sells its vehicles and products via 400 franchised dealerships located throughout the country. For the U.S. market, Kymco offers 10 scooters, five side by sides, 12 ATVs and a small displacement motorcycle in its line of products. Kymco was the official Scooter and ATV for the NHRA and with Gray Motorsports primary sponsor of the 2014 NHRA Mello Yello Drag Racing Series.

== Ionex Ecosystem ==
Ionex is an electric mobility ecosystem developed by Kymco in 2018, designed to enhance the adoption of electric scooters and motorcycles. Significantly expanded EICMA 2023, the Ionex program consists of three key components:

=== Ionex Energy Stations ===
These stations facilitate quick battery swapping, allowing riders to exchange depleted batteries for fully charged ones.

=== Battery-as-a-Service (BaaS) ===
This model enables users to rent Ionex batteries, reducing concerns about battery ownership and health. When batteries degrade, they can be recycled and replaced with new ones, which lowers upfront costs for consumers.

=== Battery Metering Unit (BMU) ===
This unit standardizes battery technology across various manufacturers, allowing integration into different electric vehicle designs. It enables features like keyless start and over-the-air firmware updates.

== See also ==
- Sanyang Motor
- List of companies of Taiwan
- List of Taiwanese automakers
- Automotive industry in Taiwan
