= Pyotraumatic dermatitis =

Skin disease of dogs and cats

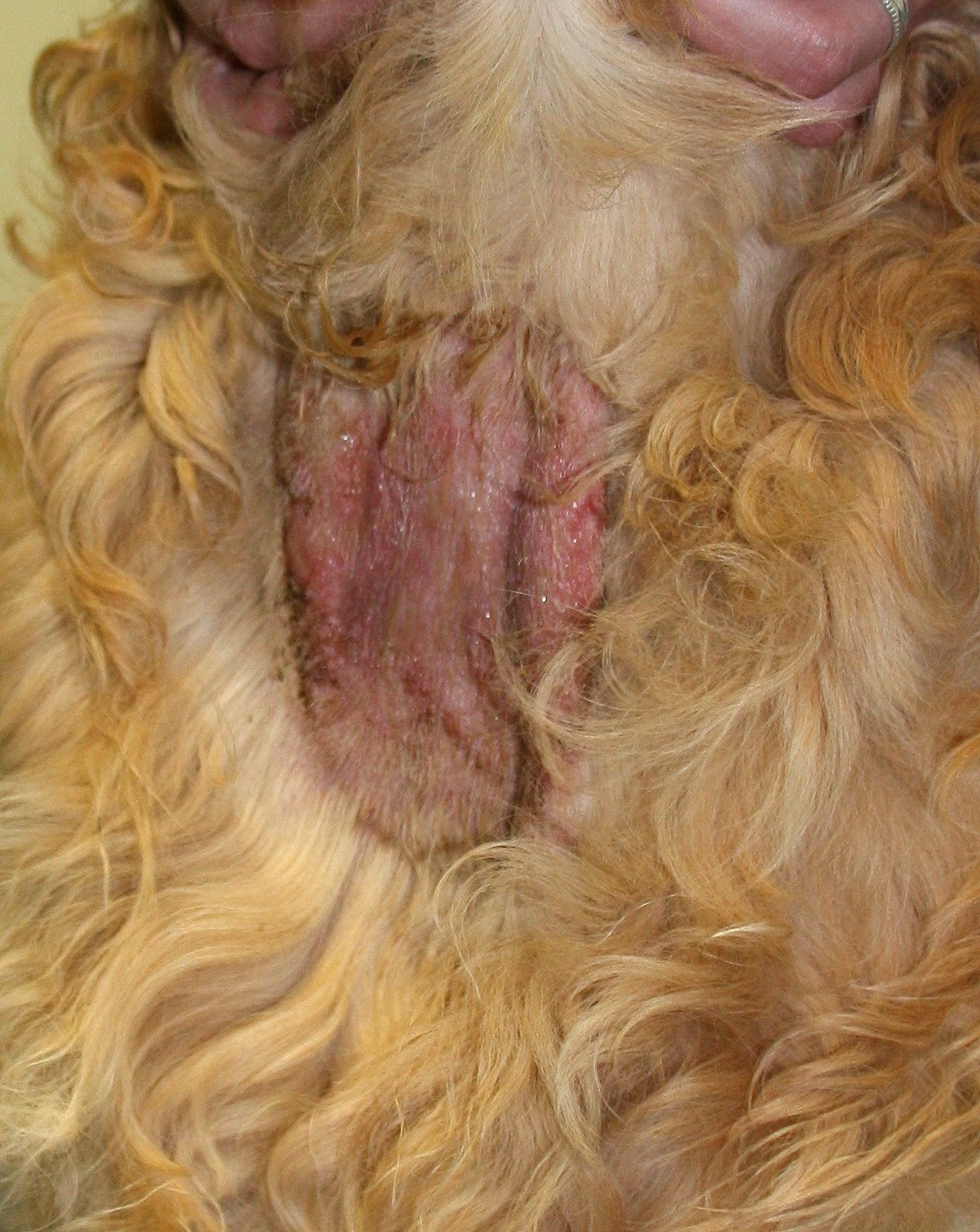
Hot spot on a Golden Retriever

Pyotraumatic dermatitis, also known as a hot spot or acute moist dermatitis, is a common infection of the skin surface of dogs, particularly those with thick or long coats. It occurs following self-inflicted trauma of the skin. Pyotraumatic dermatitis rarely affects cats.

== Signs ==
The dog persistently licks, chews, scratches or rubs at a focal area of skin, which quickly causes hair loss. The skin becomes red, moist and weeps. The affected area is obviously defined and separate from the surrounding healthy skin and coat. Usually only one area of the skin is affected. The size of the affected area is variable. If the area is difficult for the dog to scratch, or if the disease is caught early, hair may still be present. Areas commonly affected include the rump above the tail, the head and neck near the ears, and the top and sides of the lumbar area.

== Cause ==
Pyotraumatic dermatitis is caused by self-inflicted trauma to the skin, which is incited by pain or irritation, such as infestation with fleas or lice, irritation from clippers, allergic skin diseases, diseases of the anal sacs, inflammation of the ear canal, foreign bodies or irritants within the coat, or pain in muscles or joints. Skin maceration from repeated wetting of the coat or moisture in the fur can also be an inciting cause. Flea infestations are the most common inciting factor.

The inciting factor causes the dog to traumatize a small area of skin. The affected skin weeps (that is, it exudes serum), and this moist surface layer of skin can become colonized by bacteria, although the skin itself is not infected. The affected area is usually painful, as nerve endings are exposed when the surface of the skin is eroded. Hair which remains in the affected area holds in the moisture and further irritates the skin surface. Continued itching by the dog can cause the affected area to enlarge rapidly in only a few hours.

Pyotraumatic dermatitis is more common when the dog's environment is hot and humid. Dogs with thick undercoats or long fur are most commonly affected, but pyotraumatic dermatitis can occur in any dog. Commonly affected breeds include the Airedale Terrier, Akita, American Pit Bull Terrier, Basset Hound, Golden Retriever, Great Pyrenees, Labrador Retriever, Leonberger, Pembroke Welsh Corgi, Peruvian Inca Orchid (Peruvian Hairless Dog), Shiba Inu, and Xoloitzcuintle (Mexican hairless dog) as well as the German Shepherd and St. Bernard.

== Treatment ==
There are several aspects to treatment: breaking the "itch-scratch" cycle by clipping the fur and cleaning the skin; addressing the underlying painful or itchy condition which initially caused the animal to begin scratching; and relieving the dog's discomfort, for example with steroid medications.

The hair in and around the affected area is clipped before the skin is cleaned with an antiseptic, rinsed, and dried. The dog may require sedation before the fur is clipped, as skin affected by pyotraumatic dermatitis can be painful.

With treatment, pyotraumatic dermatitis resolves in 3–7 days, but can recur if the inciting factor is not addressed. The Merck Veterinary Manual classes hot spots (acute moist dermatitis) as surface pyoderma, for which topical therapy is usually enough on its own; systemic antibiotics are reserved for deep pyoderma and for the rare surface cases that topical treatment cannot clear.
