= Licking Township =

Licking Township may refer to one of the following places in the United States:

- Licking Township, Crawford County, Illinois
- Licking Township, Blackford County, Indiana
- Licking Township, Licking County, Ohio
- Licking Township, Muskingum County, Ohio
- Licking Township, Clarion County, Pennsylvania
