= Licking =

Action of passing the tongue over a surface

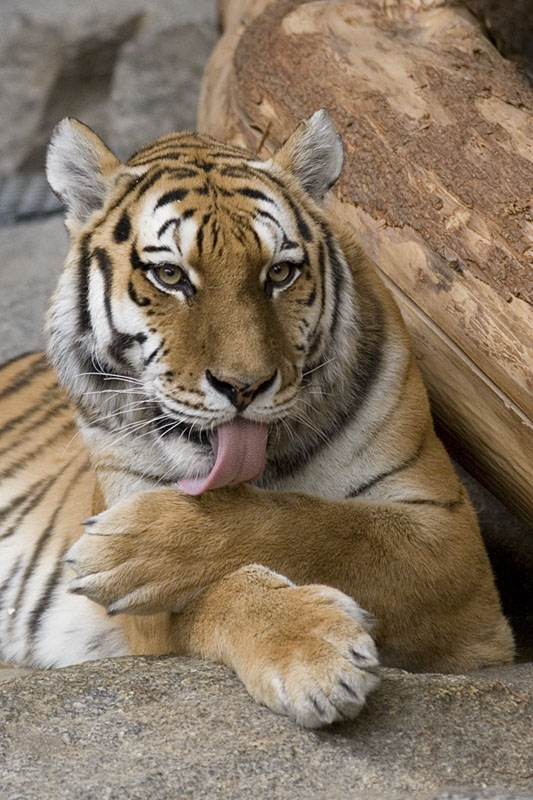
A tiger grooming its paw by licking

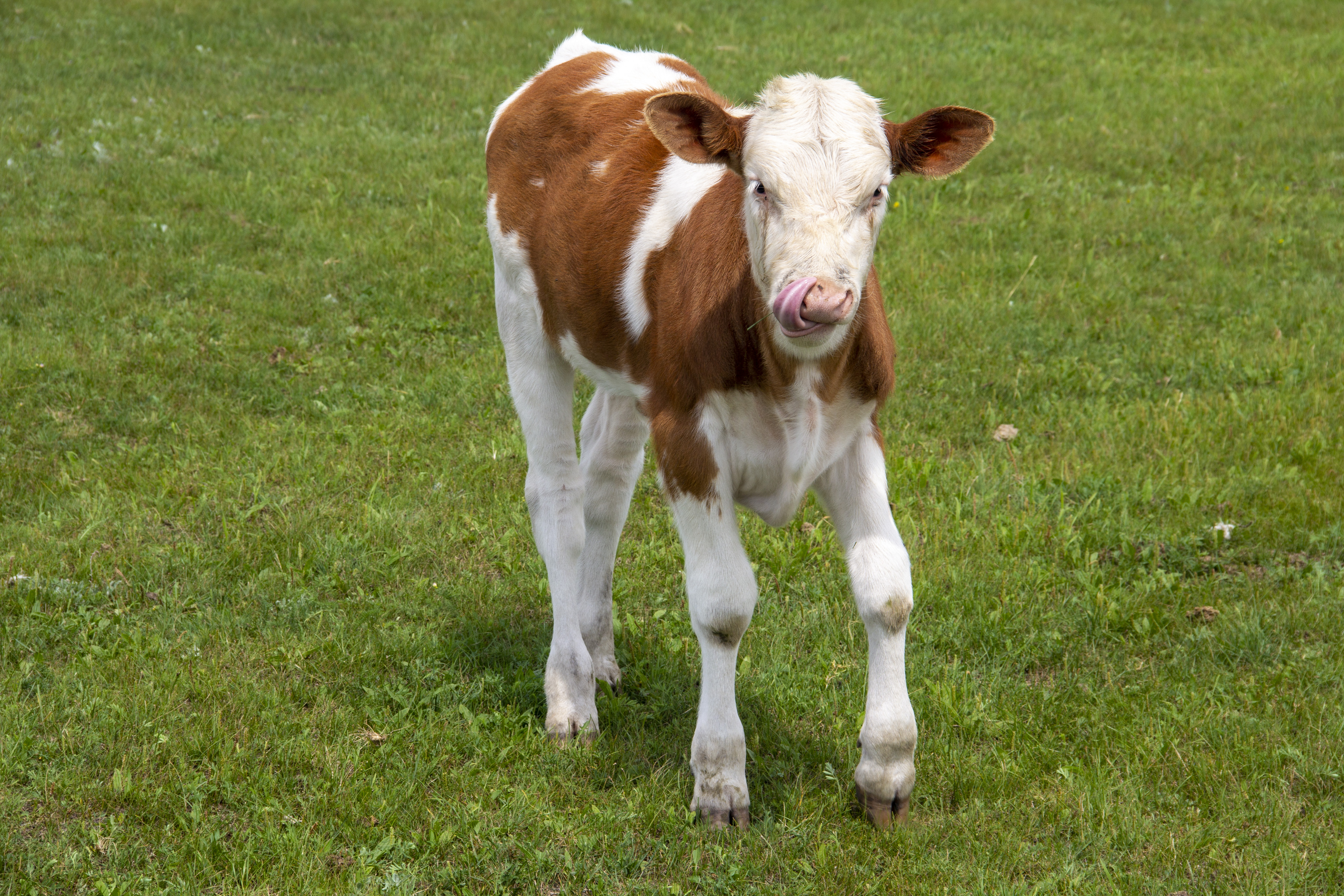
A calf licking its nose.

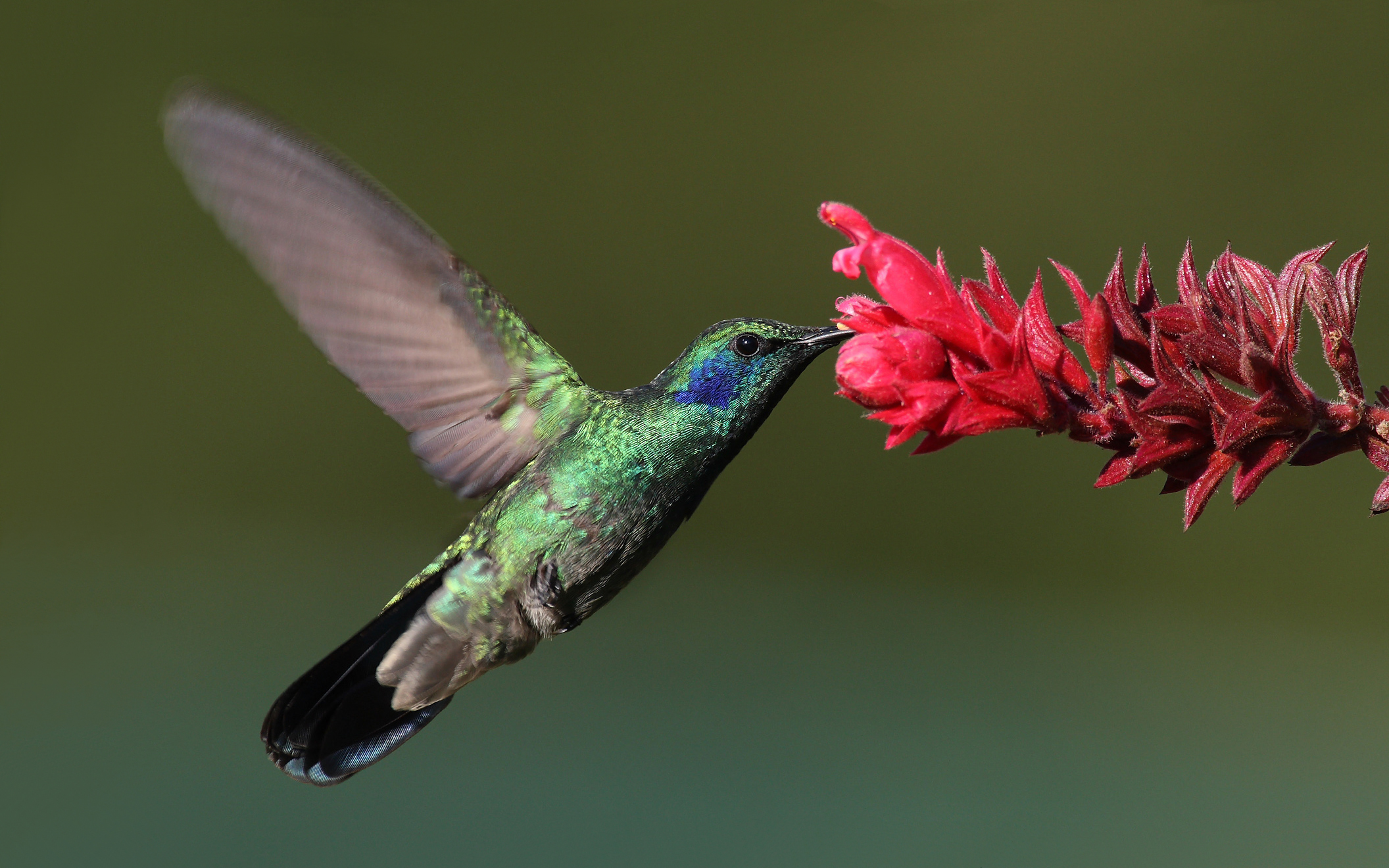
A humming bird licking for nectar

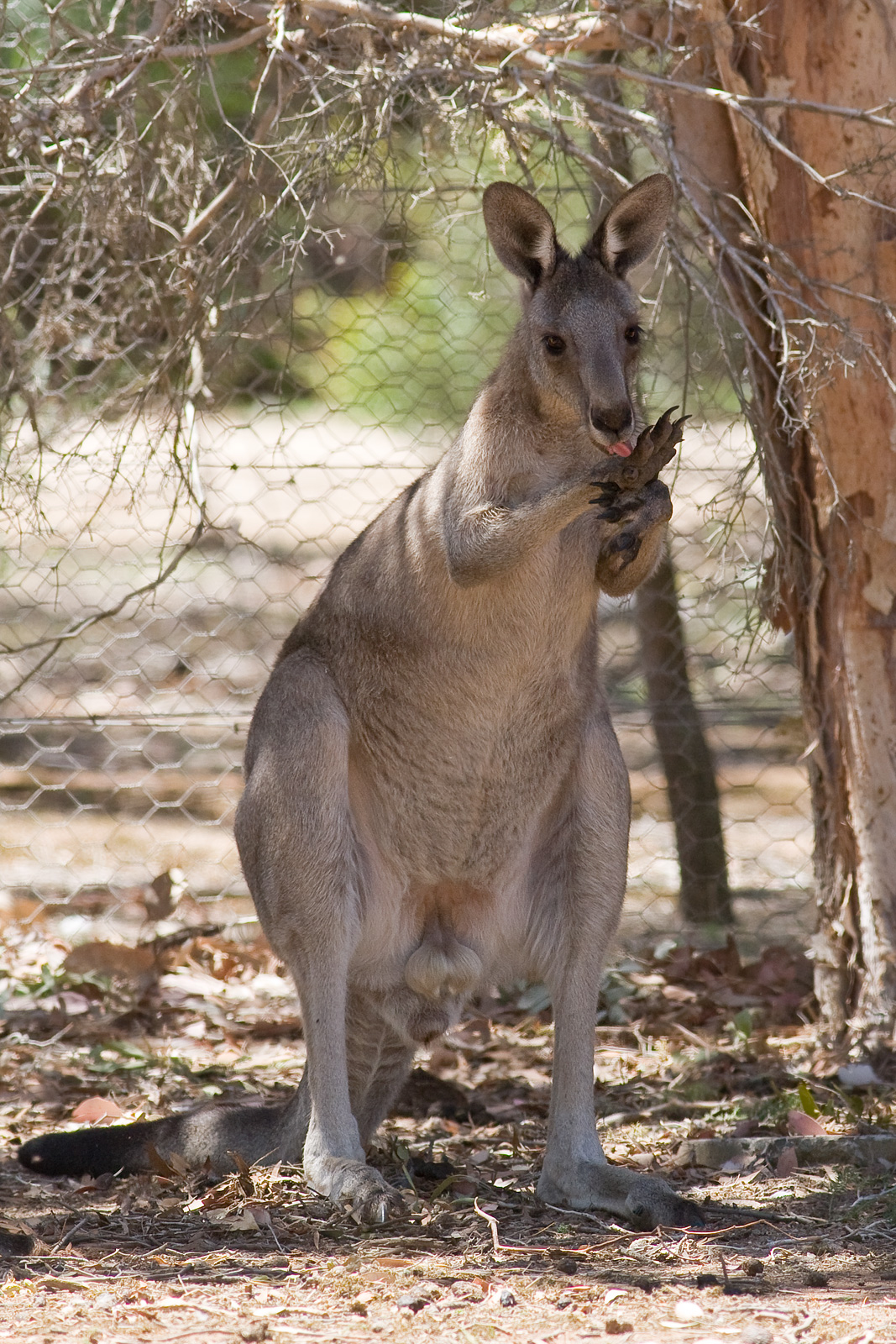
A male gray kangaroo licking his wrists to thermoregulate

Social grooming lions

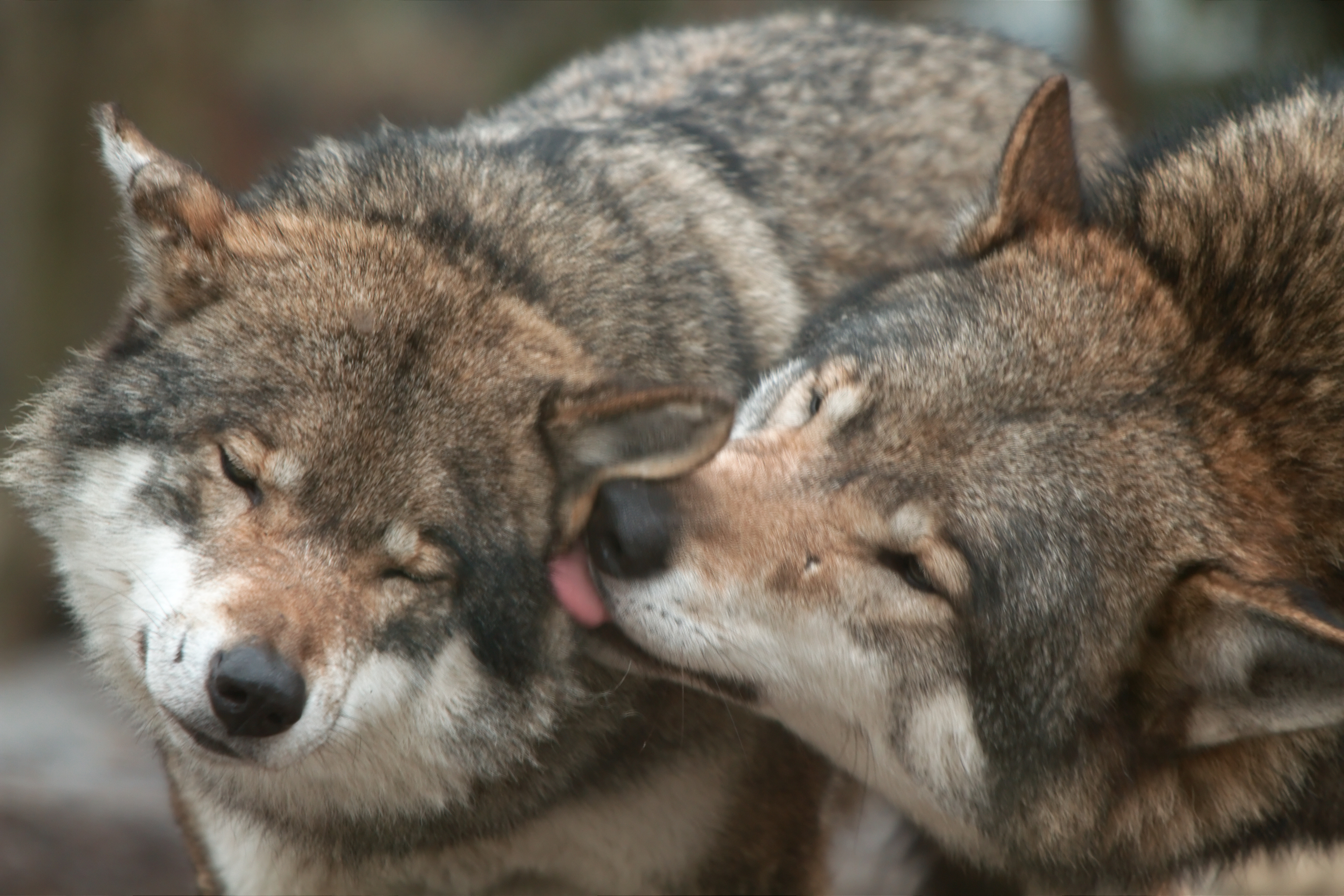
Wolves licking to indicate social status

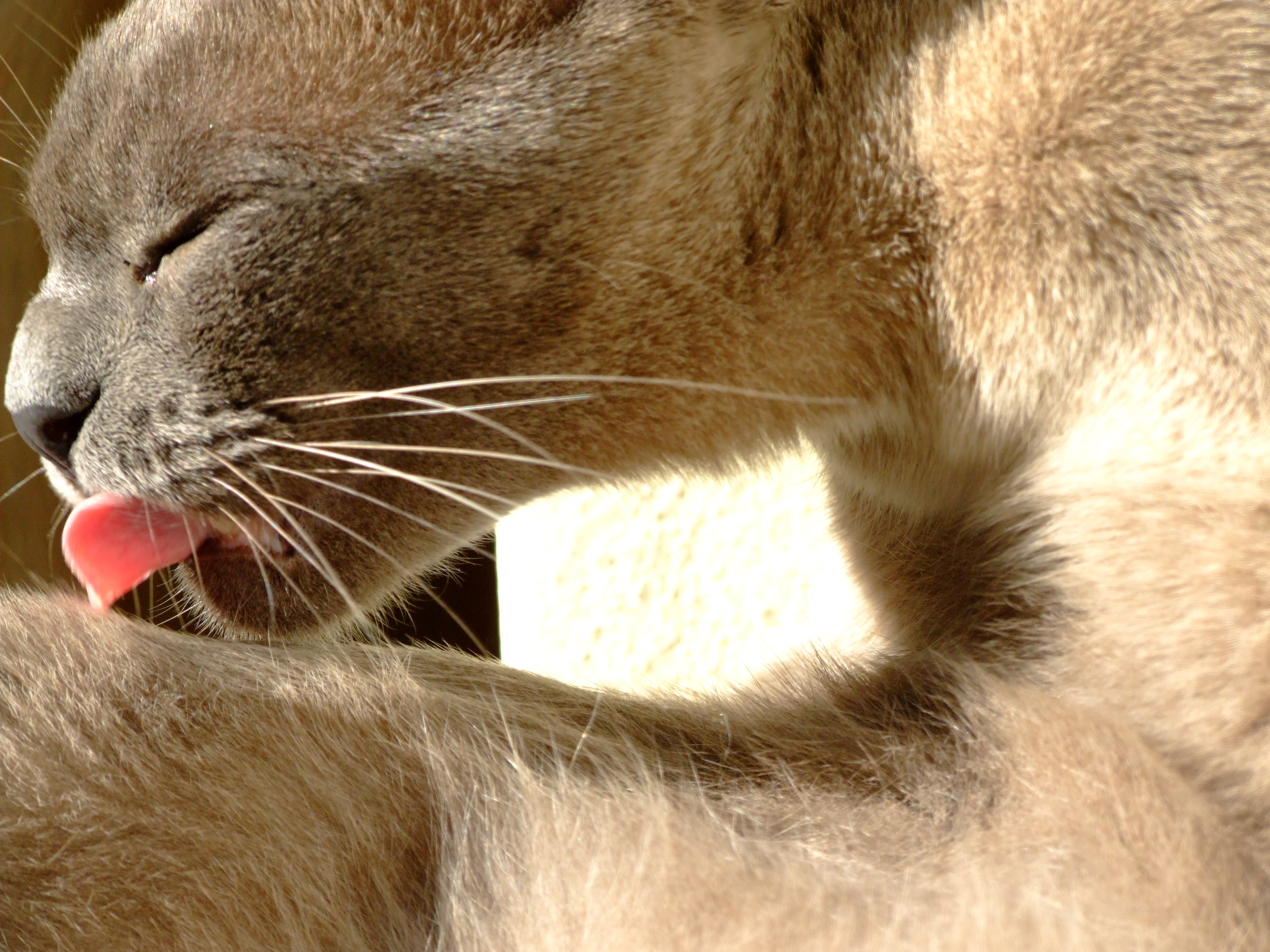
A domestic cat licking its paw during grooming

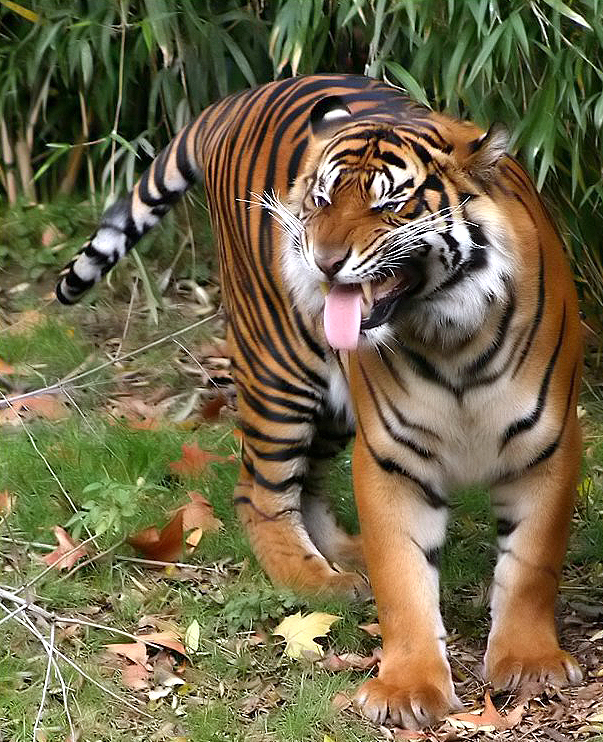
A tiger "licking" the air during the flehmen response

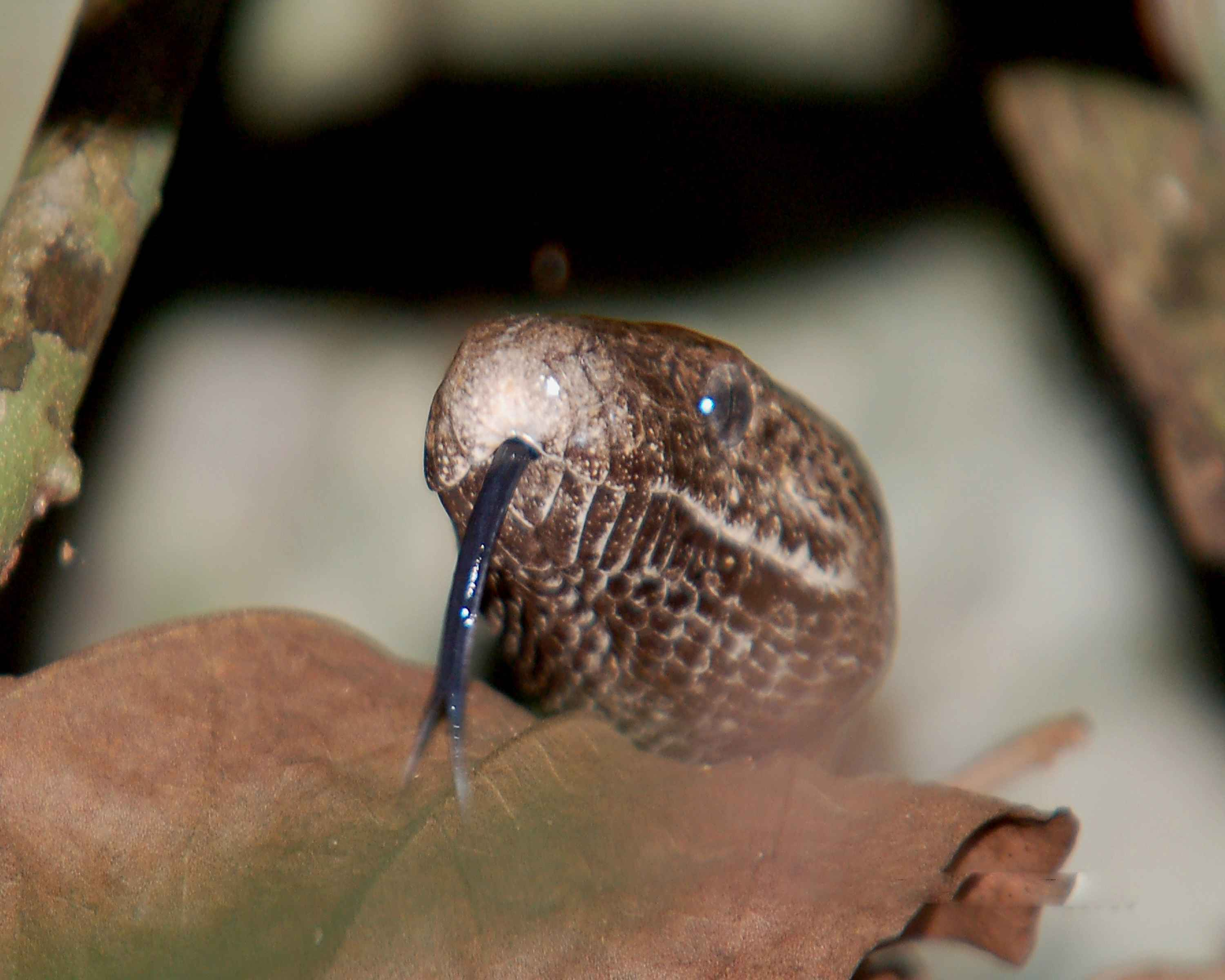
A snake licking a leaf to detect prey

Licking is the action of passing the tongue over a surface, typically either to deposit saliva onto the surface, or to collect liquid, food or minerals onto the tongue for ingestion, or to communicate with other animals. Many animals both groom themselves, eat or drink by licking.

== In animals ==
Grooming: Animals commonly clean themselves through licking. In mammals, licking helps keep the fur clean and untangled. The tongues of many mammals have a rough upper surface that acts like a brush when the animal licks its fur. Certain reptiles, such as geckos, clean their eyes by licking them, due to them not having eyelids.

Mammals typically lick their offspring clean immediately after birth; in many species this is necessary to free the newborn from the amniotic sac. The licking not only cleans and dries the offspring's fur, but also stimulates its breathing and digestive processes. Canids also stimulate their pups to urinate by licking their preputial gland secretions.

Food and water acquisition: Hummingbirds are often said to "sip" nectar, but in fact they lap up nectar on their long tongues. Their tongues have fringed edges, which help both in nectar-eating and in catching tiny insects. Mother hummingbirds also lick their chicks after a rainstorm to dry them by licking water droplets from the coats of the chicks to avoid them chilling. Many animals drink by licking. While young mammals drink milk from their mothers' teats by sucking, the typical method of drinking for adult mammals involves dipping the tongue repeatedly into water and using it to scoop water into the mouth. This method of drinking relies in part on the water adhering to the surface of the tongue and in part on muscular control of the tongue to form it into a spoonlike shape. Cattle, horses and other animals lick rocks, salt licks or other objects to obtain mineral nutrients.

Gustation: Animals also use their tongues to enhance their sense of smell. By licking a surface or extending the tongue beyond the mouth, molecules are transferred via the tongue to the olfactory receptors in the nose and in some animals, to the vomeronasal organ. In some mammals, the tongue is used to "lick" the air during the flehmen response to assist transfer of pheromones. Similarly, snakes use smell to track their prey. They smell by using their forked tongues to collect airborne particles, then passing them to the vomeronasal organ. They keep their tongues constantly in motion, sampling particles from the air, ground, and water, analyzing the chemicals found, and determining the presence of prey or predators in the local environment.

Communication: Dogs and cats use licking both to clean and to show affection among themselves or to humans, typically licking their faces. Many animals use licking as a submissive or appeasement signal in dominance hierarchies.

Thermoregulation: Some animals use licking to cool themselves. Cats do not sweat the way humans do and the saliva deposited by licking provides a similar means of evaporative cooling. Some animals spread saliva over areas of the body with little or no fur to maximise heat loss. For example, kangaroos lick their wrists and rats lick their testicles.

Mating behavior: Male mammals often lick the genitals of females before copulation. Post-copulatory genital grooming often occurs in male rats and prosimian primates. This behavior may prevent disease transmission.

=== In primates ===
Ring-tailed lemurs lick each other's babies as a means of collective grooming and of reinforcing social cohesion within the community. Macaques and other primates lick leaves for water in addition to dipping their arms into tree crevices and licking the water off. Chimpanzees use licking in a variety of ways: licking objects, such as dead trees, that others in their community have licked, licking each other's body parts for grooming and sex and licking rocks for salt. Gorillas use licking in addition to other senses to determine the nature of an object.

==== In humans ====
Compared to most other mammals, licking has a minor role for humans. The human tongue is relatively short and inflexible, and is not well adapted for either grooming or drinking. Instead, humans prefer to wash themselves using their hands and drink by sucking or pouring fluid into their mouth. Humans have much less hair over their skin than most other mammals, and much of that hair is in places which they cannot reach with their own mouth. The presence of sweat glands all over the human body makes licking as a cooling method unnecessary.

Nonetheless, licking does play a role for humans. Even though humans cannot effectively drink water by licking, the human tongue is quite sufficient for licking more viscous fluids. Some foods are sold in a form intended to be consumed mainly by licking, e.g. ice cream cones and lollipops. Though useful, in some cultures it is considered improper table manners to clean one's fingers by licking during a meal.

Humans use licking for a number of other purposes. For example, licking can moisten the adhesive surfaces of stamps or envelopes. Many people lick a fingertip (usually that of the index finger) for some extra grip when turning a page, taking a sheet of paper from the top of a pile or opening a plastic bag. In sewing, thread ends are commonly wet by licking to make the fibres stick together and thus make threading them through the eye of a needle easier. Another practice considered uncivilized is licking one's hand and using it to groom one's hair.

Humans also use their tongues for sexual purposes, such as during cunnilingus, anilingus, fellatio, breast licking, foot licking, and whilst French kissing, where two people lick each other's tongues.

=== In dogs ===
Licking behavior has multiple causes and meanings and should not be simply interpreted as affection. Dogs that are familiar with each other may lick each other's faces in greeting, then sniff any moist membranes where odors are strongest (i.e. mouth, nose, anal region, or urogenital region.) Mating behaviors are characterized by licking in a more vigorous manner than used during greetings. Licking can communicate information about dominance, intentions, and state of mind, and, like the yawn, is mainly a pacifying behavior. All pacifying behaviors contain elements of puppy behavior, including licking. Puppies lick themselves and their littermates as part of the cleaning process, and it appears to build bonds. Later in life, licking ceases to be a cleaning function and forms a ritualized gesture indicating friendliness. When stressed, a dog might lick the air, its own lips, or drop down and lick its paws or body. Lip-licking and sniffing are also recognized as calming signals.

== Abnormal licking ==
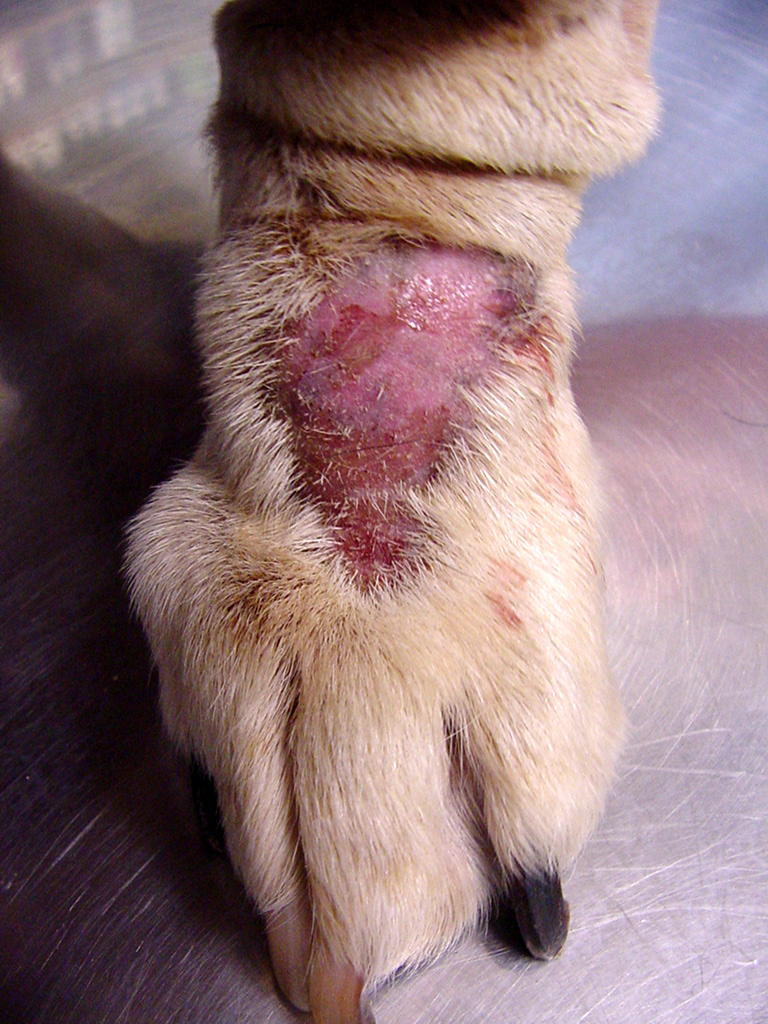
Lick granuloma on a dog's paw

Self-licking can sometimes become abnormally frequent occasionally resulting in a lick granuloma. The most common cause of lick granuloma appears to be psychological, related to stress, anxiety, separation anxiety, boredom, or compulsiveness. Lick granulomae are especially seen in active dogs left alone for long periods of time. One theory is that excessive licking causes endorphin release, which reduces pain and makes the dog feel temporarily euphoric. This provides the animal with positive feedback from the licking, and subsequent addiction to the behaviour.

Animals in captivity sometimes develop a licking stereotypy during which surfaces (walls, bars, gates, etc.) are repeatedly licked for no apparent reason. This has been observed in captive giraffes and camels.
