= Bulldog type =

Dog type

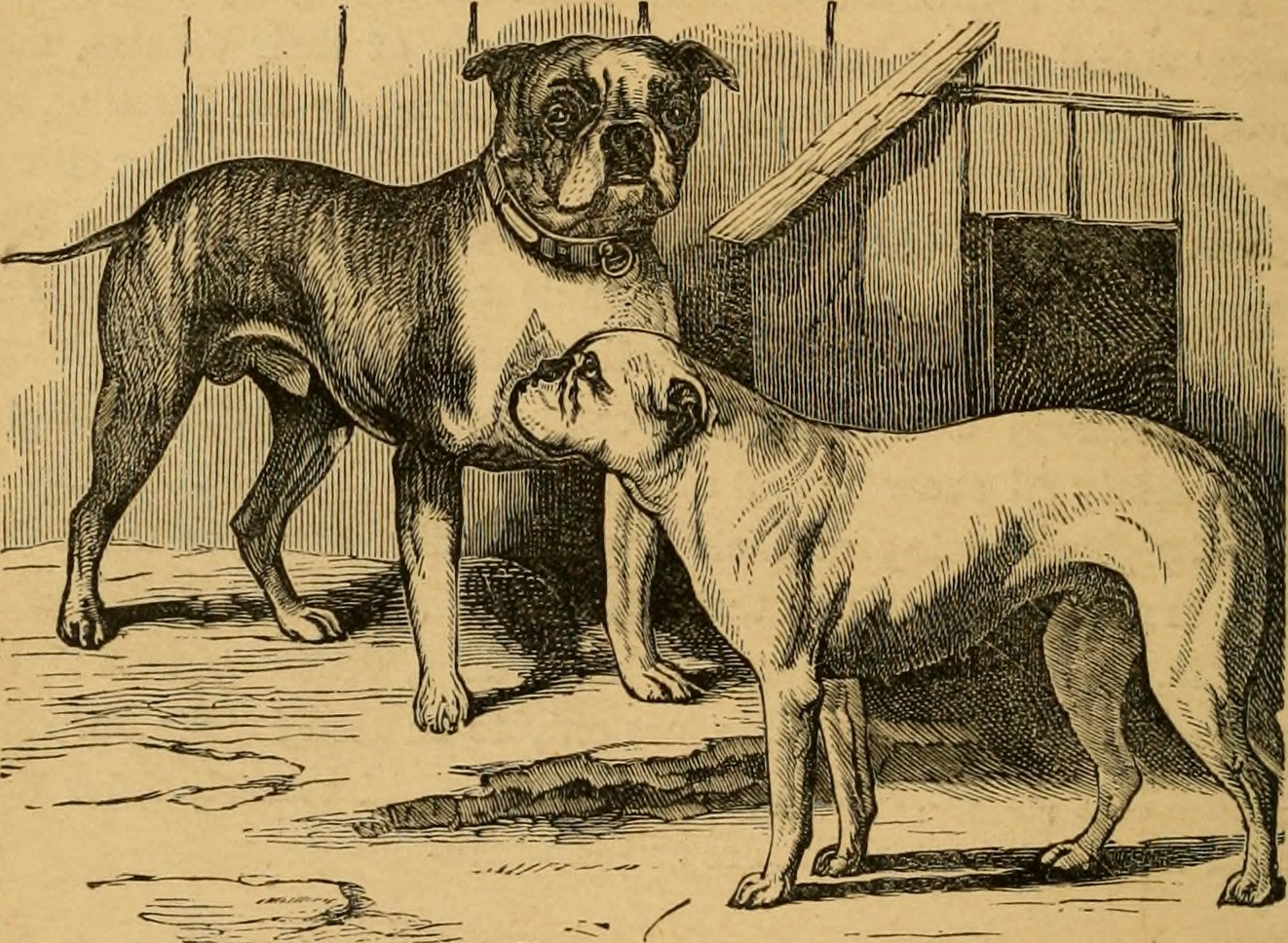
Bulldogs, 1879

Bulldogs are a type of dog that were traditionally used for the blood sports of baiting and dog fighting, but today are kept for other purposes, including companion dogs, guard dogs and catch dogs. Bulldogs are typically stocky, powerful, square-built animals with large, strong, brachycephalic-type muzzles. "Bull" is a reference that originated in England that refers to the sport of bull-baiting, which was a national sport in England between the 13th and 18th century. It is believed that bulldogs were developed during the 16th century in the Elizabethan era from the larger mastiffs, as smaller, more compact dogs were better suited for baiting.

== List of bulldog breeds ==
=== Extant breeds ===
- Alano Español (Spanish Bulldog)
- Alapaha Blue Blood Bulldog
- American Bulldog
- Bulldog
- Campeiro Bulldog
- Continental Bulldog
- French Bulldog
- Olde English Bulldogge
- Perro de Presa Mallorquin
- Serrano Bulldog

=== Extinct breeds ===
- Bullenbeisser (German Bulldog)
- Old English Bulldog
- Toy Bulldog

== Gallery ==
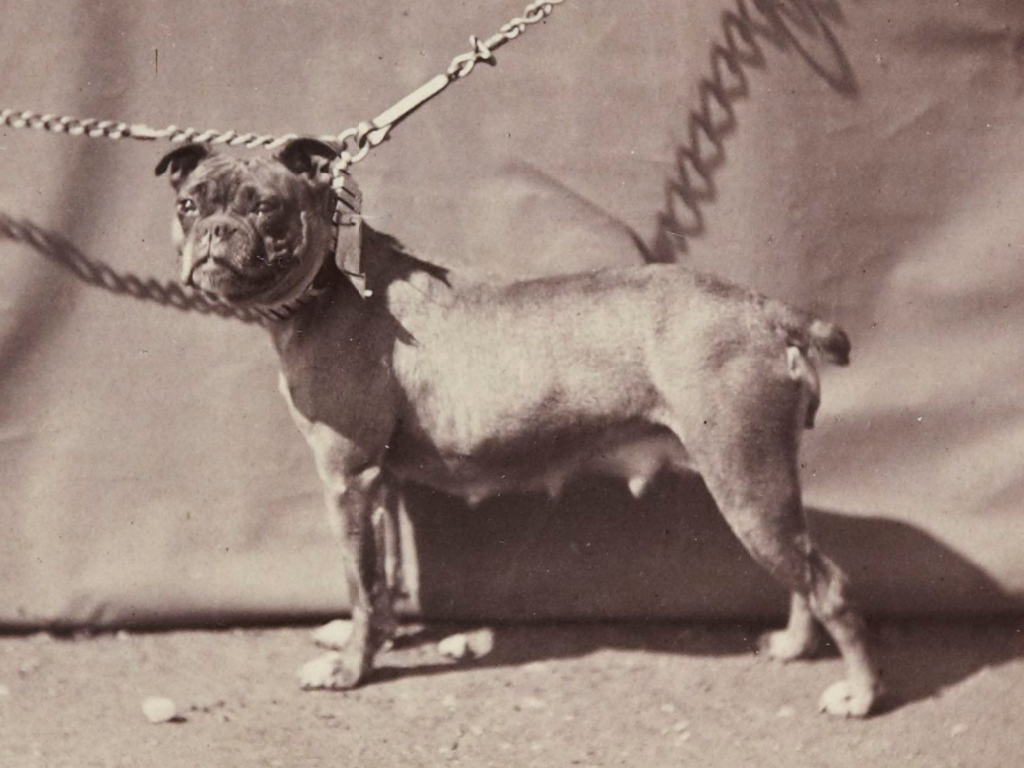
Old English Bulldog in Paris, 1863

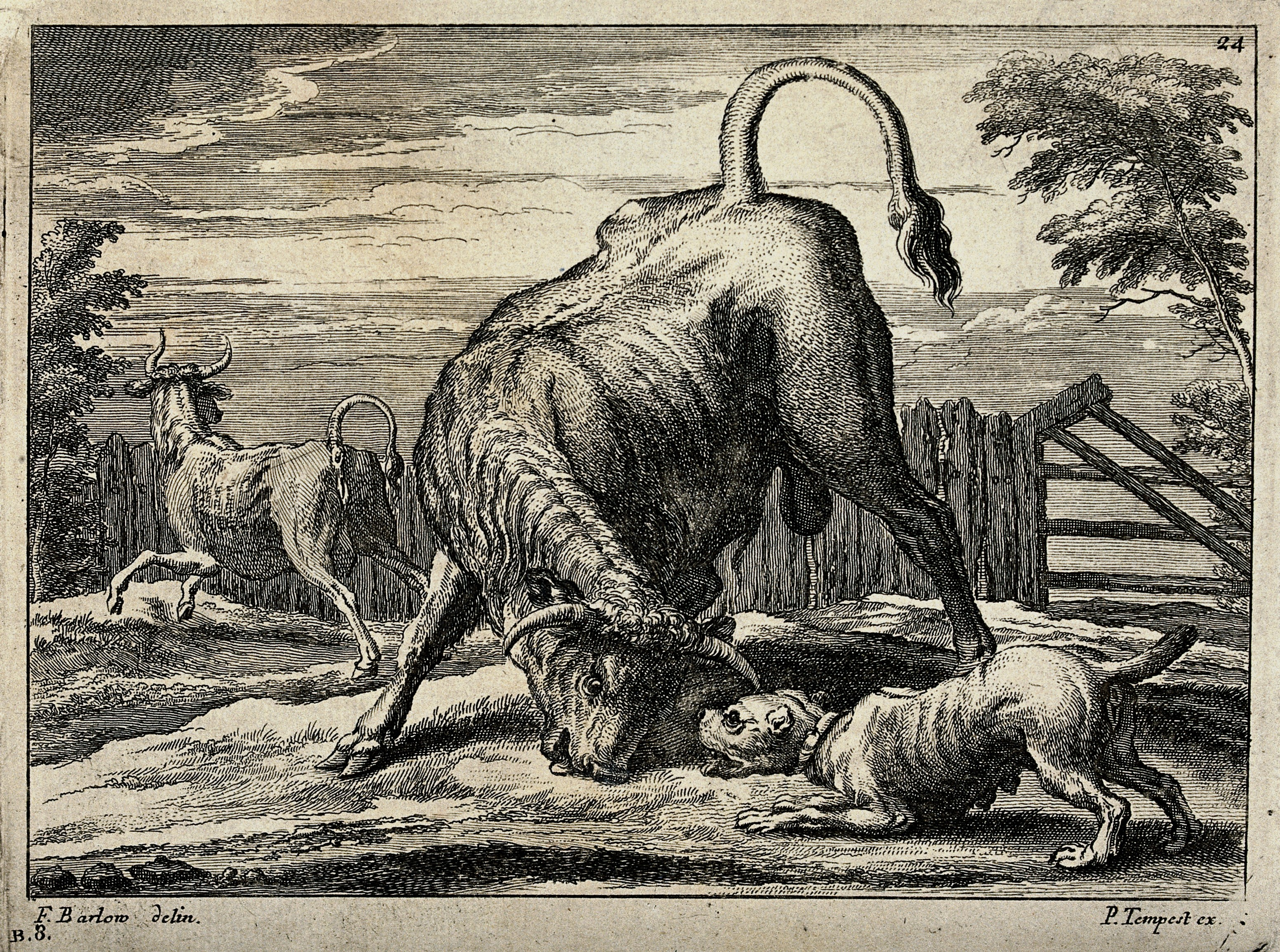
A bull and a bulldog, etching by F. Barlow, circa 17th century A.D..

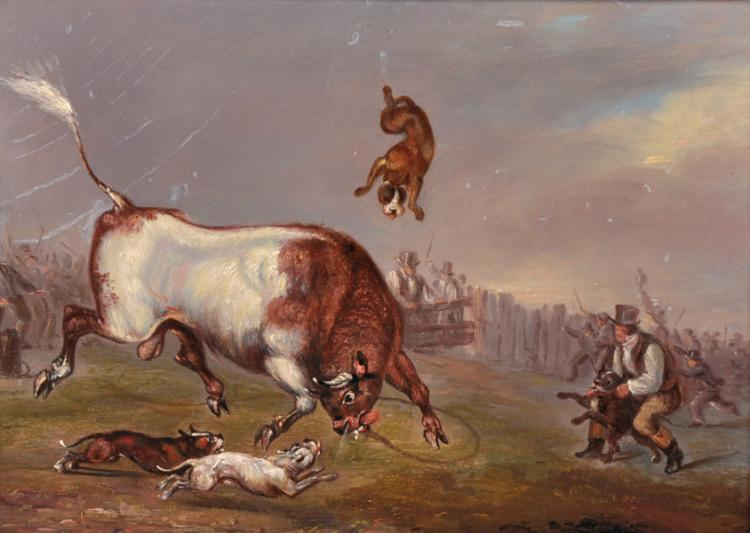
Bull-baiting with dogs, 19th century

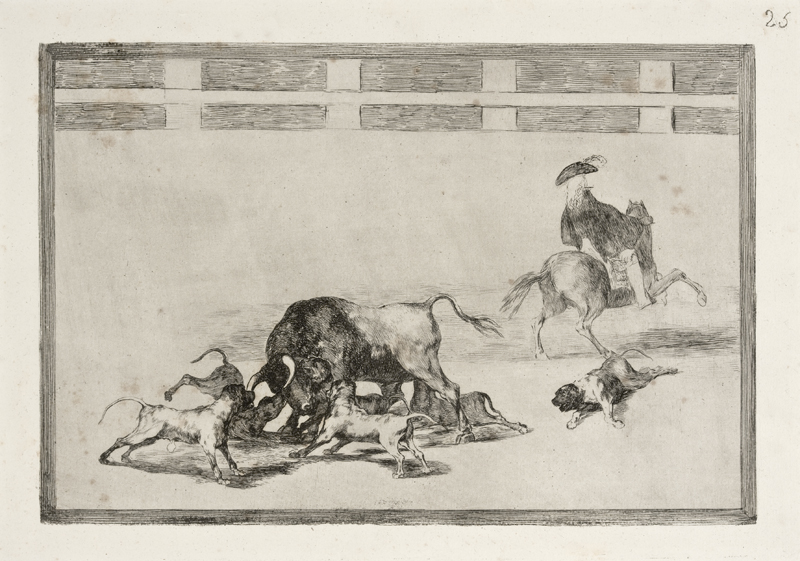
Spanish Alano dogs, bull-fighting scene by Goya, circa 1815

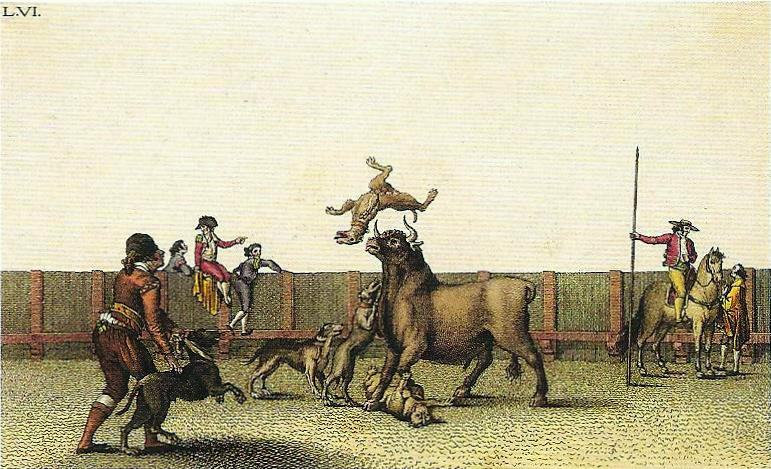
Spanish Alano dogs, bull-fighting scene, circa 1795
