= Gaucho sheepdog =

Ovelheiro Gaúcho
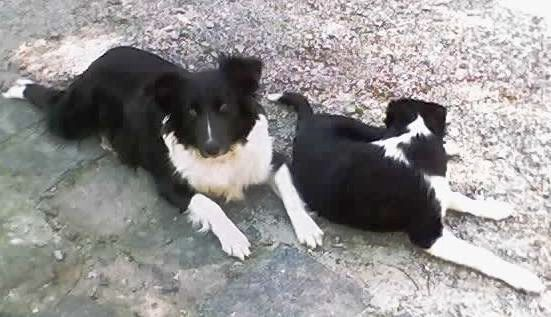
- Other names: Brazilian Sheepdog; Gaucho Sheepdog
- Common nicknames: Brazilian collie
- Origin: Brazil
Traits
- Height: 55–65 cm (22–26 in)
- Colour: Any color
Kennel club standards
- CBKC: standard

The Ovelheiro Gaúcho, also known in English as the Gaucho Sheepdog, is a dog breed that originated in the Pampas of Brazil. The breed is not recognized by the Fédération Cynologique Internationale (FCI), but it has been recognized by the CBKC, a Brazilian kennel club affiliated with FCI. Dogs of this breed are often characterized as sturdy and agile, which makes them suitable for herding activities.

== History ==
According to the breeders' association, collie-type herding dogs arrived in Rio Grande do Sul with European immigrants in the late 19th century to help manage their livestock. Once established, these dogs were bred selectively by gauchos for herding ability and suitability to the region's climate and work, giving rise to the Ovelheiro Gaúcho. The breed resembles other dogs descended from British herding types, including the Border Collie and Rough Collie, in appearance and to a lesser degree in behavior. Border Collies were introduced later, arriving in the municipality of Uruguaiana in the 1950s with a shipment of Australian Merino sheep. By then the Ovelheiro Gaúcho type was established, and breeders avoided crossing it with Border Collies because of differences in herding style.

== Appearance ==
In appearance, Ovelheiro Gaúcho dogs are most similar to Border Collies and Rough Collies, but they move differently than Border Collies when they are working sheep. They are medium-sized, larger than Border Collies and a little bit smaller than typical Rough Collies of show and pet lines. Their coats are of moderate length, with or without an undercoat, in various colors.

== Temperament ==
Ovelheiro Gaúcho dogs are seen as good watchdog candidates since they are alert to changes in their environment, such as a stranger or a strange dog approaching, although they seldom attack intruders. They are intelligent dogs and learn commands quickly, and they are not aggressive with their herds. These dogs are known as being docile and friendly within their human family.

== See also ==
- List of dog breeds
- Dogue Brasileiro
- Fila Brasileiro
- Terrier Brasileiro
- Campeiro Bulldog
