= Mastiff =

Type of dog

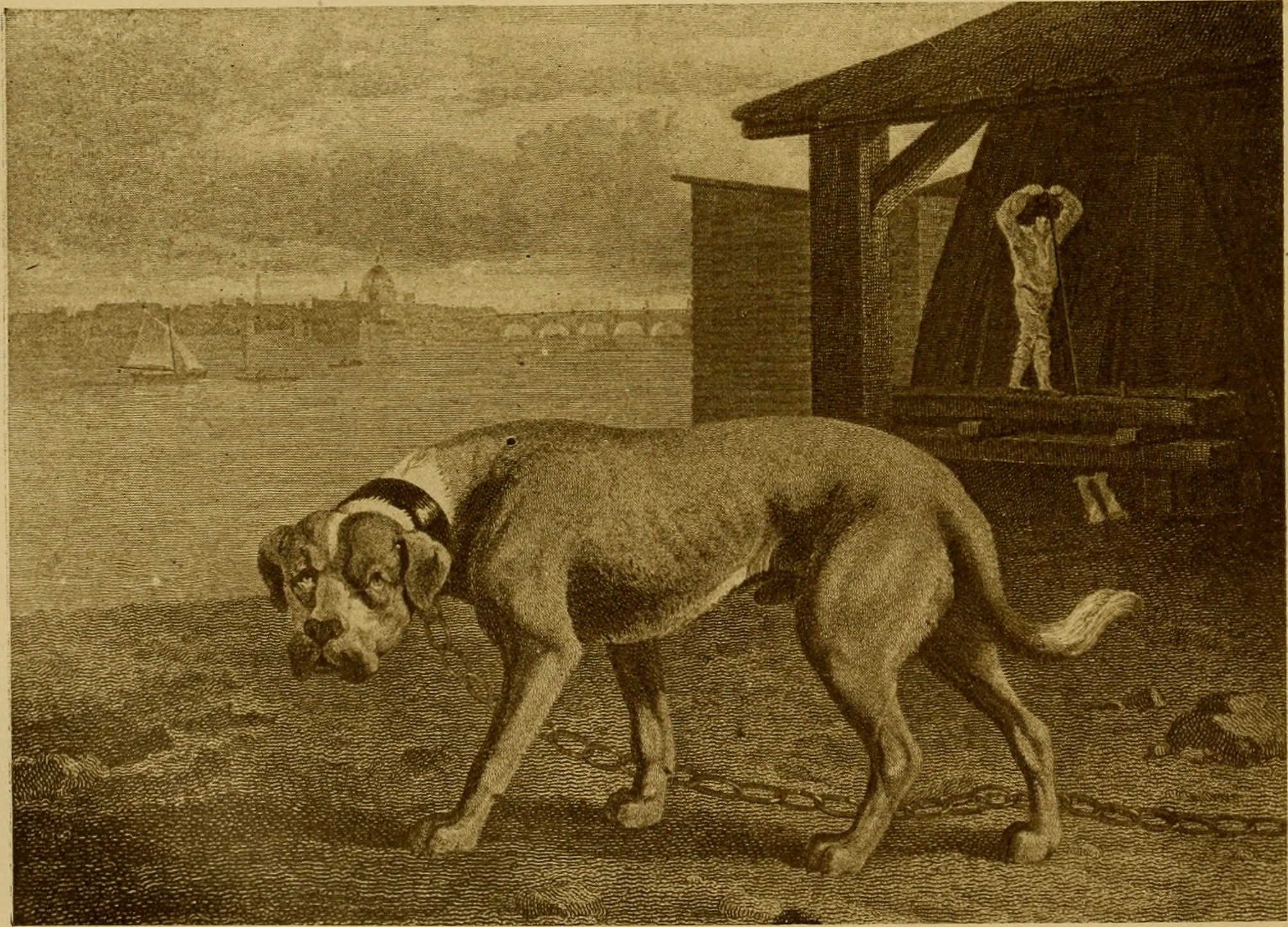
The Mastiff by Philip Reinagle, 1805

A mastiff is a large and powerful type of dog. Mastiffs are among the largest dogs, and typically have a short coat, a long low-set tail and large feet; the skull is large and bulky, the muzzle broad and short (brachycephalic) and the ears drooping and pendant-shaped. European and Asian records dating back 3,000 years show dogs of the mastiff type. Mastiffs have historically been guard dogs, protecting homes and property, although throughout history they have been used as hunting dogs, war dogs and for blood sports, such as dog fighting, bull-baiting, bear-baiting, and even lion-baiting.

== History ==
Historical and archaeological evidence suggests that mastiffs have long been distinct in both form and function from the similarly large livestock guardian dogs from which they were most likely developed; they also form separate genetic populations. The Fédération Cynologique Internationale (FCI) and some kennel clubs group the two types together as molossoid dogs; some modern livestock guardian dogs such as the Pyrenean Mastiff, the Spanish Mastiff, the Tibetan Mastiff, and the Kurdish Mastiff, an extinct drafting dog named the Belgian Mastiff, and an extinct livestock guardian dog type named the Alpine mastiff have the word "mastiff" in their names, but are not considered to be true mastiffs.

Many older English sources refer to mastiffs as bandogs or bandogges, although technically the term "bandog" meant a dog that was tethered by a chain (or "bande") that would be released at night; the terms "mastiff" and "bandog" were often used interchangeably. In the twentieth century the term "bandog" was revived to describe some large fighting mastiff type dogs crossed with any bulldog in the United States.

== List of mastiff breeds ==
=== Extant breeds ===
Breed	Alternate name(s)	Country of origin	Use	Image
Alano Español	Spanish Alano; Spanish Bulldog	Spain	War dog, bull-baiting, big-game hunting	
Alapaha Blue Blood Bulldog		United States	Guard dog	
American Bulldog	Old Southern White Bulldog; Old Southern White; English White Bulldog; White English; Hill Bulldog; Country Bulldog	United States	Guard dog, catch dog, farm dog	
Boerboel	South African Mastiff	South Africa	Guard dog	
Boxer	German Boxer; Deutscher Boxer	Germany	Guard dog, big-game hunting	
Broholmer	Danish Broholmer; Danish Mastiff	Denmark	Guard dog	
Bulldog	English Bulldog; British Bulldog	United Kingdom (England)	Companion dog, formerly bull-baiting	
Bullmastiff	Gamekeeper's Night Dog	United Kingdom (England)	Guard dog	
Bully Kutta	Indian Mastiff; Pakistani Mastiff; Sindhi Mastiff; Indian Bully; Pakistani Bully	India and Pakistan	Guard dog, big-game hunting, dog fighting	
Campeiro Bulldog	Buldogue Campeiro; Brazilian Bulldog; Countryside Bulldog; Pampas Bulldog	Brazil	Cattle-herding dog, catch dog, butcher's dog	
Cane Corso	Italian Mastiff; Italian Corso Dog; Italian Corso; Cane Corso Italiano	Italy	Guard dog, catch dog	
Cão Fila de São Miguel	São Miguel Cattle Dog; Saint Miguel Cattle Dog; Azores Cattle Dog; Azores Cow Dog	Portugal	Cattle-herding dog, catch dog	
Chongqing dog	Chongqin; East Sichuan Hound	China	Guard dog	
Cimarrón Uruguayo	Cimarrón; Uruguayan Cimarrón; Cimarrón Creole; Maroon Dog; Cerro Largo Dog; Perro Cimarrón; Cimarrón Dog; Uruguayan Gaucho Dog	Uruguay	Guard dog	
Continental Bulldog	Conti; Swiss Bulldog	Switzerland	Companion dog	
Dogo Argentino	Argentine Dogo; Argentine Mastiff; Argentinean Mastiff	Argentina	Guard dog, big-game hunting, dog fighting	
Dogo Guatemalteco	Guatemalan Dogo; Guatemalan Bull Terrier; Bullterrier Guatemalteco	Guatemala	Guard dog, formerly bull-baiting	
Dogue Brasileiro		Brazil	Guard dog	
Dogue de Bordeaux	French Mastiff; Bordeaux Mastiff; Bordeaux dog	France	Guard dog	
English Mastiff	Old English Mastiff; Mastiff	United Kingdom (England)	Guard dog	
Fila Brasileiro	Brazilian Mastiff; Cão de Fila Brasileiro	Brazil	Guard dog	
French Bulldog	Bouledogue Français; Frenchie	France	Lap dog	
Great Dane	Deutsche Dogge; German Mastiff; German Boarhound	Germany	Big-game hunting	
Laizhou Hong	Zhuqiao Hong; Sulian Hong; Shandong Hong; Laizhou Hong Dog; Zhuqiao Hong Dog; Laizhouhong Dog; Zhuqiaohong Dog; Sulianhong Dog; Shandonghong Dog; Shanhong Quan; Huxing Quan; Chuanhong Quan; Shanhong Dog; Huxing Dog; Chuanhong Dog; Chinese Red Dog; Chinese Mountain Red Dog; China Mountain Red Dog; Red Dog; China's Red Dog; Soviet Red Dog; Mountain red dog; Red dog of Laizhou; Red dog of Zhuqiao; Dyscophus Guineti	China	Companion dog, working dog, guard dog	
Neapolitan Mastiff	Mastino Napoletano	Italy	Guard dog	
Olde English Bulldogge		United States	A modern-day re-creation of the extinct Old English Bulldog	
Perro de Presa Mallorquin	Ca de Bou; Majorca Mastiff; Perro Dogo Mallorquin	Spain	Bull-baiting	
Presa Canario	Canary Mastiff; Canary Catch Dog; Perro de Presa Canario; Dogo Canario; Canarian Dogo	Canary Islands	Guard dog, catch dog	
Rottweiler		Germany	Guard dog	
Serrano Bulldog	Buldogue Serrano; Brazilian Mountain Bulldog; Mountaineer Bullbog	Brazil	Cattle-herding dog, butcher's dog	
Tosa	Tosa Inu; Tosa Ken; Tosa Tōken; Japanese Mastiff; Japanese Tosa; Japanese Fighting Dog; Tosa Fighting Dog	Japan	Dog fighting	

=== Extinct breeds ===
Breed	Alternate name(s)	Country or region of origin	Era	Use	Image
Alaunt	Alaunt de Boucherie	Europe, Central Asia	Classical antiquity and the Middle Ages	Big-game hunting, guard dog, dog fighting	
Bullenbeisser	Bärenbeisser; German Bulldog	Germany	to World War II	Bull-baiting (as Bullenbeisser), bear-baiting (as Bärenbeisser)	
Córdoba fighting dog	Córdoba dog; Córdobese dog; Perro de Pelea Cordobés	Argentina	to the 1920s	Dog fighting	
Dogo Cubano	Cuban Mastiff; Cuban Bloodhound; Cuban Dogo; Cuban Dogge	Cuba	16th – late 19th c.	Recapturing runaway slaves, bull-baiting, dog fighting	
Fila da Terceira	Terceira Mastiff; Cão de Fila da Terceira; Rabo Torto	Portugal	to the 1970s	Catch dog	
Molossus	Molossian Hound; Epirus Mastiff	Southern Europe	Classical antiquity	War dog, guard dog, big-game hunting, dog fighting	
Old English Bulldog		Great Britain and Ireland	17th–19th c.	Bull-baiting, dog fighting	
Toy Bulldog	Miniature Bulldog; English Toy Bulldog	United Kingdom (England)	18th – early 20th c.	Lap dog	

== Bibliography ==
- Hancock, David (2001). The Mastiffs: The Big Game Hunters – Their History, Development and Future. Ducklington, Oxon: Charwynne Dog Features. ISBN 9780951780114.
- Fogle, Bruce (2009). The Encyclopedia of the Dog. New York: DK Publishing. ISBN 978-0-7566-6004-8.
- Encyclopædia Britannica (2019). "Mastiff: breed of dog". www.britannica.com. Encyclopædia Britannica, Inc.
- Parker, Heidi G. (2012). "Chapter 3: The history and relationship of dog breeds". In Ostrander, Elaine A.; Ruvinsky, Anatoly (eds.). The Genetics of the Dog. Wallingford, Oxfordshire: CAPI books. pp. 38–53. ISBN 9781845939403.
- Oxford Dictionaries (2019). "Mastiff". Lexico.com. Oxford University Press.
- Wynn, M. B. (1886). History of the Mastiff: Gathered from Sculpture, Pottery, Carvings, Paintings and Engravings. Melton Mowbray, William Loxley. ISBN 978-1-4465-4892-9.
- Young, Amy; Bannasch, Danika (2007). "Chapter 4: Morphological variation in the dog". In Ostrander, Elaine A.; Giger, Urs; Lindblad-Toh, Kerstin (eds.). The Dog and its Genome. Cold Spring Harbor, New York: Cold Spring Harbor Laboratory Press. pp. 47–66. ISBN 9780879697815.
