= Dogue Brasileiro =

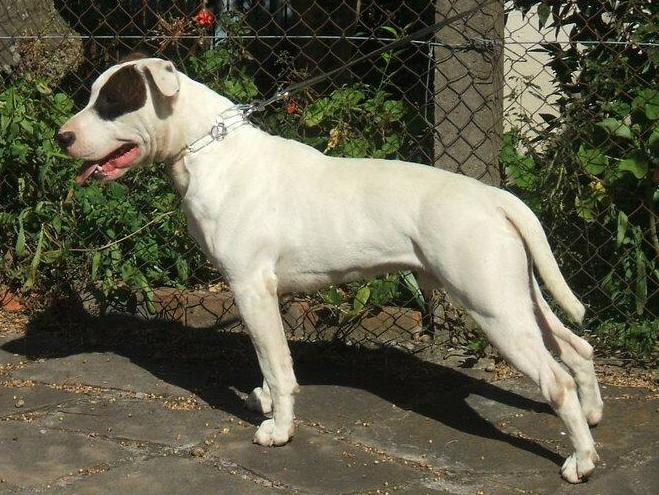
- Dogue Brasileiro
- Origin: Brazil
- Breed status: Not recognized as a breed by any major kennel club.
Traits
Height	Males	54–60 cm (21–24 in)
	Females	50–58 cm (20–23 in)
Weight	Males	29–43 kg (64–95 lb)
	Females	23–39 kg (51–86 lb)
- Coat: Short or medium, dense, hard and shiny coat
- Colour: Any color or combination; either solid, piebald or tricolor
Kennel club standards
- CBKC: standard

The Dogue Brasileiro is a mastiff-type working dog breed originating in Brazil. It is neither recognized by the Fédération Cynologique Internationale (FCI) nor the American Kennel Club (AKC). However, it has the official Brazilian recognition by the Brazilian Confederation of Cynophilia (CBKC) where it belongs to the Group 11 – Breeds not recognized by the FCI.

== History ==
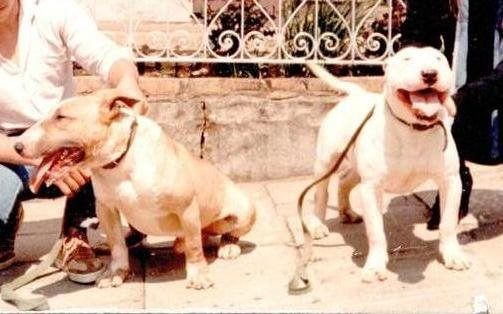
Two Bull Terriers used in the beginning of the breeding process.

The original developer of the breed was a Bull Terrier breeder named Pedro Pessoa Ribeiro Dantas from Caxias do Sul, Rio Grande do Sul. In 1978, his neighbor asked him to mate one of his Bull Terrier males with the neighbor's female Boxer. Pedro took one of the female puppies from this mating, and named her Tigresa after the brindle markings on her coat. As Tigresa grew, she turned out to be a very pleasant and promising individual: she was extremely affectionate, obedient, quick-to-learn, physically balanced, strong, and vigorous. Moreover, she lacked the extreme characteristics typical to the modern Bull Terrier, being much more functional and agile. She was also physically stronger than both an average Bull Terrier and an average Boxer. At the same time she was an excellent guard and very tolerant towards Pedro's Bull Terriers: when they tried to provoke her, she rather eluded the attacks by her better physical agility and balance than by using aggression.

After noticing the great qualities of Tigresa, Pedro started to gather information from other people who had purchased a puppy from the same litter. The response was that the dogs had become physically vigorous and excellent guards, at the same time being gentle and affectionate towards their families. Therefore, another mating between a different Bull Terrier and a Boxer. Because the results turned out to be as positive as in the first litter, a new breeding line was decided to be established and was originally named Bull Boxer (which should not be confused with the English "designer breed" with the same name based on a Staffordshire Bull Terrier x Boxer cross).

After the first generation of Bull Terrier x Boxer crosses consisting of 80 individuals, Pedro continued by occasional matings between these crosses. The qualities and health of the new puppies were followed during their growth. It was noticed that a vast majority of them possessed the following characteristics:

- Extremely efficient guardian
- Balanced temper and extremely attached to his family
- Physically balanced and powerful, with the extreme pain tolerance of the Bull Terrier
- Longevity, lifespan being approximately 13 years

Although the results were promising, Pedro was not yet sure if the same results could also be achieved by using other similar kinds of breeds. Therefore, he crossed several Bull Boxers with the American Staffordshire Terrier and noticed that at least in the first generation, the characteristics remained the same. However, no more American Staffordshire Terrier crosses were made in the following generations and soon the studbook was closed to continue the breeding solely by using already existing Bull Boxers.

The Brazilian Bull Boxer Club was founded in 1986 and its president is Pedro Ribeiro Dantas himself. The breed was officially accepted by the CBKC in 1999 and the today's version of the breed standard was published in 2007. Nowadays there are 2000 pure-bred dogs in the official registry of the Bull Boxer Club – however, the number also includes many dogs that have already died. There are breeders in many different states of Brazil and the breed has grown in popularity since the 1990s. Although the Dogue Brasileiro is not recognized by the FCI, it does not bother Brazilian breeders and fanciers of the breed: actually, the president of the Bull Boxer Club has stated that the FCI's current principles do not meet with the breeding philosophy of the Dogue Brasileiro.

== Appearance ==
The Dogue Brasileiro is a medium-sized, strong, agile and muscular dog, being massive without creating heavy or stocky impression. Males are 54 – 60 cm tall (ideal height 58 cm) and weigh 29 – 43 kg (ideal weight 39 kg); females 50 – 58 cm tall (ideal height 56 cm) and weigh 23 – 39 kg (ideal weight 33 kg). The breed is therefore lighter and athletic, which is equally tall but significantly heavier. There are two coat variants: short (less than 2.5 cm) and medium-length (from 2.5 to 4.7 cm). The texture of the shiny coat is harsh and dense. All colours and combinations are accepted.

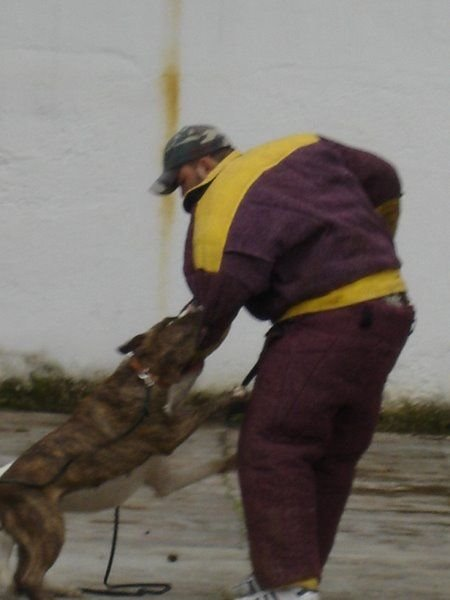
Brindle

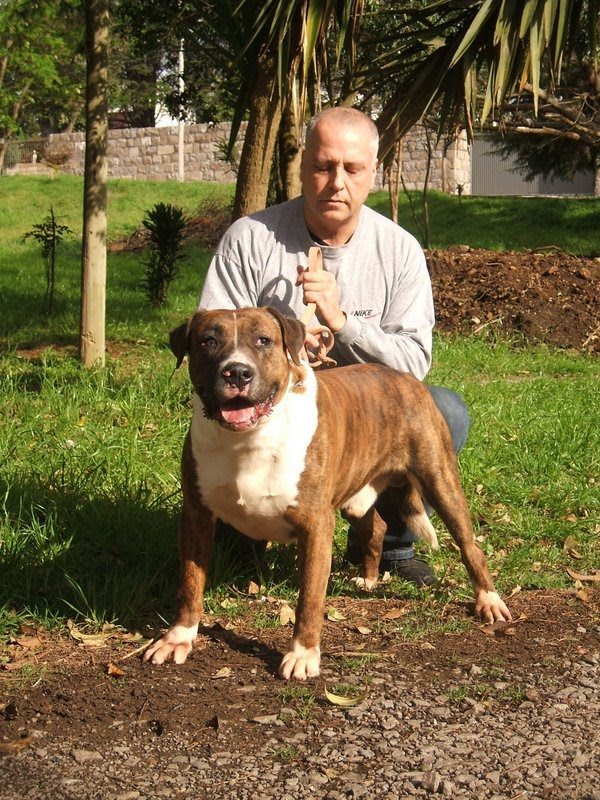
Brindle-and-white

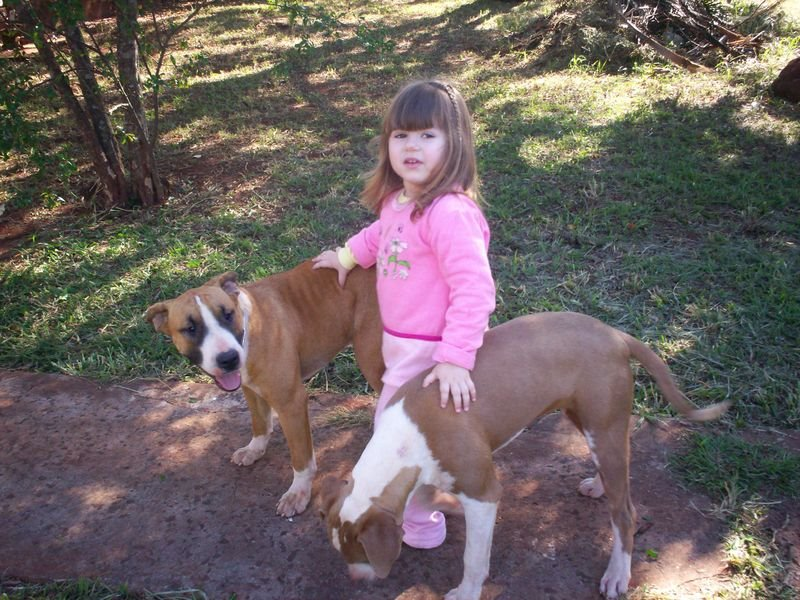
Dogues and kids

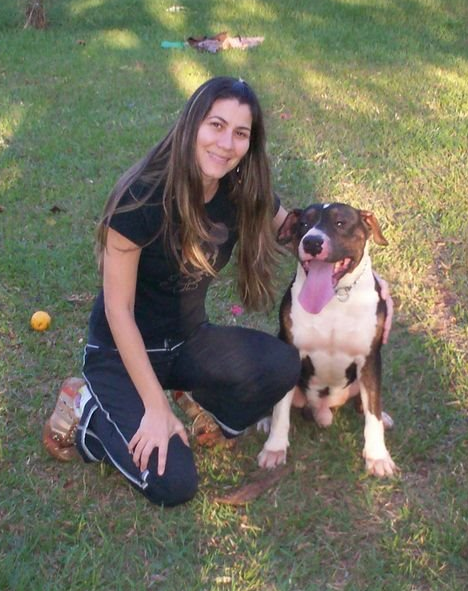
Black-and-tan

== Behavior ==
The Dogue Brasileiro is an active and balanced, yet alert, fearless, and watchful dog with a strong guarding instinct. Towards its family, it is obedient, gentle, and affectionate. However, it is serious towards strangers and will be ready to attack if provoked. It should not demonstrate aggressive behaviour without a clear reason – such as purposeful provocation – not even with other dogs. Instead of the more common working trial, a specific character trial is demanded for the breed to reach championship in Brazilian dog shows.

== Use ==
The Dogue Brasileiro is mainly used as a guard dog and a protection sport dog. Known as The Urban Guardian, the Dogue Brasileiro is a strong and compact dog, adapted to the modern urban environment. The breed was created to be a great guard dog.

== See also ==
- List of dog breeds
- Terrier Brasileiro
- Campeiro Bulldog
- Gaucho sheepdog
- Fila Brasileiro
