= Terceira Mastiff =

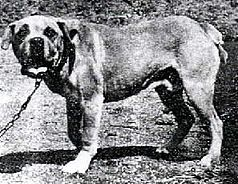
- Original type of the breed
- Other names: Fila da Terceira; Cão de Fila da Terceira
- Common nicknames: Rabo Torto
- Origin: Portugal
- Breed status: Extinct
Traits
- Height: 55 cm (22 in)
- Coat: Short and smooth
- Color: Fawn or yellow; with a light mask

The Terceira Mastiff (Portuguese: Cão de Fila da Terceira) is an extinct Portuguese dog landrace, also known as the Rabo Torto (rabo=tail, torto=curled/twisted).

== History ==
The Terceira Mastiff came from the island of Terceira, located in the Azores, which is the only island where this dog has ever existed and where it was employed as a house guardian. It descended from the Rafeiro do Alentejo.

In the 1960s, there was an attempt to revive the breed with the aid of the Portuguese government. However, there was disagreement between government officials and breeders, which led to the project's failure. After this, the future of the Terceira Mastiff depended solely on local farmers and breed fanciers. By the 1970s, it was already declared extinct.

It is an ancestor to both the Cão Fila de São Miguel and the Fila Brasileiro. This breed is different from the Barbado da Terceira.

== Appearance ==
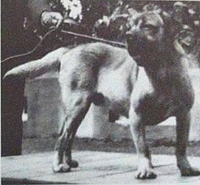
Mastiff-type Terceira Mastiff, 20th century

The Terceira Mastiff was a medium-sized molosser that represented the Fila or Dogo type and resembled the Cão Fila de São Miguel. One of its most remarkable features was an innately short, corkscrew-like tail. Its nose could be either black, brown, or even pink. The colour of the short, smooth coat can be either fawn or yellow, always with a light mask. Red, black and brindle individuals were usually considered to be impure. The height was approximately 55 cm (22 in).
