= Serrano Bulldog =

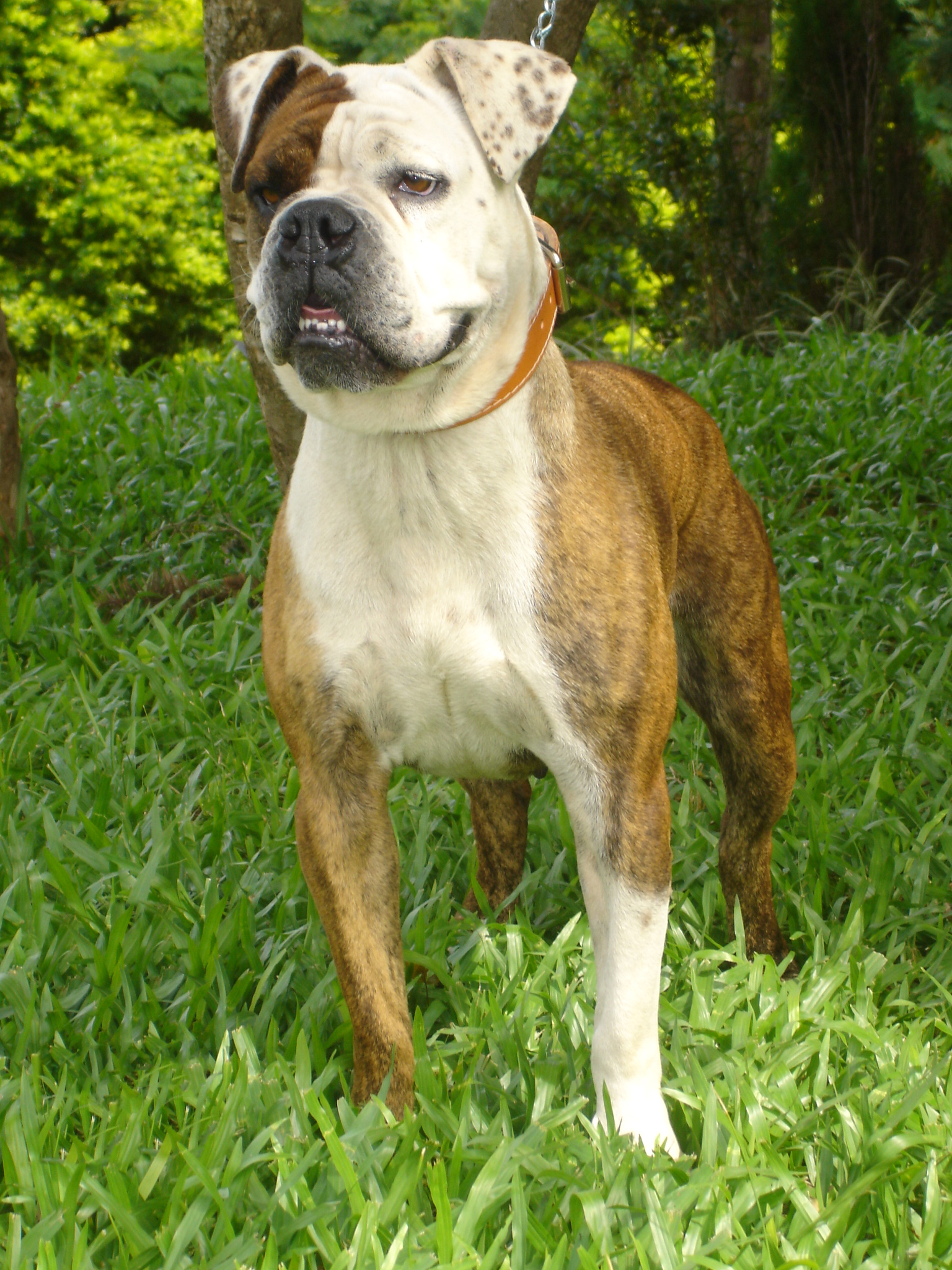
- Other names: Buldogue serrano
- Common nicknames: Brazilian Mountain Bulldog; Mountaineer Bulldog
- Origin: Brazil
Traits
Height	Males	50–56 cm (20–22 in)
	Females	48–53 cm (19–21 in)
Weight	Males	31–40 kg (68–88 lb)
	Females	25–35 kg (55–77 lb)
- Coat: short
- Colour: any
Kennel club standards
- CBKC: standard

The Serrano Bulldog (Portuguese: Buldogue serrano) is a Brazilian dog breed recognized by the Brazilian Confederation of Cynophilia (CBKC).

== Name ==
Serrano is a Portuguese word widely used in Brazil as a term for those who are from regions with hills; it is a synonym of hillside or mountain used as substantive adjectives.

== Temperament ==
A guardian of balanced temperament; does not show gratuitous aggression to people or other dogs, but does not hesitate in attacking under command or when provoked; has extreme submission to its owner.

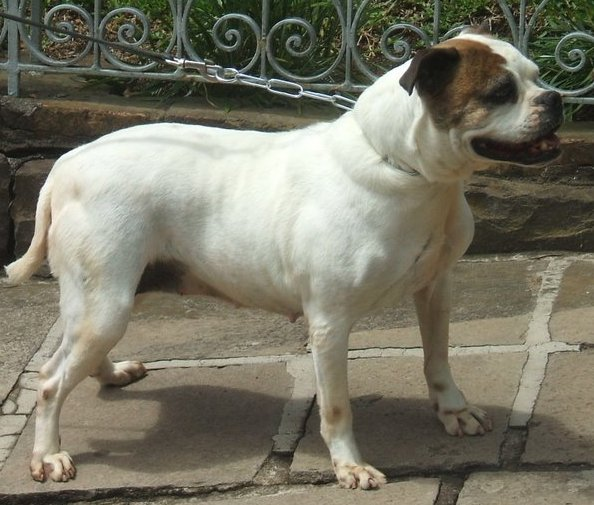
Serrano Bulldog. CBKC model image standard.

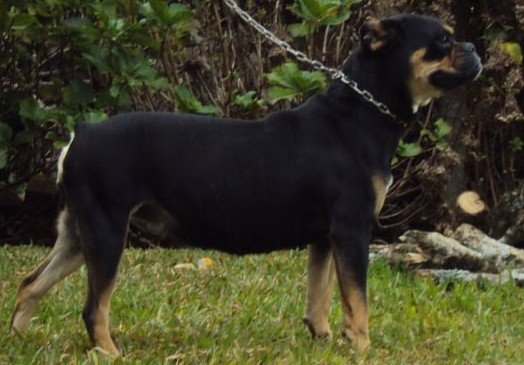
Serrano Bulldog. Black-and-tan female

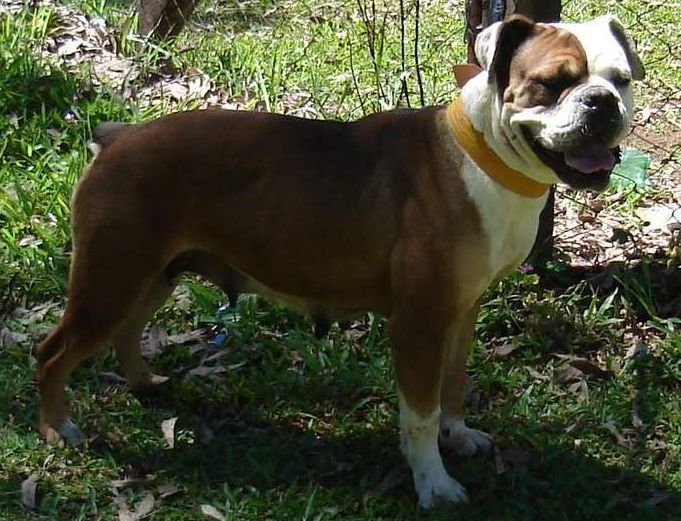
Serrano Bulldog. Adult female

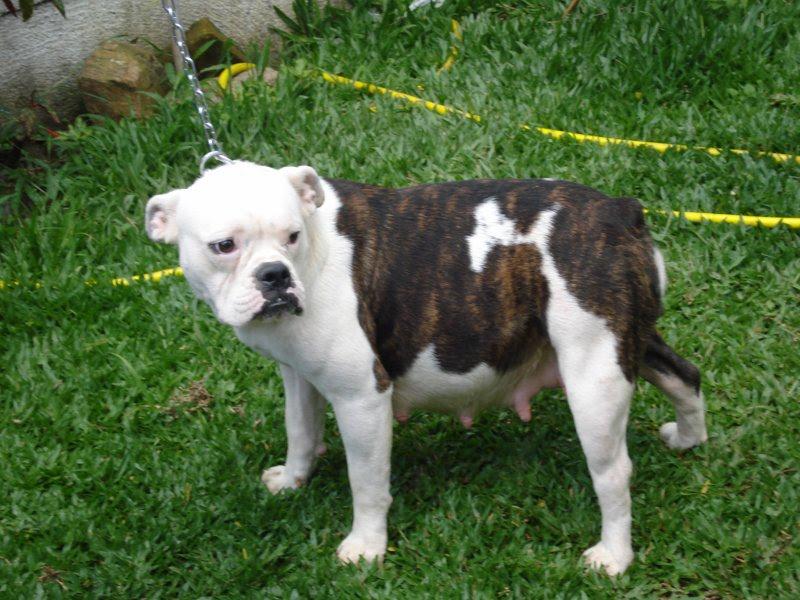
Serrano Bulldog. Pregnant female

== See also ==
- List of dog breeds
- Campeiro Bulldog
- Pampas Deerhound
