= Barbado da Terceira =

Portuguese breed of dog

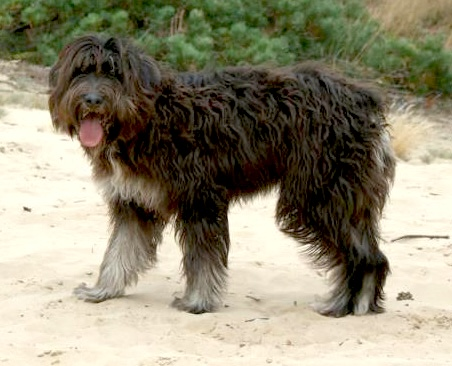
- Origin: Azores, Portugal
Traits
Height	Males	52–58 cm (20–23 in)
	Females	48–54 cm (19–21 in)
Weight	Males	25–30 kg (55–66 lb)
	Females	21–26 kg (46–57 lb)
- Coat: long, wavy double coat
- Colour: yellow, grey, black or fawn with white patches on the chest, belly and tip of the tail
Kennel club standards
- Clube Português de Canicultura: standard

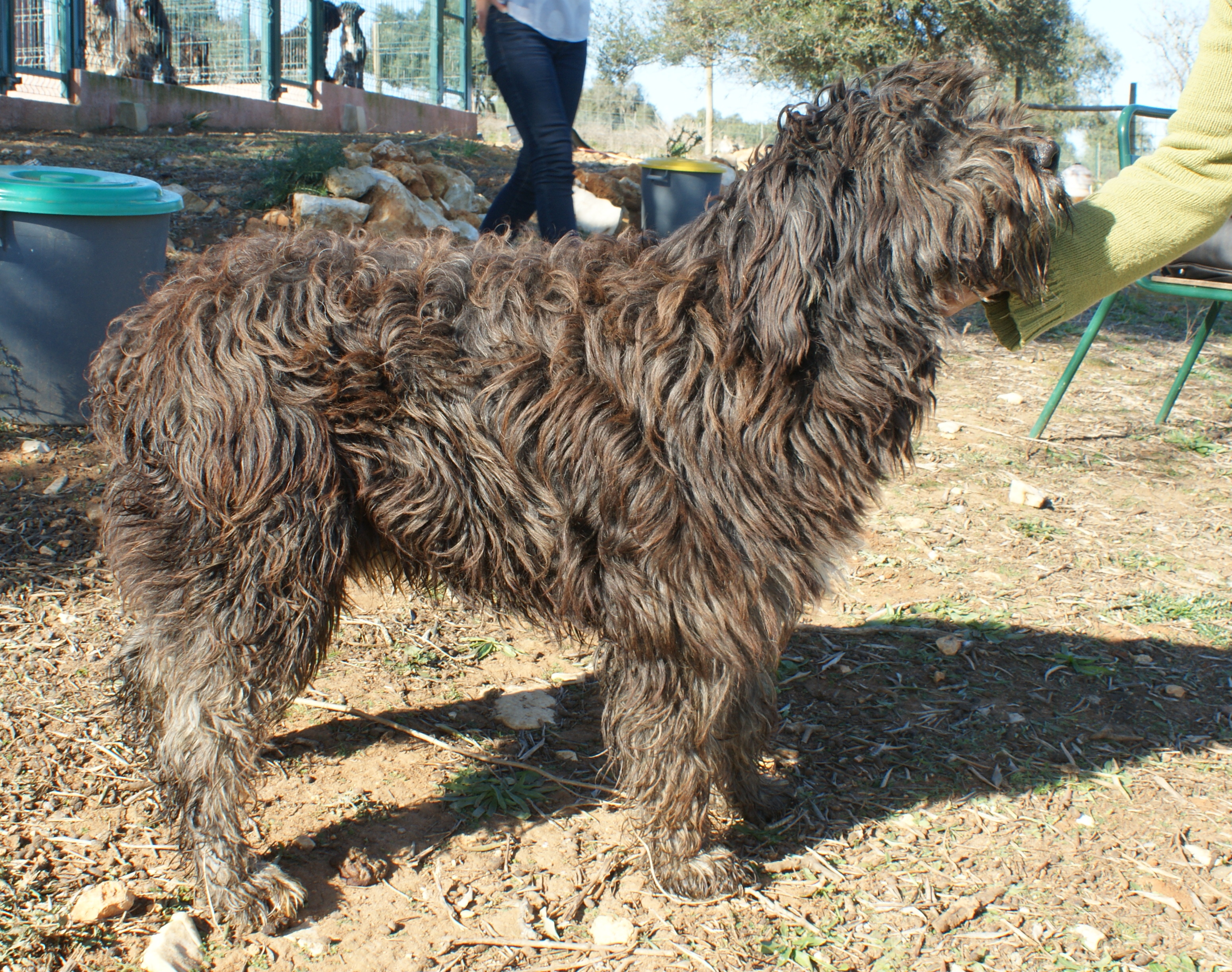
Male

The Barbado da Terceira is Portuguese breed of herding and guard dog from the Atlantic island of Terceira in the Azores, for which it is named. It was recognised by the Clube Português de Canicultura and by the Direcção-Geral de Veterinária of Portugal in 2004. It is not recognised by the Fédération Cynologique Internationale.

== History ==
The Barbado da Terceira derives from the various dogs brought to the Azores by colonists and visitors since settlement of the islands began in the fifteenth century, particularly from those with an aptitude for cattle herding. It was used both as a herding dog and as a guard dog.

It was recognised by the Clube Português de Canicultura and by Direcção-Geral de Veterinária of Portugal in 2004, following a collaboration of the former with the Direcção Regional de Agricultura of Terceira and the University of the Azores. A census in 2005 found 222 of the dogs. A single-breed dog show was held in Terceira in January 2005, with 73 participants.

There are two breed societies: the Associação Açoreana do Cão Barbado da Ilha Terceira in Terra Chã, in the município of Angra do Heroísmo in Terceira, and the Clube Português do Barbado da Terceira in mainland Portugal. In 2024 the Barbado had not been recognised by the Fédération Cynologique Internationale. A small number of the dogs are in the United States, where since 2021 the breed has been included in the Foundation Stock Service of the American Kennel Club.

== Characteristics ==
The Barbado da Terceira is muscular and solidly built. It is of medium size, with a median height at the withers of some 55 cm and median body weight of about 25 kg; body length is slightly greater than height. The coat is long, thick, and wavy, with a thick under-coat; hair is thick on the head, particularly under the jaw, where it forms the beard from which the name of the breed derives. The coat may be yellow, grey, black, fawn or wolf-grey in any shade, with or without white markings.
