= Brazilian Terrier =

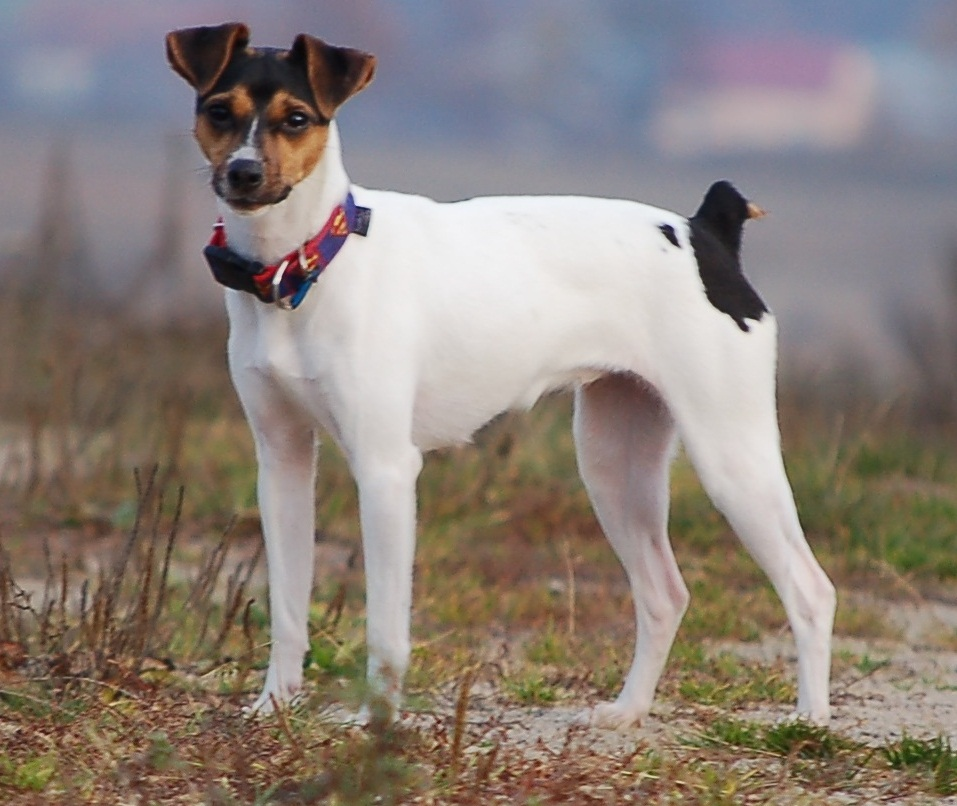
- Brazilian Terrier
- Other names: Fox Paulistinha; Terrier Brasileiro
- Origin: Brazil
Traits
Height	Males	35–40 cm (14–16 in)
	Females	33–38 cm (13–15 in)
- Weight: 10 kg (22 lb) approximately.
- Coat: Short, smooth and fine.
- Colour: White with tan markings and the main colours black, brown, blue or isabela
Kennel club standards
- CBKC: standard
- Fédération Cynologique Internationale: standard

The Brazilian Terrier is a breed of dog developed in Brazil. It is one of several terriers and one of the two worldwide recognized native breeds of Brazil.

== Description ==
=== Origin ===
One theory about the origin of the breed is that Jack Russell Terriers, Parson Russell Terriers and Fox Terriers were brought to Brazil from Europe in the 1800s and served as the nearest ancestor of the Brazilian Terrier. Another theory is that the breed is derived from Spanish breeds such as the Ratonero Bodeguero Andaluz and Valencian Terrier brought to Brazil in vessels during the period of the Iberian Union.

=== Appearance ===
This terrier stands between 13–16 in (35.5-40.5 cm) at the withers. The breed generally weighs between 15-22 lbs (7–10 kg). Its coat is short, sleek, and fine. The coloring is always tri-color (white, tan and black or white, tan and blue or white, tan and brown). A docked tail, narrow chest, flat triangular skull and a well balanced body are the most common characteristics. The ears are half-pricked and folded, with the tip falling down.

== See also ==
- List of dog breeds
- Japanese Terrier
- Fila Brasileiro
- Campeiro Bulldog
- Ratonero Bodeguero Andaluz
