= Alapaha Blue Blood Bulldog =

American bulldog breed

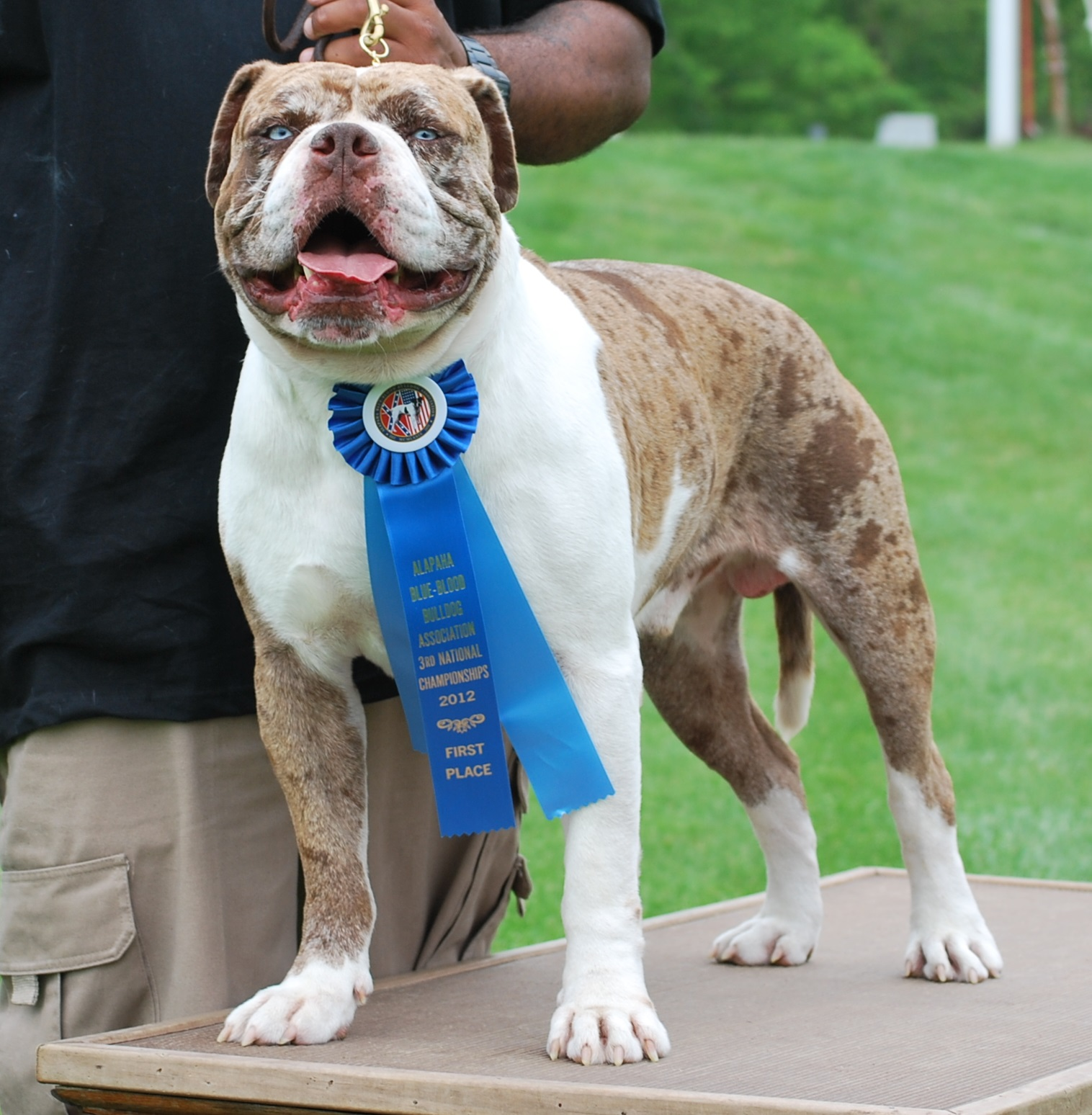
- Common nicknames: Otto
- Origin: United States
- Foundation stock: Old English Bulldog
- Breed status: Not recognized as a breed by any major kennel club.
Traits
- Height: 20–25 in (51–64 cm)
- Weight: 50–90 lb (23–41 kg)
- Coat: Short
- Color: White patched with black, blue, buff or brown

The Alapaha Blue Blood Bulldog is a breed of bulldog from the United States, and it is predominantly used as a guard dog. It is a muscular breed, with a large head and brachycephalic muzzle. The hair coat is short, typically colored white with black, blue, buff or brown patches, and its tail is kept un-docked. Sexual dimorphism is common in the breed, with male dogs being typically twice the weight of females.

== History ==
The Alapaha Blue Blood Bulldog is a rare breed that is believed to be descended from Old English Bulldogs that were brought to the Americas in the 18th century. They were previously used in the blood sports of bull baiting and bear baiting; later, they were used as cattle and pig herders. For multiple generations, the breed was bred solely by the Lane family of Rebecca, Georgia. They eventually started a breed registry with a dog named Otto, the foundation dog of the family's breeding operation. The dog's name has occasionally been used as a nickname for the breed. In the early 21st century, there were an estimated 120 to 150 extant Alapaha Blue Blood Bulldogs.

== See also ==
- List of dog breeds
- American bulldog
