= Belgian Mastiff =

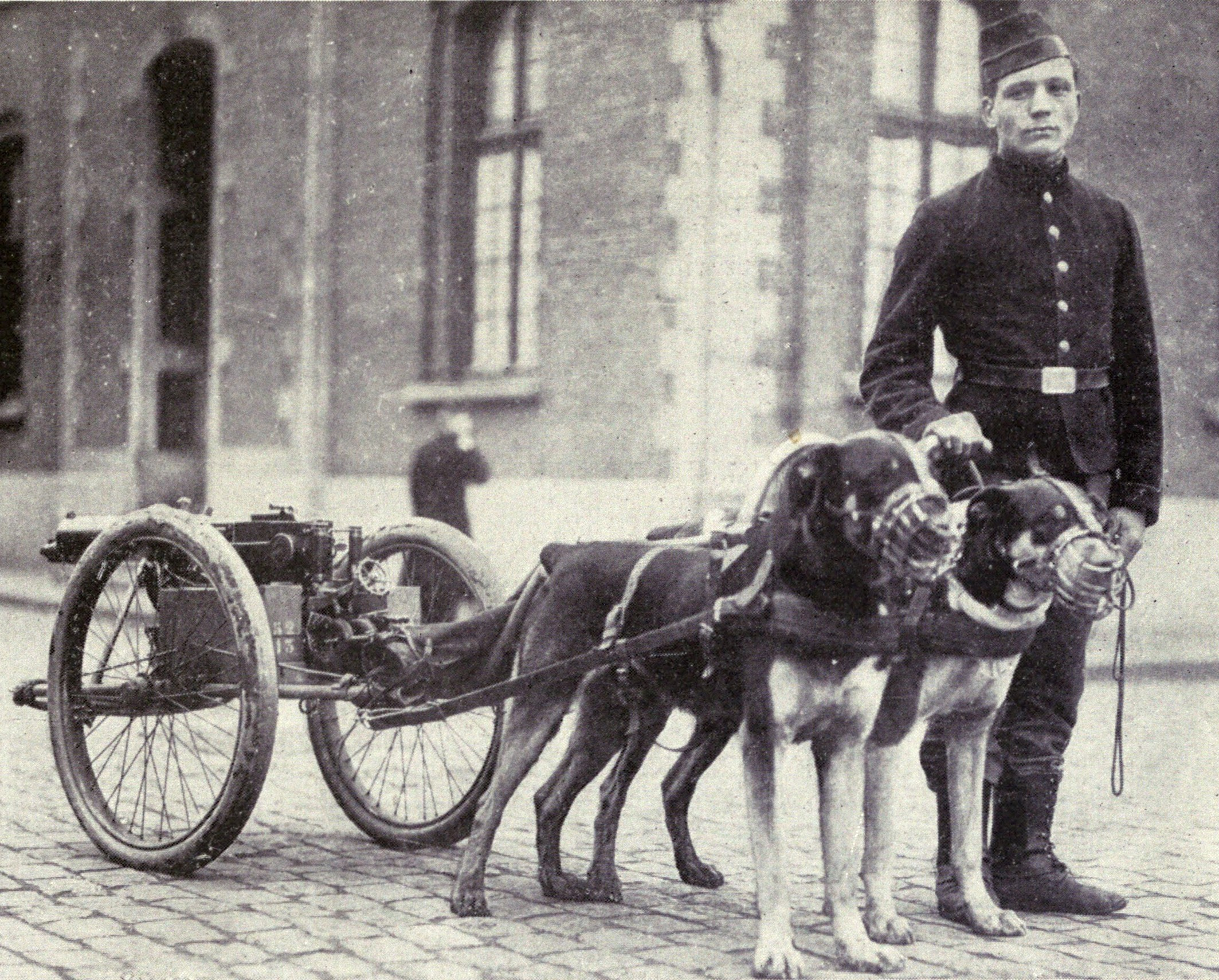

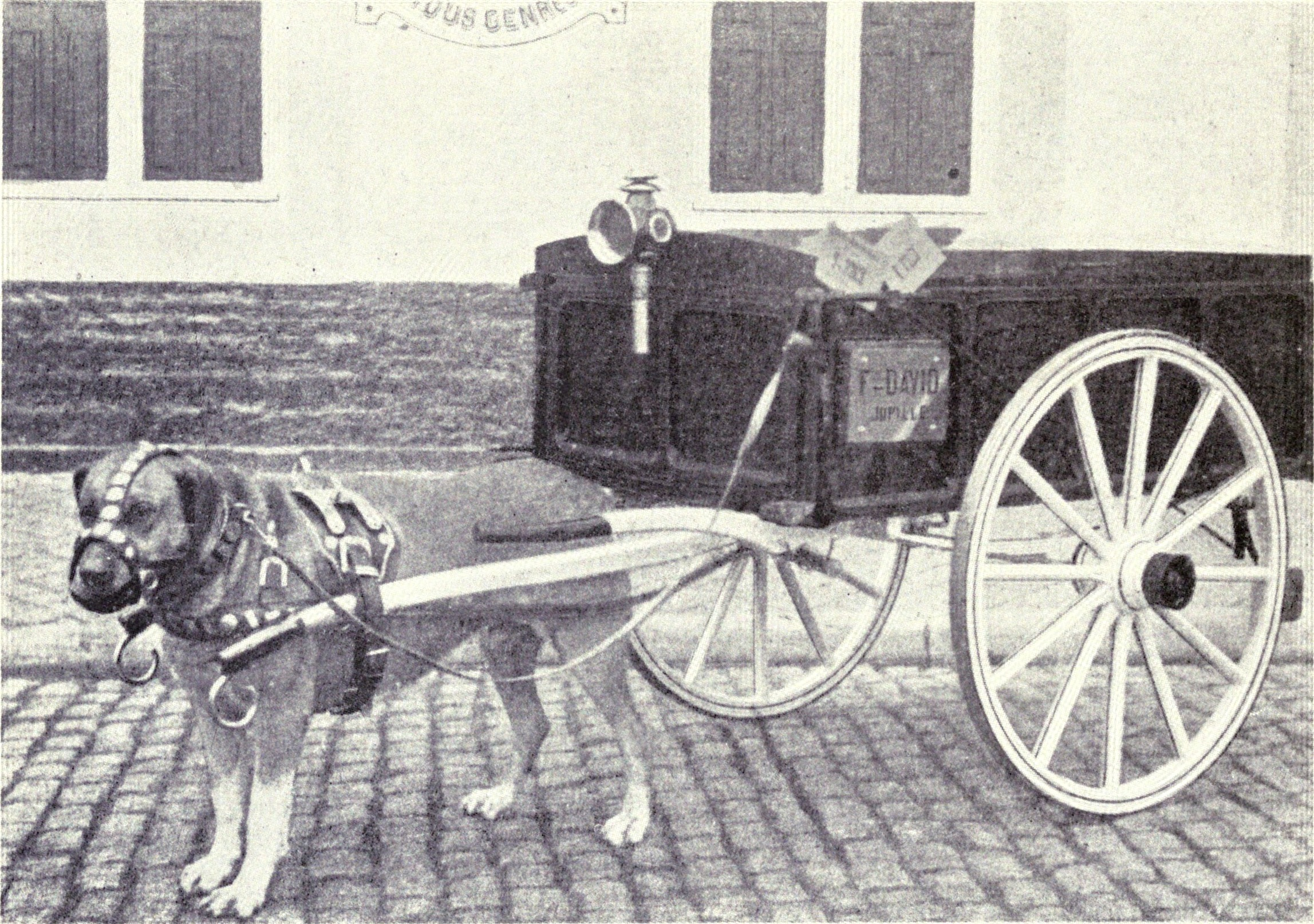
- Other names: Chien de Trait Belge; Mâtin Belge; Belgian Draught Dog; Vlaamsche Trekhond
- Origin: Belgium and the Netherlands
- Breed status: Extinct
Traits
- Height: 69–78 cm (27–31 in)
- Weight: 45–50 kg (99–110 lb)
- Coat: Short, smooth and loose fitting
- Colour: Fawn or brindle with dark mask and occasionally white markings

The Belgian Mastiff, also known as the Chien de Trait Belge, Mâtin Belge and Belgian Draught Dog, was a breed of mastiff-type dog from the Low Countries that was used as a draught dog.

== Description ==
The Belgian Mastiff was a large, powerful dog that stood between 69 and 78 centimetres (27 and 31 in) and weighed between 45 and 50 kilograms (99 and 110 lb). The breed was muscular and heavy-boned with a large head and thick neck. Their tails were typically docked to prevent them from being damaged whilst pulling carts. The Belgian Mastiff's coat was short, smooth and loose fitting; they were typically fawn or brindle in colour, with dark masks and white markings also known.

In character, the Belgian Mastiff was described as a tireless worker with strong protective instincts; they were not known to be particularly friendly to anyone but their masters.

== History ==
Little is known about the Belgian Mastiff's ancestry except that it is believed to be descended from French mastiffs introduced to the Low Countries at some point. The breed was seen throughout Belgium and the Netherlands pulling carts, often delivering milk, butter, meats and vegetables.

The Belgian Mastiff's role as a draught animal became increasingly obsolete throughout the 20th century and the ravages of the two world wars further took their toll on the breed. It is believed it became extinct in the second half of the 20th century. Prior to its extinction, the breed was recognised by the Société Royale Saint-Hubert and the Fédération Cynologique Internationale, in recognition of its supposed extinction the Fédération Cynologique Internationale has placed the breed on its suspended breeds register and the Société Royale Saint-Hubert stated it "may be extinct"; holding out hope that surviving specimens may be found, they maintain the breed's listing.

== See also ==
- List of dog breeds
