= Attack dog =

Dogs trained to attack people

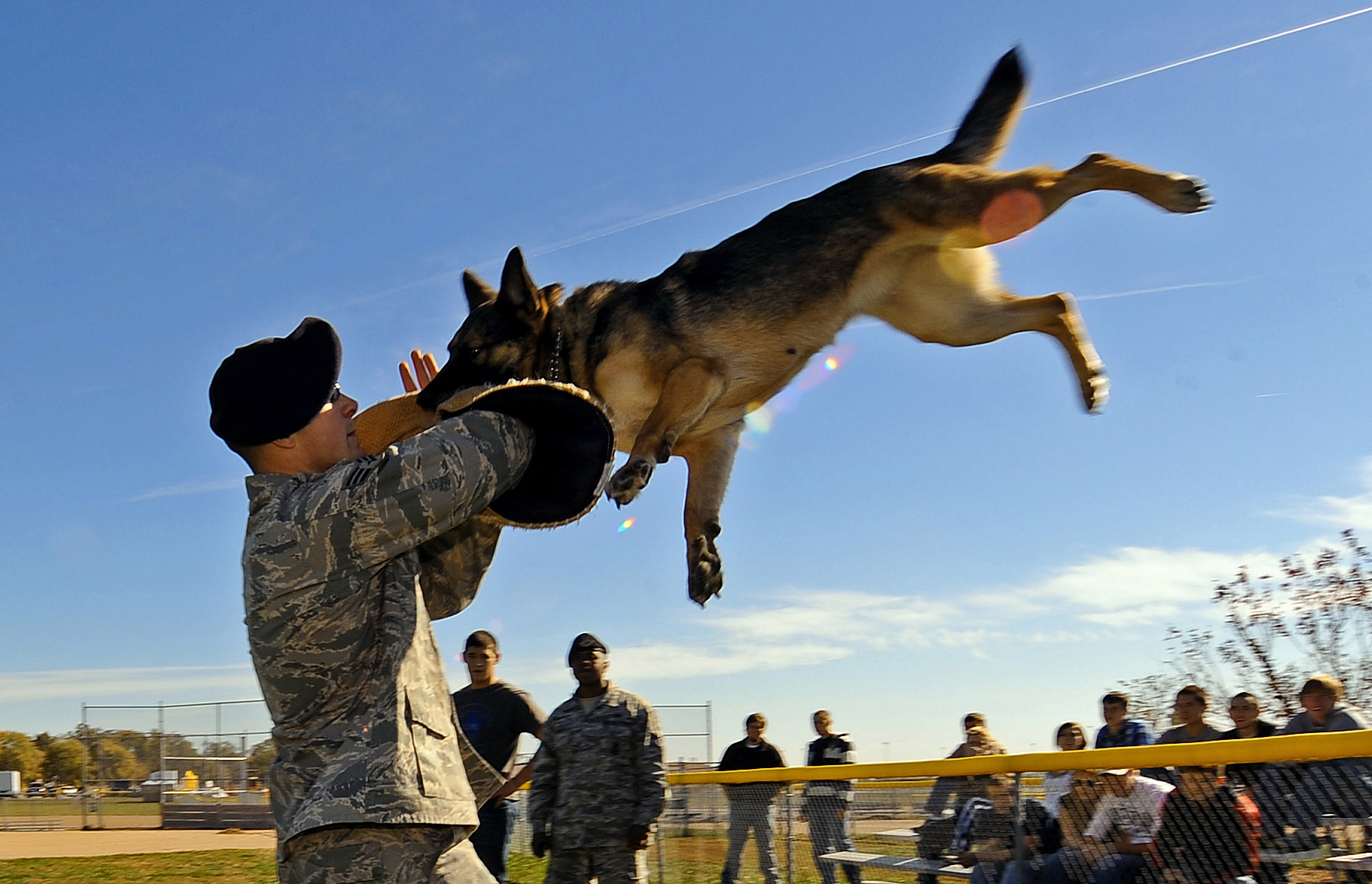
Attack dog demonstration

An attack dog (also known as a patrol dog or security dog) is a dog trained to attack a person on command, sight, or by inferred provocation. They are used to defend people, territory, or property. Attack dogs have been utilized throughout history and are used today primarily in police and military roles. They have also been involved in a number of dog-related incidents and fatalities.

== History ==
Early in recorded history, there are records of dogs being trained for the purpose of attacking a target. One of the most well-recorded ancient uses was in a battle between the Athenians and Corinthians, in which dogs were used to keep watch over a fortress and despite being unsuccessful in opposing an enemy attack, were able to alert the sleeping soldiers to the attack. Ancient Romans first adopted the use of dogs as a weapon after hordes of dogs delayed their victory in the Battle of Vercellae. The Romans not only trained them to attack, but also bred their attack dogs for ferocity. The effect of this was documented by Roman naturalist and writer Pliny the Elder, who wrote that the animals would not back down, even when confronted by swords. The Roman attack dogs were given metal armour covered in razor-sharp spikes, designed to force the enemy out of formation.

Napoleon utilised dogs for their superior senses, putting them to work in roles similar to that of modern sentry dogs. The first use of attack dogs in the United States of America was suggested by Benjamin Franklin. In South Africa under Apartheid, the South African Defence Force used wolf-dog hybrids as experimental attack dogs to combat guerrillas.

== Training ==
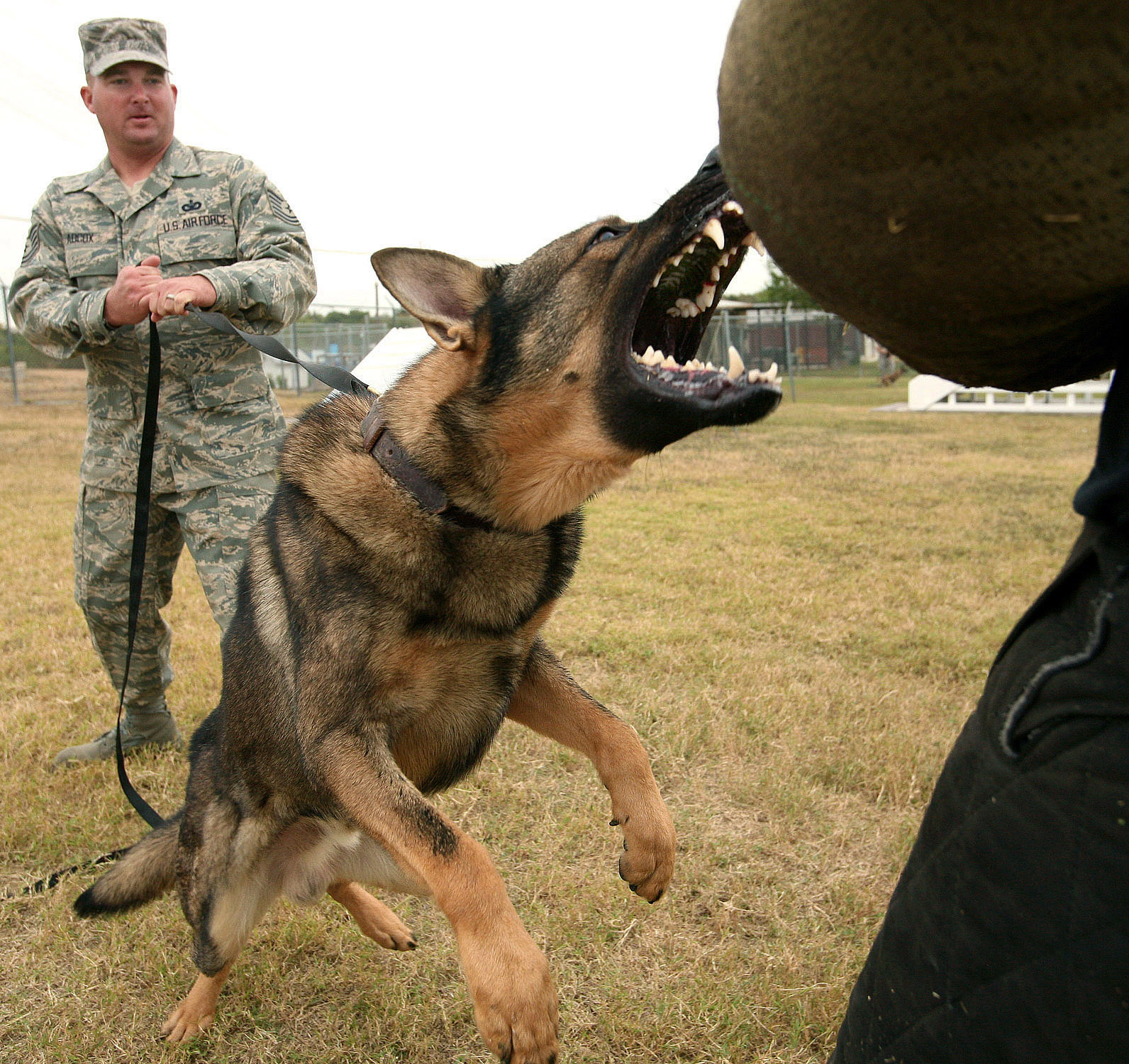
German Shepherd undergoing military training

Attack dog training is a variation of sentry dog training, only instead of bringing attention to an intruder, is trained to chase, hold and injure, or possibly kill, a perceived hostile target. Attack dogs are trained to interpret a situation and react accordingly. In formal training, the dogs are exposed to gunfire, traffic and other distractions to increase their effectiveness. Attack training is condemned by some as promoting ferocity in dogs; a 1975 American study showed that 10% of dogs that have bitten a person received attack dog training at some point. Dogs trained for military use as attack dogs, most often called patrol dogs, can be trained to perform explosives detection as well. Military contractors have been supplying the Department of Defense with nearly as many patrol and explosives detection dogs as the government trains in the recent wars in the Middle East.

== Uses ==
Various modern military groups also use attack dogs, primarily for sentry purposes. The dogs are trained to defend their post and attack any possible intruders. It is also reported that dogs have been used in psychological torture against prisoners of war.

Attack dogs are used by almost every police force in the world for apprehending and subduing targets (see police dog). The dogs are trained to identify situations where humans are in danger and respond accordingly.

Dogs are also commonly used by criminal syndicates, such dogs are often called "gang dogs". They are often used for guarding illegal narcotics operations, intimidating people to facilitate deals and collect debts, defending gang members and turf against law enforcement, and as attack dogs to intimidate and attack rival criminals. Today attack or guard dogs with military-level training may also be used outside the military by individuals or families. These elite dogs may cost hundreds of thousands of U.S. dollars.

== See also ==
- Dogs in warfare
- Guard dog
- Schutzhund
- Dog attack
