= Saint Miguel Cattle Dog =

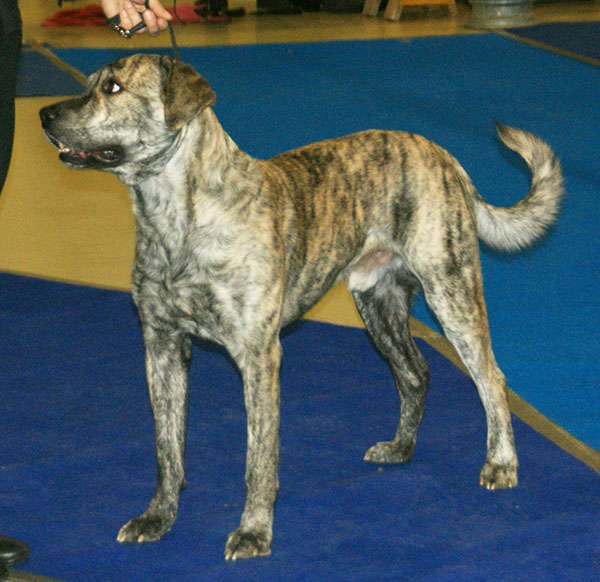
- Male Fawn Brindle
- Other names: Cão de fila de São Miguel, São Miguel cattle dog, São Miguel catch dog, Azores cattle dog, Azores cow dog
- Origin: São Miguel Island, Portugal
Kennel club standards
- Fédération Cynologique Internationale: standard

The Saint Miguel Cattle Dog (Portuguese: cão fila de São Miguel [ˈkɐ̃w ˈfilɐ ðɨ ˈsɐ̃w miˈɣɛl], literally 'catch dog of São Miguel') is a dog breed of mastiff type originating on São Miguel Island in the Azores, an island chain which is one of the autonomous regions of Portugal. The breed was originally used as a herding dog for working with cattle.

== Appearance ==
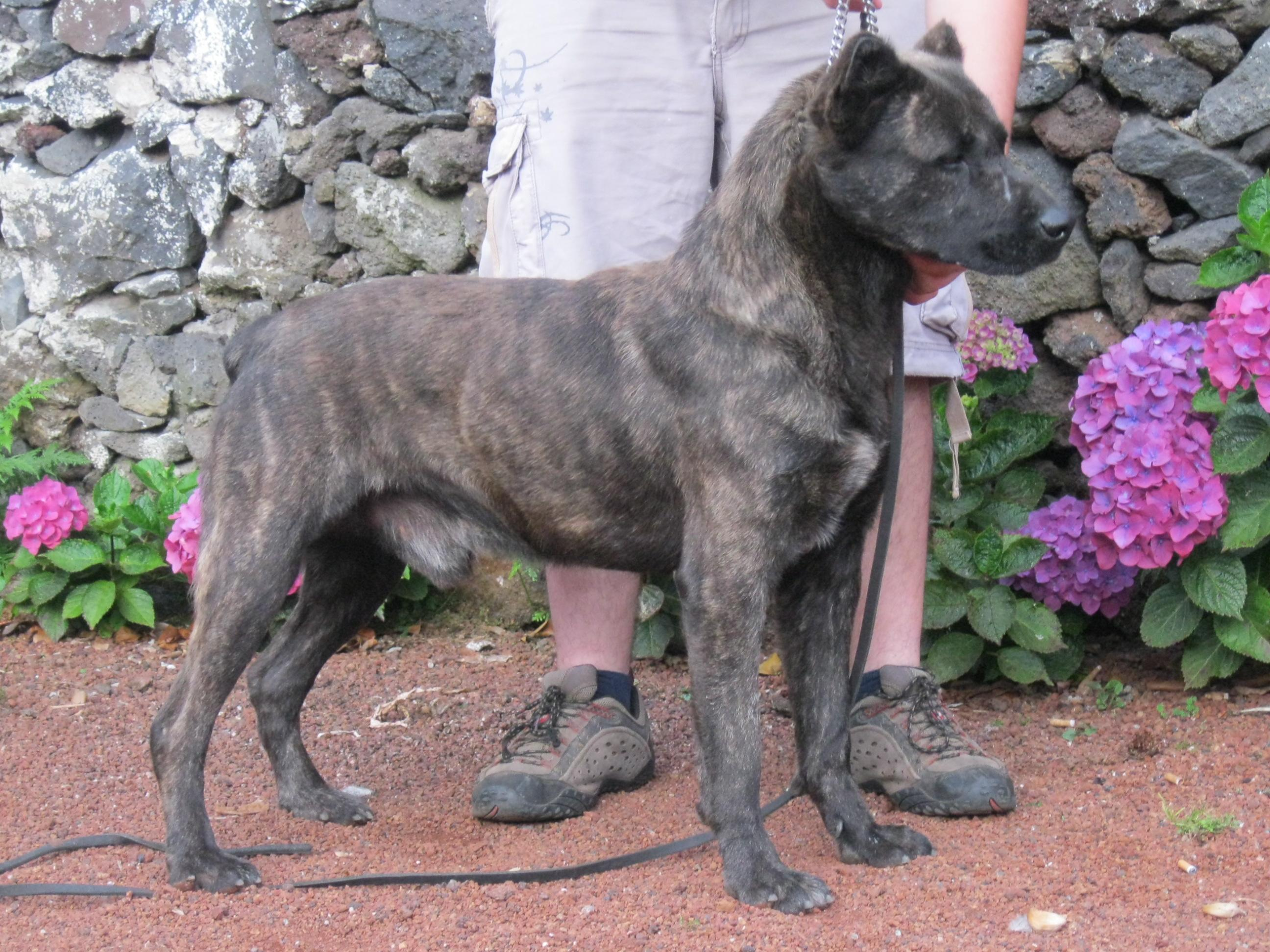
Male with cropped ears and docked tail

The breed is large but not over-sized; up to a maximum of 60 cm (23.6 ins) at the withers and 35 kg (77 lbs) in weight, with females slightly smaller. The general appearance is of a normally proportioned, deep chested, muscular dog with a broad head and medium length neck, straight back, and long legs. The tail is held up and is slightly curved. The breed has drop ears, unless they are cropped. The coat is a brindle of brown (pale brown is described as fawn) or grey, with black; it is short, smooth and harsh to the touch, with a short fringe on the tail (if undocked) and on the backs of the rear legs.

== History ==
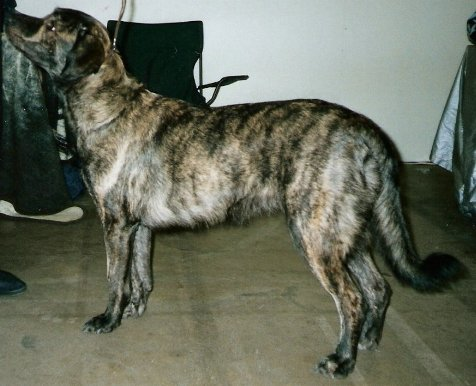
Female with natural tail and ears (undocked/uncropped)

The breed originated from São Miguel Island in the Azores, and has links to the extinct Terceira Mastiff from neighbouring Terceira Island. Its existence has been documented since the early 19th century.

A breed standard was developed and first published in 1984. This standard was recognised internationally in 1995 when the standard was published by the FCI, with the English name Saint Miguel Cattle Dog. Although described (and formerly used) as a cattle dog, the breed is actually a mastiff, and is thus recognised by the FCI in its "Group 2, Section 2, Molossoid breeds" as breed number 340.

Traditionally, the tail is docked, and the ears cropped and rounded off on top, although these practices are now illegal in many areas.

Today, dogs from São Miguel are exported to North America and other areas of the world where they are bred and promoted for the rare breed market. Minor kennel clubs, and registries maintained by individual breeders, write their own versions of the breed standard, which may vary from the breed standard developed on the island of São Miguel and recognised internationally by the FCI. Dogs of the breed may be sold under the original breed name, cão de fila de São Miguel, or any of the many translations and versions of the name in various languages. The breed is known as the Azores Cattle Dog in the U.S. and England.

== Temperament ==
Although the breed is a medium-sized working dog in origin, the actual suitability of an individual dog for a particular kind of work may depend on the quality of early training. This breed is said to be intelligent and to bond strongly with its keepers and to generally be gentle, even docile, when trained well. However, temperaments of individual dogs may vary greatly.

=== Activities ===
Saint Miguel Cattle Dogs can compete in dog agility trials, obedience, flyball, tracking, and herding events. Herding instincts and trainability can be measured at non-competitive herding tests. Individuals exhibiting basic herding instincts can be trained to compete in herding trials.

== Health ==
Specimens from Portugal have no documented health problems, but dogs bred elsewhere are often bred to be very oversized for the breed (over 60 cm/23.6 in and 35 kg/77 lb) and may suffer ailments particular to deep-chested, very large dogs, such as bloat.
