= Fila Brasileiro =

Brazilian breed of dog

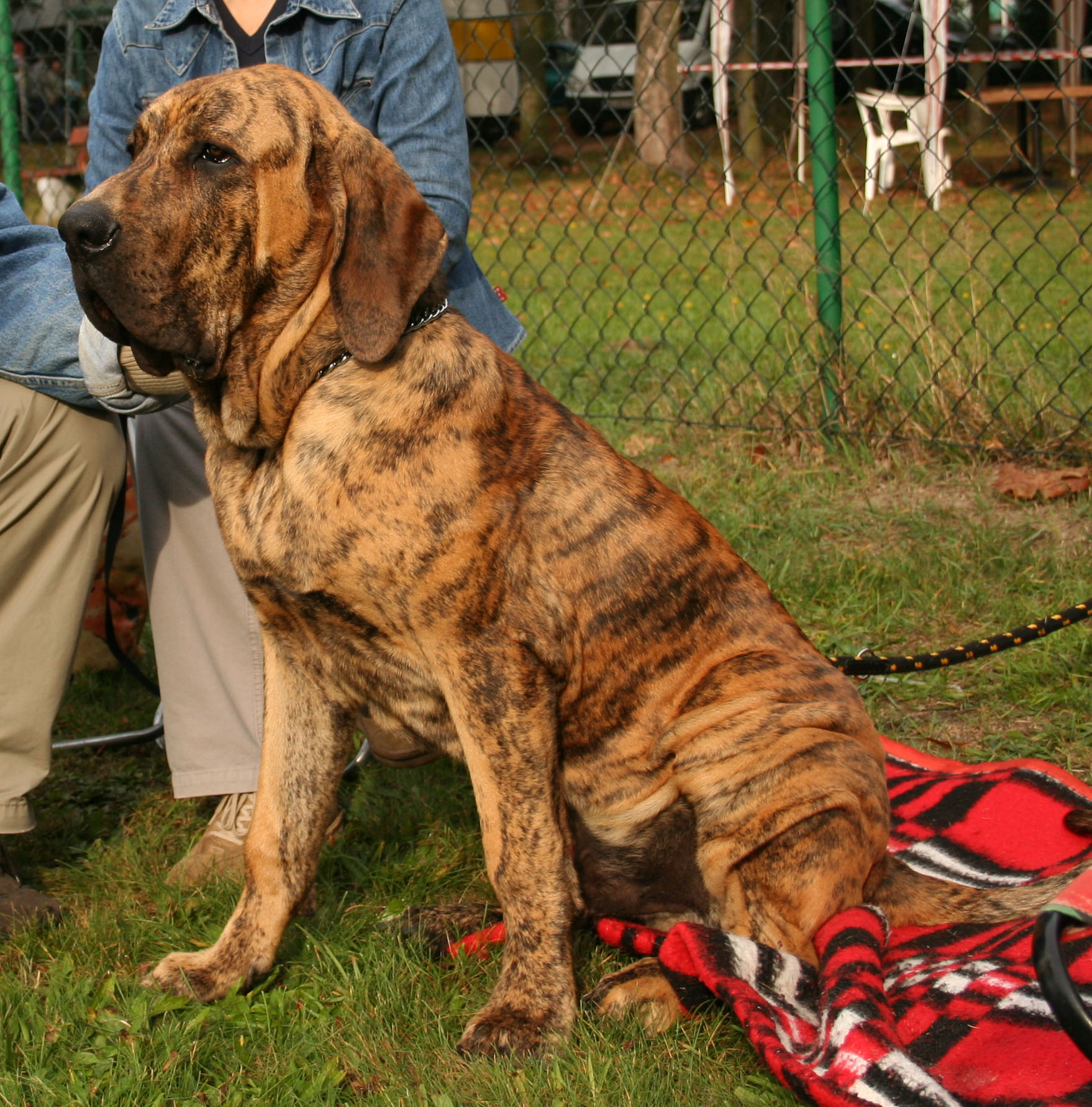
- Origin: Brazil
Traits
Height	Males	65–75 cm (26–30 in)
	Females	60–70 cm (24–28 in)
Weight	Males	over 50 kg (110 lb)
	Females	over 40 kg (88 lb)
- Coat: short
- Colour: brindle, fawn, black
Kennel club standards
- Confederação Brasileira de Cinofilia: standard
- Fédération Cynologique Internationale: standard

The Fila Brasileiro (Portuguese pronunciation: [ˈfilɐ bɾaziˈlejɾu]) is a Brazilian breed of large working dog of mastiff type.

It is used as a guard dog, for cattle herding and for big-game hunting; it may also be kept as a companion dog or pet. In the eighteenth century, when slavery was still legal in Brazil, the Fila Brasileiro was used to return escaped slaves to their owners.

== Etymology ==
The verb "filar" in Portuguese literally means "to hold, arrest, grab". So "cão de fila" (fila dog) or "cão de filar" suggests that it is a catch dog, a dog that "bites and does not loosen its grip". A similar name is also found in two Portuguese dog breeds: the Cão de Fila de São Miguel and the extinct Cão de Fila da Terceira.

== History ==
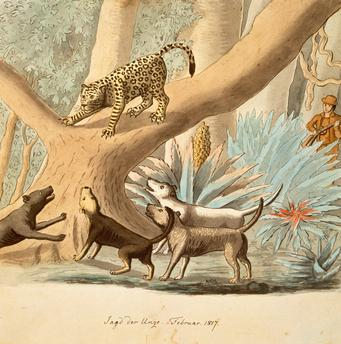
Dogs hunting a jaguar in Brazil, by Maximilian zu Wied-Neuwied.

The Fila Brasileiro is thought to descend from European dogs brought to Brazil during the Colonial period, with little or no influence from indigenous South American dogs from the Pre-Cabraline era.

The Fila Brasileiro were bred and raised primarily on large plantations and cattle farms where they originated. In addition to cattle, jaguars, and other animals, these dogs were taught to chase down fugitive slaves.

The first written standard of the breed was edited in 1946. The Paulistas were responsible for organizing a planned breeding program and opening a stud book to register dogs. Paulo Santos Cruz began to systematically breed the Fila Brasileiro and also contributed to setting the CAFIB standard.

== Appearance ==
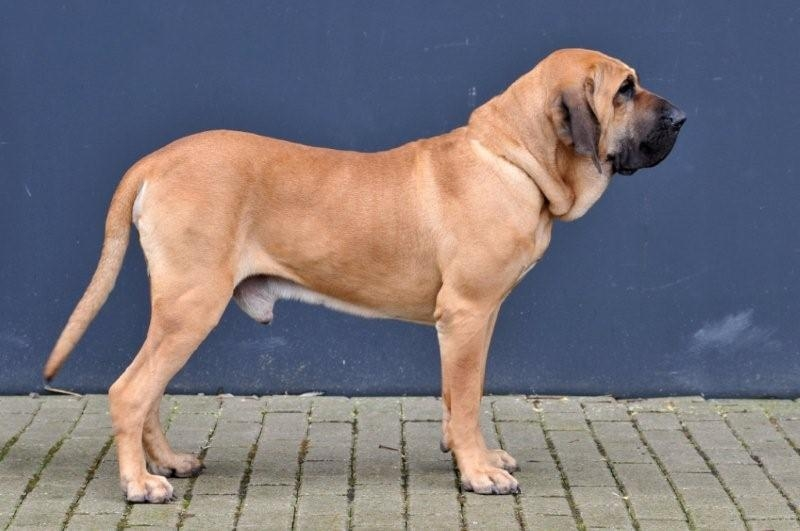
Adult Fila Brasileiro

Superficially, the Fila Brasileiro resembles the Bloodhound–which was also once used to find and return escaped slaves, albeit in the United States–on account of its low-hanging ears, facial appearance, thick skin around the neck, and general sandy or fawn coat. However, the Fila Brasileiro is distinct, being stronger, stockier, and larger, overall, being bigger-boned and taller. The breed also typically displays more variety of coat colorations than the Bloodhound, often possessing black, fawn (red, apricot, or darker) and brindled (fawn, black, or brown brindle) coats, all of which are permitted in shows–with the exception of mouse-grey, black-and-tan, blue, dappled or solid white. Brindles of a basic color may show striping of varying intensity. Sometimes a black mask is present. White markings not exceeding one-quarter of the total coat surface area are permitted on the feet, chest and tail tip, as per the FCI standard. In its native Brazil, the Fila Brasileiro has two main standards, imposed by two distinct clubs: the Confederação Brasileira de Cinofilia (affiliated with FCI) and the Clube de Aprimoramento do Fila Brasileiro. The latter group's standard was constructed based on the "ancient phenotype" of the breed. However, the current CBKC/FCI standard is the best-known and accepted, internationally.

According to the international breed standard, the dogs should stand between 65 and 75 cm (26 and 30 in) at the withers and weigh no less than 50 kg (110 lb); bitches are slightly smaller, standing some 60–70 cm (24–28 in) and weighing at least 40 kg (88 lb). They will have a rectangular build and, though they are massive, their natural agility is apparent. The head is big and heavy, with a deep muzzle. The ears are large, thick, tapered and either droop or fold-back, exposing the interior, according to the individual dog's mood. The neck and back are well-muscled and the chest is broad and deep. Unlike the vast majority of canines, the croup is higher than the withers. The legs are heavily boned. The skin is very distinctive of the breed, being thick and loose all over the body, mainly in the region around the neck. The thick skin forms pronounced dewlaps. In many individuals, these dewlaps continue down to the chest and abdomen. Some dogs show a fold at the side of the head and also at the withers descending to the shoulders. The coat of the Fila Brasileiro is short and dense, while the texture is normally smooth and soft.

The CAFIB standard does not accept black, mouse-grey, black and tan, blue, or dappled coats, as it considers these colours a sign of crossbreeding; on the other hand, it accepts dogs with larger white markings on any part of the body.

== Standards ==
In Brazil, the Fila Brasileiro can be bred within three different standards proposed by three separate clubs. The standard imposed by the CBKC (a club affiliated to the FCI) is the most popular in the world, but it is by far the most distant from the appearance of the old dogs of four decades ago.

The other two standards are from CAFIB (Fila Brasileiro's Enhancement Club) and AMFIBRA (World Association of Dog Breeders of Fila Brasileiro), respectively. Both are based on the first breed standard elaborated by Paulo Santos Cruz, the man who is considered the "father of the breed". However, the CAFIB standard is the most popular of the two. But both clubs (CAFIB and AMFIBRA) present themselves with the aim to preserve the pure Fila with the closest appearance of the old dogs.

This big difference between the three standards is mainly due to an accusation of a scandal of crossbreeding at the dogs registered by the CBKC in the 70's, 80's and 90's and, consequently, the many changes made in the CBKC standard probable to include dogs with characteristics of foreign breeds, such as the English Mastiff, Great Dane and Neapolitan Mastiff.

Paulo Santos Cruz himself, who even participated in the formation of the CAFIB for these same reasons and even presided over the club, published an article in 1979 explaining how to differentiate a pure Fila from a mixed one.

== Legal status ==
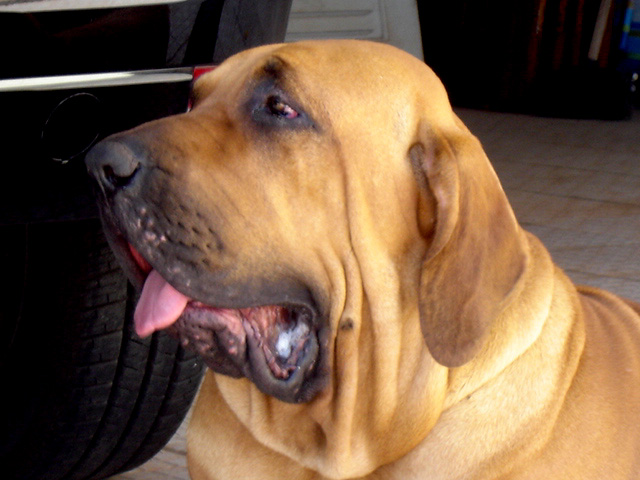
Fila Brasileiro

In Fiji, the United Kingdom, Norway, Australia, Hong Kong and Cyprus, it is illegal to own any of these dogs without specific exemption from a court. In Turkey, it is illegal to own and breed a Fila Brasileiro. It is automatically classified as a dangerous dog in Trinidad and Tobago, meaning they cannot be imported and males must be neutered.
