= Bullenbeisser =

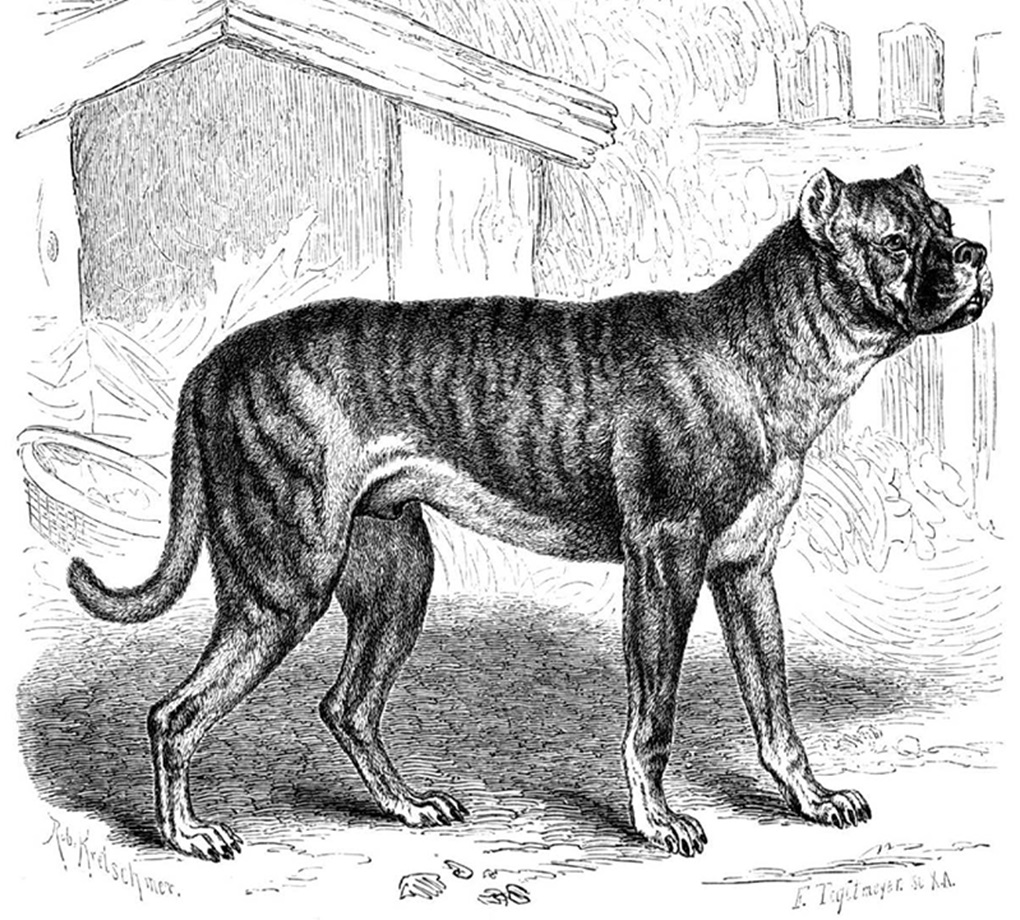
- Origin: Germany

The Bullenbeisser (German: Bullenbeißer), also known as the German Bulldog, is an extinct breed of dog known for its strength and agility. It is an ancestor of both the modern Boxer and the English bulldog. The Bullenbeisser was a mastiff-like dog and thought to have been bred as a hunting dog. In the Middle Ages types of the Bullenbeisser were found in many European countries where they were used as boar dogs. Later in the Bullenbeisser's history, they were thought to hold cattle at cattle markets or during slaughter by biting the animal's nose. In Germany, there were two types of Bullenbeisser: the larger Danziger and the small Brabant Bullenbeisser, which is often regarded as the precursor to the Boxer.

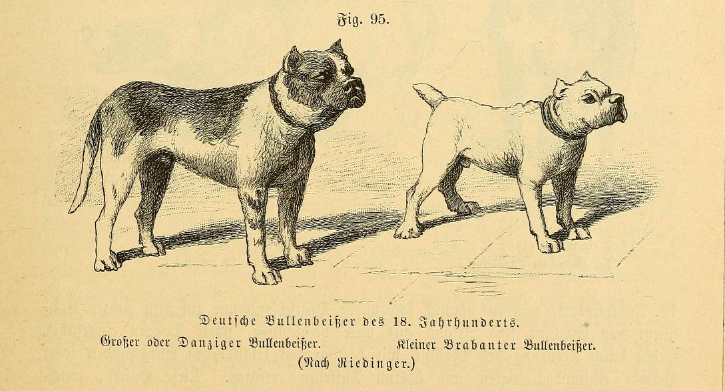
The two varieties of Bullenbeisser: the large Danziger variety and the small Brabanter variety.
