= Toy Bulldog =

Extinct breed of dog

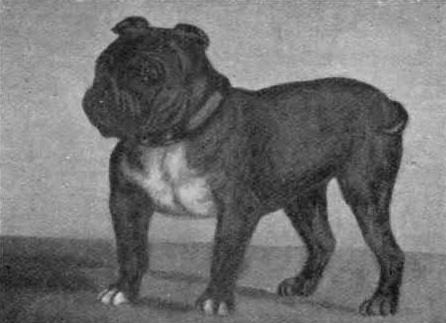
- 'Little Knot' (1903)
- Origin: United Kingdom
- Foundation stock: Old English Bulldog
- Breed status: Extinct. Not recognized as a breed by any major kennel club.
Traits
- Weight: 9 kg (20 lb)

The Toy Bulldog, also called the miniature bulldog, was a British type of miniature or toy bulldog in the nineteenth and early twentieth centuries. It was a miniature version of the Old English Bulldog, and derived from it either when natural small-sized sports were whelped from full-sized parents, or through systematic selective breeding for small size. A breed society, the Toy Bulldog Club, specified that the dogs should have the features and morphology of the full-sized bulldog, but with a weight not exceeding 9 kg (20 lb). The breed is now extinct, but the French bulldog and Boston terrier are descended from it.

== History ==
The breed emerged sometime after 1835, when bull-baiting was banned in Britain and the Old English bulldog subsequently fell out of favor. Old English bulldogs began to be selectively bred for smaller size, with these new dogs being dubbed "toy bulldogs". These new dogs were said to have "no useful purpose". The toy bulldogs were popular with women, especially lacemakers, who kept the small dogs in their laps as they worked. The dogs not only provided the workers with company, but also diverted fleas away from the humans by acting as an alternative host.

Beginning in the 1850s, the dogs were introduced to France, where they quickly became more popular than they were in Britain. Toy bulldogs were especially popular with prostitutes, who used the dogs to lure in customers. The French began to breed toy bulldogs to have "bat" ears, or ears that stood upright, as opposed to the curled (or "rose") ears that the breed originally had. This led to the so-called "war of the ears", in which the two sides disagreed over what the ears of the breed should look like. Though the bat-eared French version was not yet recognized by the Kennel Club, the Toy Bulldog Club began to recognize dogs that had bat ears and weighed over 13 kg (28 lbs). Those opposed to these changes split off into the rival English Toy Bulldog Club in 1902. The new breed became the French bulldog.

Though King Edward VII owned a toy bulldog named Paul, as well as a French bulldog named Peter, the breed was in decline by the early 1900s. The word "toy" had been added to the breed's name so as to differentiate it from the aggressive bull-baiting dogs it descended from. In 1906, however, the Kennel Club objected to the use of "toy" in the name, and renamed it the miniature bulldog. The last known record of one is from 1914, and the Kennel Club declared the breed extinct in 1920. The leading factors in its extinction were the popularity of French bulldogs, health issues that made breeding difficult, and the devastation of is home country in World War I.

== Description ==
=== Appearance ===
A French Bulldog puppy, displaying erect "bat" ears. The toy bulldog was distinct from the French bulldog in that its ears were curled, or "rose".

Described as resembling "a dwarfed specimen of the British bulldog", the toy bulldog was identical to the Old English bulldog in appearance, but at smaller proportions. The breed was to have a large skull and stocky body, with as short a tail as possible. Small and fine ears were desirable, and made them distinct from the French bulldog. Puppies had "button" ears (hanging forward) and developed their standard "rose" ears in late puppyhood. Having button ears as an adult was a fault.

The breed standard allowed a maximum weight of 9 kg (20 lbs), to differentiate the toy breed from the standard bulldog. This, however, was controversial among breeders, as such a weight was difficult to maintain. Some breeders would attempt to stunt growth in puppies by feeding them gin, despite this practice being discouraged.

=== Temperament ===
Author Leslie Williams described the breed as being "almost uncannily intelligent". They were playful and active, and had good appetites.

== Breeding ==
Toy bulldogs proved difficult to breed, with Williams describing them as "delicate beyond denying". Bitches frequently died while delivering their first litter, and those that did survive often made poor mothers. The dogs were also "shy breeders" that needed supervision when mating. Some breeders attempted to get toy bulldogs by mating two small standard bulldogs together, but this practice often led to the mother's death during delivery. Another method was to breed a medium sized bitch of the standard breed to a toy male, as bitches of such size were less likely to die during birth. Breeders were urged not to mix the toy bulldog with the French bulldog in order to keep the bloodline pure.

== Related breeds ==
The breed is an ancestor of the Boston terrier. The first Boston terriers were developed by mating a toy bulldog to a white English toy terrier, and then mating the offspring to a French bulldog.
