= Guard dog =

Working dog

A guard dog or watchdog is a dog used to watch for and guard people or property against unwanted human or animal intruders. A dog trained to attack intruders is known as an attack dog.

== History ==
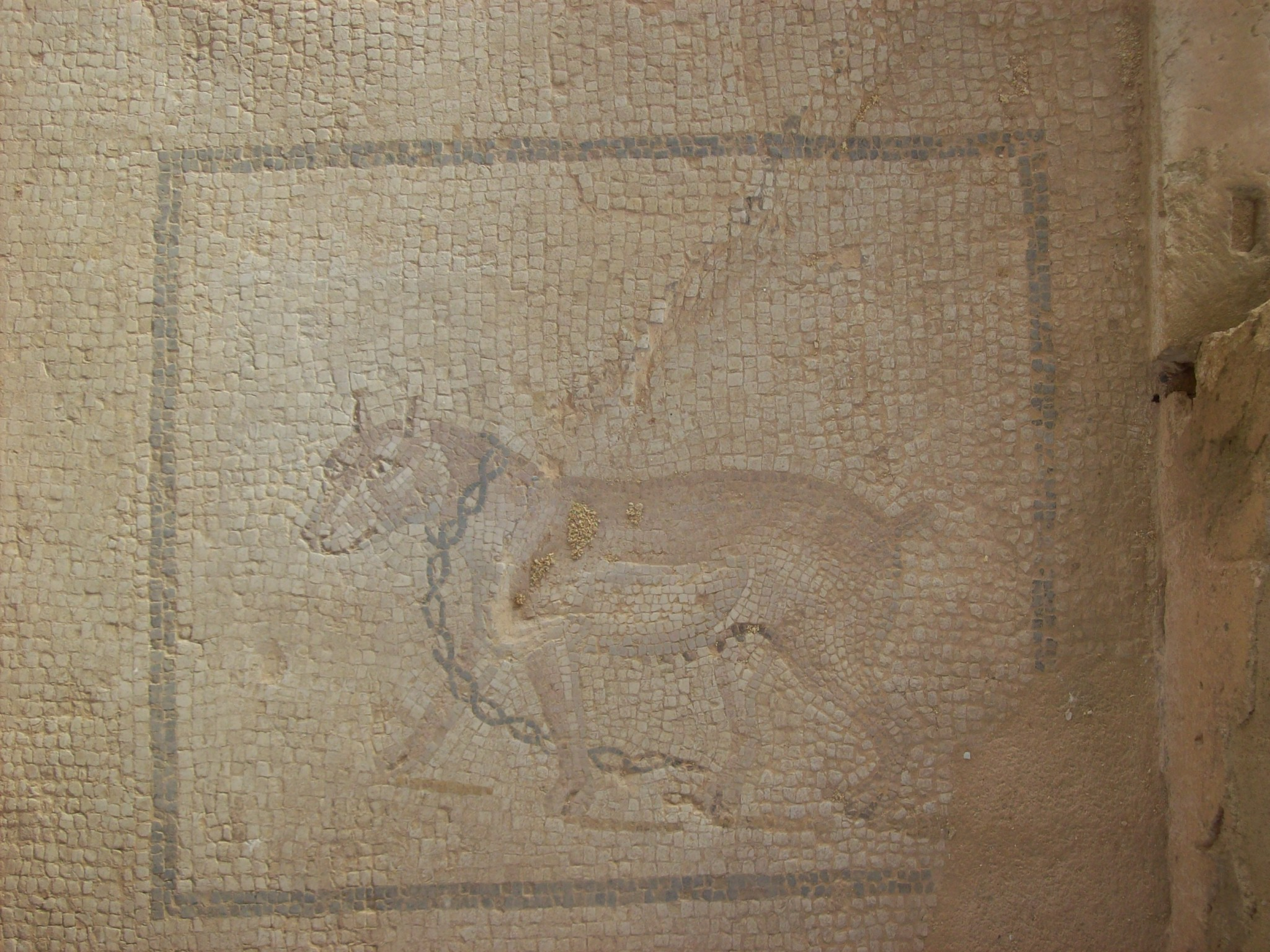
Roman mosaic of a large chained dog (with cropped ears and docked tail) at the Archaeological Park of Lilybaeum, Marsala, Sicily

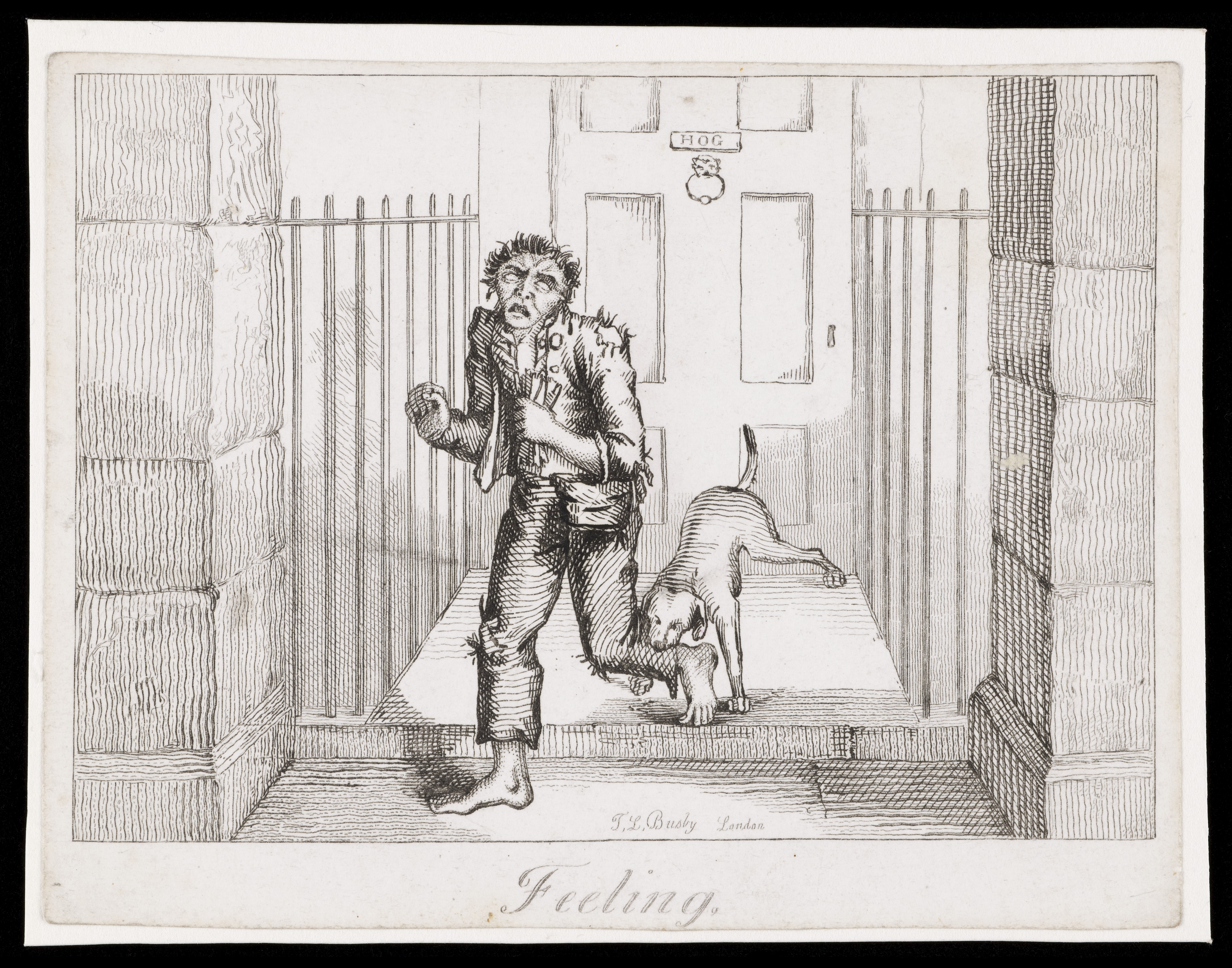
A raggedly dressed man being bitten by a house guard dog. Etching by Thomas Lord Busby, ca. 1826.

Dogs have been used as guardians since ancient times. The ancient Romans placed Cave canem mosaics at the entrance of homes to warn visitors and intruders of the presence of dangerous dogs at the property.

One of the first dog types used as guardians were Mastiff-type landraces of livestock guardian dogs, which protected livestock against large predators such as wolves, bears and leopards. In Greek mythology, Orthrus is an example of a livestock guardian dog known for guarding Geryon's red cattle. In more urban areas, some ancient guard dogs, such as the extinct bandogges, were chained during the day and released at night to protect properties, camps and villages.

== Barking ==
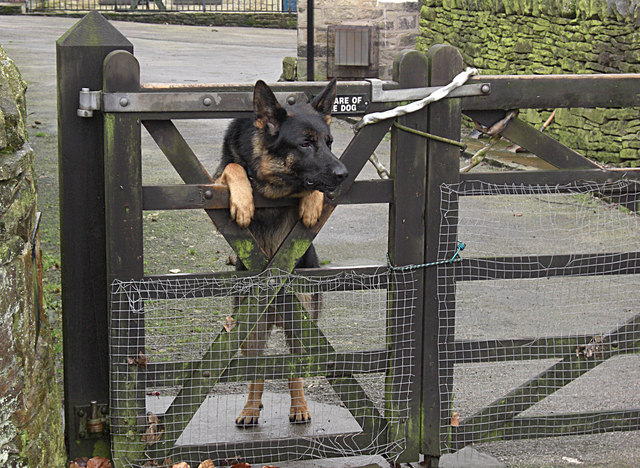
German Shepherd dog guarding property

Guard dogs bark loudly to alert their owners of an intruder's presence and scare away the intruder(s).

Livestock guardian dogs are often large enough—50–100 kilograms (110–220 lb)—and strong enough to attack and drive away livestock predators. Guard dogs bark to alert their master and warn of any approaching animal or human threats prior to their interception of the trespasser(s).

Specifically, livestock guardian dogs such as the Kangal use loud alarm barks as a first line of defense against presumed threats; if these do not deter a perceived foe, other displays, such as bluffing and charging, are employed. For livestock guardians, proactive forms of defense such as biting are only used if all other forms of deterrence fail.

If the risk is from human intruders, a suitable dog can be trained to be aggressive toward unrecognized humans and then tethered or enclosed in an area that the owner wishes to protect when he is not around (such as at night).

== Breeds ==
Many currently prominent guard dogs started as general purpose farm dogs, but gradually developed into guard breeds. However, dog breeds such as the Dobermann and the Dogue Brasileiro were specifically bred to guard. Guard dog breeds tend to be territorial, averse to strangers, dominant, and protective and loyal.

== Legality ==
The laws regarding ownership and usage of guard dogs vary from country to country. In England, the main legislation relating to the use of guard dogs on commercial premises are contained within the 1975 Guard Dogs Act. The act specifies the requirements of kennels and the need to display guard dog warning signs at the entrance to sites.

== See also ==
- Attack dog – Dogs trained to attack people
- Bandog – Type of dog
- Beware of the dog – Warning sign
- Dogs in warfare
- Faithful Ruslan – 1975 dissident novel by Georgi Vladimov
- Livestock guardian dog – Dog type bred to protect livestock
- Working dog – Dog trained to perform practical tasks
