= Campeiro Bulldog =

Dog breed developed in Southern Brazil

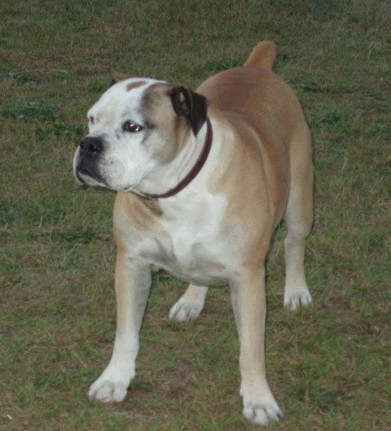
- Other names: Portuguese: Buldogue Campeiro
- Origin: Brazil
Traits
Height	Males	50–56 cm (20–22 in)
	Females	48–54 cm (19–21 in)
Weight	Males	36–42 kg (79–93 lb)
	Females	31–37 kg (68–82 lb)
- Coat: Short
- Colour: All colours except merle
Kennel club standards
- CBKC: standard
- Fédération Cynologique Internationale: standard

The Campeiro Bulldog (Portuguese: Buldogue campeiro, Portuguese pronunciation: [buwˈdɔɡ kãˈpejɾu]) is a breed of bulldog from Brazil.

== Overview ==
The Campeiro Bulldog was traditionally used in Brazil as a catch dog, catching and holding cattle, often in slaughterhouses. When the use of such dogs was banned in Brazilian slaughterhouses in the 1970s, the breed's numbers declined to the point of extinction. This was further exacerbated by the increased popularity of imported dog breeds. In the mid-1970s a private breeding program was commenced to save the breed and numbers have gradually recovered. The breed was recognised by the Confederação Brasileira de Cinofilia in 2001 and by the FCI in 2025.

According to the Confederação Brasileira de Cinofilia's breed standard, Campeiro Bulldogs typically stand between 48 and 56 centimetres (19 and 22 in), with dogs standing between 50 and 56 centimetres (20 and 22 in) and bitches between 48 and 54 centimetres (19 and 21 in). The breed standard states healthy adult dogs typically weigh between 36 and 42 kilograms (79 and 93 lb) and bitches between 31 and 37 kilograms (68 and 82 lb). The breed standard states the breed has a short, smooth coat that can be any colour except merle.

The breed is known to be aggressive to other dogs.

== See also ==
- List of dog breeds
