= Confederação Brasileira de Cinofilia =

Confederação Brasileira de Cinofilia (transl. Brazilian Confederation of Cynophilia) or CBKC is a Brazilian kennel club confederation based in Rio de Janeiro. The confederation is affiliated with the Fédération Cynologique Internationale (FCI), being the only representative of this system in Brazil.

== Operation ==
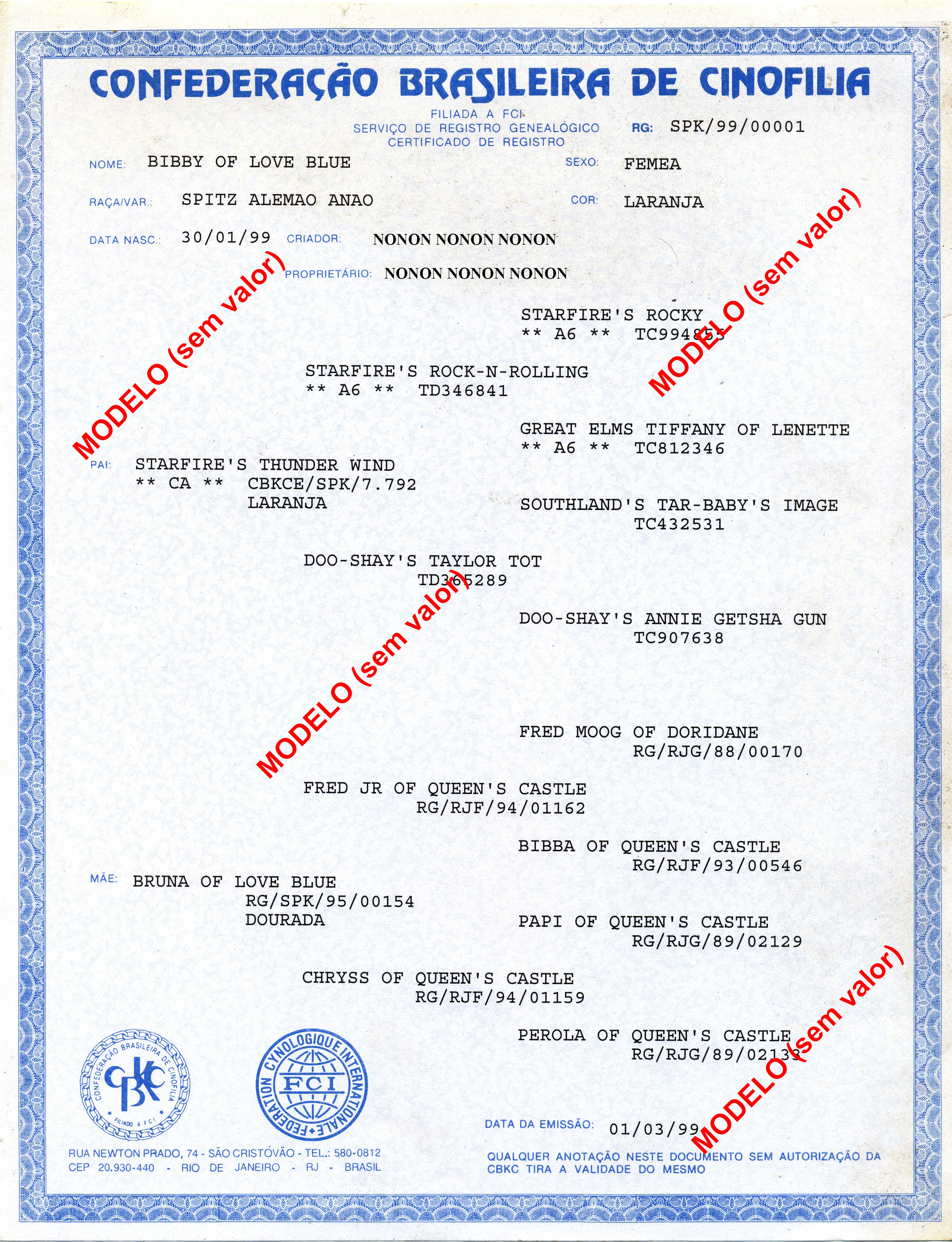
A pedigree issued by the Confederação Brasileira de Cinofilia.

The CBKC was created as successor to the agreements of the former Brazil Kennel Club and now congregates state federations and Kennel Clubs, which correspond to about ninety associations based in capitals and several municipalities in Brazil.

The confederation promotes events such as training shows for purebred dogs, work tests for trained dogs, agility, etc., and paid services such as kennel registration, pedigree (the blue one) issuing to dogs of pure breeds recognized by the system which the confederation represents (the FCI), and issuing of the so-called Certificate of Racial Purity (CPR - Certificado de Pureza Racial) which was called single register (RI - Registro Inicial) and is a registration document (the brown one) granted for dogs without any known pedigree which are approved by the visual evaluation of three judges in cases where the dog's anatomy is in accordance with what is described in the official standard of the breed.

== Group 11 ==
The confederation has a particularity: in spite of being the FCI representative in Brazil, which only divide the recognized breeds into ten groups, the CBKC innovated by creating a totally separate group: the "Group 11 - Breeds not recognized by the FCI", where it incorporates some national breeds that have not yet been accepted by any other kennel club, as well as some foreign breeds that are recognized by kennel clubs that are not part of the FCI system. For the Group 11 breeds the CBKC emits the red color registration certificate.

== See also ==
- Pedigree
- Purebred dog
- Breed registry
- Cynology
- The Kennel Club
- American Kennel Club
- Fédération Cynologique Internationale
