= List of dog diseases =

This list of dog diseases is a selection of diseases and other conditions found in the dog. Some of these diseases are unique to dogs or closely related species, while others are found in other animals, including humans. Not all of the articles listed here contain information specific to dogs. Articles with non-dog information are marked with an asterisk (*).

== Infectious diseases ==
=== Viral infections ===
- Rabies (hydrophobia) is a fatal viral disease that can affect any mammal, although the close relationship of dogs with humans makes canine rabies a zoonotic concern. Vaccination of dogs for rabies is commonly required by law. Please see the article dog health for information on this disease in dogs.
- Canine parvovirus is a sometimes fatal gastrointestinal infection that mainly affects puppies. It occurs worldwide.
- Canine coronavirus is a gastrointestinal disease that is usually asymptomatic or with mild clinical signs. The signs are worse in puppies.
- Canine distemper is an often fatal infectious disease that mainly has respiratory and neurological signs.
- Canine influenza is a newly emerging infectious respiratory disease. Up to 80 percent of dogs infected will have symptoms, but the mortality rate is only 5 to 8 percent.
- Infectious canine hepatitis is a sometimes fatal infectious disease of the liver.
- Canine herpesvirus is an infectious disease that is a common cause of death in puppies less than three weeks old.
- Pseudorabies (Morbus Aujeszky) is an infectious disease that primarily affects swine, but can also cause a fatal disease in dogs with signs similar to rabies.
- Canine minute virus is an infectious disease that can cause respiratory and gastrointestinal signs in young puppies.

=== Bacterial infections ===
- Brucellosis is a sexually transmitted bacterial disease that can cause uveitis, abortion, and orchitis in dogs.
- Leptospirosis is an infectious disease caused by a spirochaete. Symptoms include liver and kidney failure and vasculitis.
- Lyme disease* is a disease caused by Borrelia burgdorferi, a spirochaete, and spread by ticks of the genus Ixodes. Symptoms in dogs include acute arthritis, anorexia and lethargy. There is no rash as is typically seen in humans.
- Ehrlichiosis is a disease caused by Ehrlichia canis and spread by the brown dog tick, Rhipicephalus sanguineus. Signs include fever, vasculitis, and low blood counts.
- Rocky Mountain spotted fever* is a rickettsial disease that occurs in dogs and humans. It is caused by Rickettsia rickettsii and spread by ticks of the genus Dermacentor. Signs are similar to human disease, including anorexia, fever, and thrombocytopenia.
- Clostridium species can cause diarrhea in dogs. Associated species include C. perfringens and Clostridioides difficile.
- Kennel cough is an infectious respiratory disease that can be caused by one of several viruses or by Bordetella bronchiseptica. It most commonly occurs in dogs in close confinement such as in kennels.

=== Fungal infections ===
- Blastomycosis* is a fungal disease caused by Blastomyces dermatitidis that affects both dogs and humans. Dogs are ten times more likely to be infected than humans. The disease in dogs can affect the eyes, brain, lungs, skin, or bones.
- Histoplasmosis* is a fungal disease caused by Histoplasma capsulatum that affects both dogs and humans. The disease in dogs usually affects the lungs and small intestine.
- Coccidioidomycosis* is a fungal disease caused by Coccidioides immitis or Coccidioides posadasii that affects a variety of species, including dogs. In dogs signs of primary pulmonary disease include a cough, fever, weight loss, anorexia, and lethargy. Disseminated disease occurs when the fungus has spread outside of the lungs and may include clinical signs such as lameness, pain, seizures, anterior uveitis, and localized swelling. Diagnosis of Valley Fever may include multiple tests, including serology and radiology. According to a study performed in the Tucson and Phoenix area, 28% of dogs will test positive for exposure to the fungus by two years of age, but only 6% of the dogs will be ill with clinical disease. There is an increased risk of infection associated with amount of time spent outdoors, a larger roaming space accessed by the dog, and increasing age.
- Cryptococcosis* is a fungal disease caused by Cryptococcus neoformans that affects both dogs and humans. It is a rare disease in dogs, with cats seven to ten times more likely to be infected. The disease in dogs can affect the lungs and skin, but more commonly the eye and central nervous system.
- Ringworm is a fungal skin disease that in dogs is caused by Microsporum canis (70%), Microsporum gypseum (20%), and Trichophyton mentagrophytes (10%). Typical signs in dogs include hair loss and scaly skin.
- Sporotrichosis is a fungal disease caused by Sporothrix schenckii that affects both dogs and humans. It is a rare disease in dogs, with cat and horse infections predominating in veterinary medicine. The disease in dogs is usually nodular skin lesions of the head and trunk.
- Aspergillosis* is a fungal disease that in dogs is caused primarily by Aspergillus fumigatus. Infection is usually in the nasal cavity. Typical signs in dogs include sneezing, nasal discharge, bleeding from the nose, and ulcerations of the nose.
- Pythiosis is a disease caused by a water mould of the genus Pythium, P. insidiosum. It occurs primarily in dogs and horses, but can also affect humans. In dogs it affects the gastrointestinal system and lymph nodes, and rarely the skin.
- Mucormycosis is a collection of fungal and mold diseases in dogs including pythiosis, zygomycosis, and lagenidiosis that affect the gastrointestinal tract and skin.

=== Protozoal diseases ===
- Giardiasis* is an intestinal infection in dogs caused by the protozoa Giardia lamblia. The most common symptom is diarrhea. The zoonotic potential of giardiasis is controversial.
- Coccidiosis can be caused by a variety of coccidian organisms in dogs, most commonly Isospora. There are usually no symptoms, but diarrhea and weight loss may occur.
- Leishmaniasis* is spread by the sandfly, and in the dog as well as human has both cutaneous and visceral forms. The dog is considered to be the reservoir for human disease in the Americas.
- Babesiosis* is spread by members of the family Ixodidae, or hard ticks. The two species of the genus Babesia that affect dogs are B. canis and B. gibsoni. Babesiosis can cause hemolytic anemia in dogs.
- Neosporosis* is caused by Neospora caninum
- Protothecosis in dogs is caused by a mutant form of green algae and is usually disseminated. Symptoms include weight loss, uveitis, retinal detachment, and anal seepage.

=== Parasites ===
==== Internal parasites (endoparasites) ====
- Trichinosis caused by Trichinella spiralis, T. britovi.
- Echinococcosis is an infectious disease infecting dogs and sheep.
- Heartworm disease is caused by Dirofilaria immitis, which uses the mosquito as its vector. Heartworms live in the pulmonary artery and right ventricle of the heart. Heartworm disease in dogs is spread by mosquitoes that harbor the parasite Dirofilaria immitis. Signs include cough, difficulty breathing, and death.
- Gnathostomiasis is a disease from mammal feces and undercooked seafood.
- Intestinal parasites
  - Hookworms* are a common parasite of dogs. The most common is Ancylostoma caninum, followed by Uncinaria stenocephala and A. braziliense. Signs include diarrhea, vomiting, and weight loss.
  - Tapeworms* are also common and in the dog are usually Dipylidium caninum, which is spread by ingesting fleas and lice. Also common is Taenia pisiformis, spread by ingesting rabbits and rodents. Rare tapeworm infections are caused by species of the genera Echinococcus, Mesocestoides, and Spirometra. There are usually no symptoms.
  - Toxocariasis is an infection of Toxocara canis or Toxascaris leonina. Signs are usually mild, but may include diarrhea, pot-bellied appearance, poor growth, and vomiting.
  - Whipworms are parasites that live in the cecum and large intestine. The canine whipworm is Trichuris vulpis.

==== External parasites (ectoparasites) ====
- Fleas* cause itching and hair loss. The most common flea in dogs is the cat flea, Ctenocephalides felis, followed by the dog flea, C. canis.
- Ticks* are an external parasite of the dog and can spread diseases such as Lyme disease, Rocky Mountain spotted fever, babesiosis, and ehrlichiosis. They can also cause a neurological disorder known as tick paralysis.
- Mites
  - Ear mites are microscopic members of the species Otodectes cynotis. Symptoms include itching, inflammation, and black debris in the ear.
  - Cheyletiellosis is a mild pruritic skin disease caused by Cheyletiella yasguri. Humans can be transiently infected.
  - Chiggers*, also known as harvest mites, can cause itching, redness and crusting of the skin.
  - Demodicosis, also known as demodectic mange, is caused by Demodex canis mites which live in small numbers in sebaceous glands and hair follicles. These mites can cause inflammation and hair loss, and may also lead to secondary bacterial infections such as fever, lethargy, and enlarged lymph nodes.
  - Sarcoptic mange is caused by Sarcoptes scabiei canis. Signs include intense itching and scaling, and is contagious to humans.

== Diseases and disorders by system ==
=== Skeletal and muscular disorders ===
- Osteoarthritis*, also known as degenerative arthritis, is a common condition in dogs characterized by progressive deterioration of articular cartilage in the joints of the limbs. It can cause a great deal of pain and lameness. Treatment options include medications such as NSAIDs, corticosteroids, and joint fluid modifiers such as glycosaminoglycans. Other treatments include surgery, massage, warm compresses, chiropractic, and acupuncture.
- Hip dysplasia is an inherited disease in dogs that is characterized by abnormal development of the acetabulum and head of the femur. It is more common in large breeds.
- Elbow dysplasia is a condition found more commonly in large breeds. It incorporates several different hereditary conditions of the elbow, including osteochondritis of the medial condyle of the humerus, fragmentation of the medial coronoid process of the ulna, and ununited anconeal process of the ulna.
- Luxating patella is a medial or lateral displacement of the patella, or kneecap. It is strongly suspected to be inherited, but can also result from trauma. It is more common in smaller breeds of dogs.
- Osteochondritis dissecans (OCD) is separation of immature articular cartilage from underlying bone. It is caused by osteochondrosis, which is characterized by abnormal endochondral ossification of epiphyseal cartilage. It is most commonly seen in the stifle, elbow, shoulder, and hock.
- Panosteitis is a common disease of unknown cause that causes pain and a shifting leg lameness in medium and large breed dogs. It affects the long bones of the hind and forelimbs.
- Legg–Calvé–Perthes syndrome, also known as Perthes disease or avascular necrosis of the femoral head, is characterized by a deformity of the head of the femur and hip pain. It occurs in small-breed puppies.
- Back pain* in dogs, particularly in long-backed breeds, such as Basset Hounds and Dachshunds, is usually caused by intervertebral disk disease. It is caused by degeneration and protrusion of the disk and compression of the spinal cord. It occurs most commonly in the cervical and thoracolumbar regions. Signs include back pain, hind limb weakness, and paralysis.
- Congenital vertebral anomalies, including butterfly, block, and transitional vertebrae, and hemivertebrae, are a collection of malformations of the spine in animals. Most are not clinically significant, but they can cause compression of the spinal cord by deforming the vertebral canal or causing instability.
- Craniomandibular osteopathy is a hereditary disease in West Highland White Terriers and also occurs in other terrier breeds. It is a developmental disease in puppies causing extensive bony changes in the mandible and skull. Signs include pain upon opening the mouth.
- Hypertrophic osteopathy is a bone disease secondary to disease in the lungs. It is characterized by new bone formation on the outside of the long bones.
- Hypertrophic osteodystrophy is a bone disease in rapidly growing large breed dogs. Signs include swelling of the metaphysis (the part of the bone adjacent to the joint), pain, depression, loss of appetite, and fever. The disease is usually bilateral in the limb bones.
- Spondylosis*, known as spondylosis deformans in dogs, is growth of osteophytes on the ventral and lateral surfaces of the vertebral bodies. It is usually an incidental finding on radiographs and rarely causes symptoms.
- Masticatory muscle myositis (MMM) is an inflammatory disease in dogs affecting the muscles of the jaw. Signs include swelling of the jaw muscles and pain on opening the mouth. In chronic MMM there is atrophy of the jaw muscles, and scarring of the masticatory muscles due to fibrosis may result in inability to open the mouth (trismus).

=== Cardiovascular and circulatory ===
- Platelet disorders
  - von Willebrand disease* is a common inherited disease in dogs caused by a deficiency of a protein called von Willebrand factor, which is involved in blood clotting. The disease varies from mild to severe, depending on the amount of von Willebrand factor present in the dog. Signs include spontaneous bleeding and excessive bleeding following surgery, injury, or during an estrous cycle.
  - Thrombocytopenia* is a common condition in dogs characterized by low platelet counts. Platelets are used in clotting the blood, so dogs with this condition may have spontaneous bleeding or prolonged bleeding following surgery, injury, or during an estrous cycle. Causes include some rickettsial infections such as ehrlichiosis, cancers such as hemangiosarcoma, or immune-mediated disease.
  - Thrombocytosis* is a condition characterized by an excess of platelets. Most cases are physiologic (caused by exercise) or reactive (secondary to some cancers, blood loss, or certain drugs). Rarely the condition is caused by a primary bone marrow disorder. In this last case, the platelets may not function normally, causing the blood to not clot properly.
- Hemolytic anemia* is a type of regenerative anemia found in dogs characterized by destruction of the red blood cell. The most important type is immune-mediated hemolytic anemia, which can be a primary disease or secondary to cancer, infection, drugs, or vaccinations. Antibodies are present on the cell surface, leading to lysis and severe anemia. Other causes of hemolytic lesion include hypophosphatemia, exposure to toxins such as lead, infections such as ehrlichiosis or babesiosis, and rarely, neonatal isoerythrolysis. The behavioral condition pica, especially when involving the eating of concrete dust, tile grout, or sand, may be a sign of hemolytic anemia, indicating the need for a complete blood count to investigate a possible diagnosis.
- Heart diseases
  - Degenerative (myxomatous) mitral valve disease* is a common cause of congestive heart failure in dogs, especially small, older dogs. The leaflets of the valve become thickened and nodular, leading to mitral valve regurgitation and volume overload of the left side of the heart. Cavalier King Charles Spaniels and Dachshunds have an inherited form of this disease.
  - Dilated cardiomyopathy (DCM) is a disease of heart muscle resulting in decreased myocardial contractility. The left ventricle compensates for this disease by growing larger (eccentric or volume overload hypertrophy; AKA dilation). The left atrial is also dilated when the disease is severe. It is seen in large/giant dog breeds such as Boxers, Great Danes, and Doberman Pinschers. It is usually idiopathic, but can also be caused by taurine deficiency in American Cocker Spaniels or doxorubicin use. A mutation in the gene that encodes for pyruvate dehydrogenase kinase 4 is associated with DCM in Doberman Pinschers in the USA. Dilated cardiomyopathy usually ultimately results in congestive heart failure. Atrial fibrillation is common in giant breed dogs with DCM. Doberman Pinschers more commonly have ventricular arrhythmias (e.g., premature ventricular complexes; ventricular tachycardia) that predispose them to sudden death (i.e., ventricular fibrillation).
  - Congestive heart failure* is the result of any severe, overwhelming heart disease that most commonly results in pulmonary edema (fluid in the lungs), pleural effusion (fluid around the lungs), and/or ascites (fluid in the abdomen). It can be caused by the above two diseases, congenital heart defects such as patent ductus arteriosus, pulmonary hypertension, heartworm (Dirofilaria immitis) disease, or pericardial effusion. Signs depend on which side of the heart is affected. Left-sided heart failure results in rapid and/or difficulty breathing and sometimes coughing from a build-up of fluid in the lungs (pulmonary edema). Right-sided heart failure results in a large liver (congestion) and build-up of fluid in the abdomen (ascites), uncommonly fluid around the lungs (pleural effusion), or, rarely, peripheral edema.
  - Sick sinus syndrome* is most commonly seen in female Miniature Schnauzers. It is characterized by sinoatrial node dysfunction and may include atrioventricular node disease and bundle branch block. Electrocardiogram findings include sinus bradycardia, sinus arrest, sinoatrial heart block, and atrial tachycardia. The major clinical sign is fainting (syncope).
  - Heart defects
    - Subvalvular aortic stenosis (Subaortic stenosis; SAS) is a congenital disease in dogs characterized by left ventricular outflow tract obstruction by a discrete ring or tunnel of fibrous tissue immediately below the aortic valve. It is inherited in Newfoundlands, and also found in Golden Retrievers, Rottweilers, Boxers, Bulldogs, German Shepherds, and Samoyeds. Signs include a left basilar systolic heart murmur, weak femoral pulse, fainting and exercise intolerance. Dogs with severe SAS are predisposed to dying suddenly.
    - Pulmonic stenosis* is a congenital heart disease in dogs characterized by right ventricular outflow tract obstruction. Most commonly the narrowing occurs at the pulmonary valve but it can also occur below the valve (subvalvular) or above the valve (supravalvular). The most commonly affected breeds include terriers, Bulldogs, Miniature Schnauzers, Chihuahuas, Samoyeds, Beagles, Keeshonds, Mastiffs, and Bullmastiffs. Signs may include exercise intolerance, but often there is only a heart murmur.
    - Ventricular septal defect* is a hole in the division between the heart ventricles (interventricular septum). It is a congenital heart disease in dogs. There usually are no signs in dogs except for a heart murmur. However, a large defect can result in heart failure or in pulmonary hypertension leading to a right-to-left shunt.
    - Atrial septal defect* is a hole in the division between the heart atria (upper chambers of the heart). It is an uncommon abnormality in dogs. Most are not clinically significant, but large defects can cause right heart failure and exercise intolerance. Standard Poodles are the most common breed diagnosed with ASD in the USA.
    - Tetralogy of Fallot* is a congenital heart defect in dogs that includes four separate defects: pulmonic stenosis, a ventricular septal defect, right ventricular hypertrophy, and an overriding aorta. Keeshonds and Bulldogs are predisposed. Signs include cyanosis and exercise intolerance. Polycythemia is often present and, if severe, needs to be controlled with phlebotomy or drugs to suppress red blood cell production.
    - Patent ductus arteriosus* is one of the most common congenital heart defect in dogs around the world. It is inherited in toy and miniature Poodles, and seen commonly in German Shepherds, Pomeranians, Bichon Frises, and Malteses. Signs include a continuous heart murmur, bounding (strong) femoral pulse, tachypnea (increased breathing rate), dyspnea (labored breathing), and exercise intolerance.
    - Heart valve dysplasia (including mitral and tricuspid valve dysplasia) is a congenital heart abnormality in dogs. Dysplasia of the mitral and tricuspid valves - also known as the atrioventricular (AV) valves - can appear as thickened, shortened, or notched valves. Chordae tendineae are also usually abnormal.
    - Cor triatriatum*, specifically cor triatriatum dexter, occurs in dogs and is characterized by a fibrous division of the right atrium into two chambers, usually with a hole in between them. It results in right heart failure (ascites). It can be treated by balloon valvuloplasty or surgical resection.
- Pericardial effusion* is a collection of fluid in the pericardium. It is usually serosanguinous (bloody fluid). Serosanguinous accumulation can be caused by cancer, usually hemangiosarcoma or a heart base tumor, idiopathic pericarditis. Rare causes include trauma, clotting disorders, and left atrial rupture. Serous accumulation is rare and caused by heart failure, peritoneopericardial diaphragmatic hernias, uremia, pericardial cysts, or hypoalbuminemia. Rarely pericardial effusion can be caused by infection and consist of pus. An echocardiogram should be done prior to draining the fluid, if possible, to identify the cause (e.g., tumor). Drainage of the fluid (pericardiocentesis) relieves the clinical signs and, in the case of idiopathic pericarditis, can be curative.
- Pulmonary hypertension* is high pressure in the pulmonary artery. In dogs it can be caused by heartworm disease, pulmonary thromboembolism, or chronic hypoxemia (low oxygen). It can result in right-sided heart disease (cor pulmonale). Signs include difficulty breathing, cyanosis, and exercise intolerance.
- Trapped neutrophil syndrome* is an autosomal recessive disease which results in mature neutrophils being unable to migrate from the bone marrow into the blood. Affected pups have chronic infections and fail to thrive. Other symptoms can include stunted growth and a ferret like facial appearance. The disease is common in Border Collies.

=== Nervous system ===
- Syringomyelia* is a condition where a fluid filled sac develops in the spinal cord. The most important cause in dogs is by a Chiari I malformation, which is when an underdeveloped occipital bone interferes with spinal fluid circulation and results in fluid accumulation in the cervical spinal cord. This is a congenital disease most commonly found in small breeds such as the Brussels Griffon and the Cavalier King Charles Spaniel. Other breeds known to be affected include the Bichon Frise, Boston Terrier, Bull Terrier, Chihuahua, French Bulldog, Havanese, King Charles Spaniel (the English Toy Spaniel), Maltese, miniature Dachshund, miniature and toy Poodle, Papillon, Pomeranian, Pug, Shih Tzu, Staffordshire Bull Terrier, and the Yorkshire Terrier. Signs may include ataxia, weakness, and neck pain.
- Epilepsy in dogs can be a primary, idiopathic, inherited disorder or secondary to previous head trauma or CNS infections. Idiopathic epilepsy is commonly found in breeds such as German Shepherds, Beagles, and Dachshunds. The most common sign recurring generalized seizures beginning at a young adult age.
- Rage syndrome is a rare inherited seizure disorder characterized by explosive aggression and focal neurologic symptoms. It is associated with English Springer Spaniels, English Cocker Spaniels, and Belgian Malinois, and a genetic polymorphism has been linked to the condition in Malinois. Seizures occur in the temporal lobe. It is treatable with phenobarbital and supportive antiepileptics.
- Cerebellar hypoplasia is an incomplete development of the cerebellum. The most common cause in dogs is an in utero infection with canine herpesvirus. It is also seen associated with lissencephaly in Wire-haired Fox Terriers and Irish Setters, and as a separate condition in Chow Chows.
- Polyneuropathy is a collection of peripheral nerve disorders that often are breed-related in dogs. Polyneuropathy indicates that multiple nerves are involved, unlike mononeuropathy. Polyneuropathy usually involves motor nerve dysfunction, also known as lower motor neuron disease.
- Canine cognitive dysfunction is a progressive disease occurring in older dogs, which is similar to the dementia which occurs in humans with Alzheimer's disease.
- Scotty Cramp is a disease in Scottish Terriers causing spasms and hyperflexion and hyperextension of the legs. It is caused by a disorder in serotonin metabolism that causes a deficiency of available serotonin.
- Cauda equina syndrome*, also known as degenerative lumbosacral stenosis, in dogs is a compression of the cauda equina by a narrowing of the lumbosacral vertebral canal. It is most commonly seen in German Shepherd Dogs. Signs include pain, weakness, and rear limb muscle atrophy.
- Coonhound paralysis is a type of polyradiculoneuritis seen in Coonhounds. The cause has been related to a raccoon bite. Signs include rear leg weakness progressing rapidly to paralysis, and decreased reflexes.
- Tick paralysis* is a disease in dogs caused by a neurotoxin found in the saliva of female ticks. Dermacentor species predominate as a cause in North America, while Ixodes mainly causes the disease in Australia. There is a gradual onset of signs, which include incoordination progressing to paralysis, changed voice, and difficulty eating.
- Dancing Dobermann disease is a type of myopathy that primarily affects the gastrocnemius muscle in Dobermanns. It usually starts between the ages of 6 and 7 months. One rear leg will flex while standing. Over the next few months it will begin to affect the other rear leg.
- Granulomatous meningoencephalitis (GME) (including Pug Dog encephalitis and other noninfectious causes of meningoencephalitis) is an inflammatory disease of the central nervous system of dogs. It is a form of meningoencephalitis. The disease is more common in female toy dogs of young and middle age.
- Facial nerve paralysis* is most commonly caused in dogs by trauma, otitis media, or as an idiopathic condition. Signs include an inability to blink, drooping of the ear, and drooping of the lips on the affected side, although in chronic conditions fibrosis occurs and the ear and lips may appear to be in an abnormal position.
- Laryngeal paralysis is unilateral or bilateral paralysis of the larynx. In dogs it can be congenital, seen in the Bouvier des Flandres, Bull Terrier, Dalmatian, Rottweiler and Huskies, or an acquired, idiopathic disease, seen in older Labrador Retrievers, Golden Retrievers, St. Bernards, and Irish Setters. Signs include change in voice and difficulty breathing.
- White dog shaker syndrome causes full body tremors in small, white dog breeds. It is most common in West Highland White Terriers, Maltese, Bichons, and Poodles.
- Wobbler disease (cervical instability) is a condition of the cervical vertebrae that causes an unsteady gait and weakness in dogs.
- Cerebellar abiotrophy is caused by the death of Purkinje cells in the cerebellum. It results in progressive ataxia beginning at a young age. It is most commonly seen in Kerry Blue Terriers and Gordon Setters.

=== Eyes ===
- Eyelid diseases
  - Ectropion (eyelid folding outward) is a common condition in dogs, usually affecting the lower lid. Breeds associated with ectropion include the Cocker Spaniel, the St. Bernard, the Bloodhound, and the Basset Hound.
  - Entropion (eyelid folding inward) is a common condition in dogs, especially the Chow Chow, Shar Pei, St. Bernard, and Cocker Spaniel. Upper lid entropion involves the eyelashes rubbing on the eye, but the lower lid usually has no eyelashes, so hair rubs on the eye. Surgical correction is used in more severe cases.
  - Distichia (including ectopic cilia) is an eyelash that arises from an abnormal spot on the eyelid. Distichiae usually cause no symptoms because the lashes are soft, but they can irritate the eye and cause tearing, squinting, inflammation, and corneal ulcers.
  - Chalazion* is a granuloma that forms in the eyelid due to blocked secretions from the meibomian gland. Inflammation of the eyelid may result.
  - Trichiasis in dogs is hair from the eyelid growing in the wrong direction and rubbing on the eye, causing irritation. It usually occurs at the lateral upper eyelid, especially in the English Cocker Spaniel.
- Lens diseases
  - Cataracts* are an opacity in the lens of the eye. Most cataracts in dogs are caused by a genetic predisposition, but diabetes mellitus is also a common cause. The only effective treatment is surgical removal.
  - Lens luxation is a displacement of the lens from its normal position. Terrier breeds are predisposed.
  - Nuclear sclerosis is a consistent finding in dogs greater than seven years old. Nuclear sclerosis appears as a bilateral bluish-grey haziness at the nucleus, or center of the lens, and has little effect on vision. This is may be confused with cataracts.
- Retinal diseases
  - Progressive retinal atrophy (PRA) is a genetic disease of the retina that occurs bilaterally and is seen in certain breeds of dogs. It causes progressive vision loss culminating in blindness.
  - Retinal dysplasia is an eye disease affecting the retina. It is usually a nonprogressive disease and can be caused by viral infections, drugs, vitamin A deficiency, or genetics. Retinal dysplasia is characterized by folds or rosettes (round clumps) of the retinal tissue.
  - Sudden acquired retinal degeneration (SARD) is a disease in dogs causing sudden blindness. It can occur in any breed. The cause is unknown, but possibly involves either autoimmune disease, a toxin, or Cushing's disease. Symptoms include sudden permanent blindness, dilated pupils, and loss of the pupillary light reflex.
  - Retinal detachment* is caused in dogs by genetic disorders such as retinal dysplasia or Collie eye anomaly, trauma, inflammation or cancer. Reattachment may occur spontaneously or with medical or surgical therapy.
- Corneal diseases
  - Corneal dystrophy is a condition characterized by bilateral, noninflammatory opacity of the cornea. It appears as grayish white lines, circles, or clouding of the cornea. Corneal dystrophy can also have a crystalline appearance.
  - Corneal ulcer, or ulcerative keratitis, is an inflammatory condition of the cornea involving loss of its outer layer. They are caused by trauma, detergent burns, and infections. Other eye conditions can cause corneal ulcers, such as entropion, distichia, corneal dystrophy, and keratoconjunctivitis sicca.
  - Florida keratopathy an eye condition characterized by the presence of multiple spots within both corneas. In the United States, it is found most commonly in the southeastern part of the country.
  - Chronic superficial keratitis (pannus) is a form of superficial keratitis, or inflammation of the cornea, found most commonly in German Shepherds, Greyhounds, and Siberian Huskies.
- Collie eye anomaly (CEA) is a congenital, inherited, bilateral eye disease of dogs involving the retina, choroid, and sclera. It can be a mild disease or cause blindness. It is known to occur in Smooth and Rough Collies, Shetland Sheepdogs, Australian Shepherds, Border Collies, and Nova Scotia Duck Tolling Retrievers.
- Cherry eye is the term used to refer to canine nictitans gland prolapse, a common eye condition in various dog breeds where the gland of the third eyelid prolapses and becomes visible.
- Canine glaucoma is an increase of pressure within the eye. It is a common condition in dogs. It can be caused by abnormal development of the drainage angle of the eye, lens luxation, uveitis, or cancer. Cocker Spaniels, Poodles, and Basset Hounds are predisposed.
- Ocular melanosis (OM) is a disease of the eye which in dogs is almost found exclusively in the Cairn Terrier. The disease is caused by an increase of melanocytes in the iris, sclera, and surrounding structures.
- Keratoconjunctivitis sicca (dry eye) is common in dogs. Symptoms include eye redness, a yellow or greenish discharge, ulceration of the cornea, pigmented cornea, and blood vessels on the cornea.
- Vogt–Koyanagi–Harada syndrome is a condition seen in dogs characterized by uveitis (inflammation of the inside of the eye), poliosis (whitening of hair), and vitiligo (loss of pigment in the skin).
- Conjunctivitis* is inflammation of the conjunctiva. In dogs it is most commonly caused by mechanical irritation (such as by entropion, ectropion, or trichiasis), allergies, and keratoconjunctivitis sicca. Any bacterial infection is usually secondary.
- Eye proptosis is a condition resulting in forward displacement and entrapment of the eye from behind by the eyelids. It is a common result of head trauma in dogs. Most commonly it occurs in brachycephalic (short nosed) breeds.
- Horner's syndrome* results from damage to the sympathetic innervation of the eye. Signs include enophthalmos (sunken eye), miosis (small pupil), elevated third eyelid, and ptosis (drooping of the upper eyelid). Usually the syndrome in dogs is idiopathic, but it can also be caused by trauma, tumors, or ear infections.
- Optic neuritis* is inflammation of the optic nerves. In dogs this is most commonly caused by granulomatous meningoencephalitis or infection.
- Persistent pupillary membrane is a condition of the eye involving remnants of a fetal membrane that persist as strands of tissue crossing the pupil.
- Uveitis* is inflammation within the eye. Anterior uveitis (inflammation of the iris and ciliary body) is most common in dogs. The disease is usually immune-mediated in dogs, but may also be caused by trauma, cataracts, infectious canine hepatitis, leptospirosis, ehrlichiosis, or systemic fungal infections.
- Asteroid hyalosis is a degenerative condition of the eye involving small white opacities in the vitreous humor. The cause is unknown.
- Synchysis scintillans is a degenerative condition of the eye resulting in liquified vitreous humor and the accumulation of cholesterol crystals within the vitreous.
- Iris cysts are small hollow structures either attached to the iris of the eye or floating free in the anterior chamber.
- Imperforate lacrimal punctum is a congenital disorder of dogs involving the lack of an opening to the nasolacrimal duct (tear duct) in the conjunctiva.
- Exophthalmos is a normal condition in brachycephalic (short nosed) dog breeds because of the shallow orbit. However, it can lead to keratitis secondary to exposure of the cornea.

=== Ears ===
- Ear infections are common in dogs, particularly breeds with hanging ears, such as Beagles, and dogs with narrow ear canals, such as Cocker Spaniels. Other predisposing factors include allergies, ear parasites, and hypothyroidism.
- Deafness* in dogs can be either acquired or congenital. Predisposing factors for acquired deafness include chronic infection, use of certain drugs, and most commonly, age-related changes in the cochlea. Congenital deafness can be genetic, seen sometimes in dogs with merle or white coats, or caused by in utero damage from infections or toxins.
- Fly strike dermatitis occurs at the tip and folds of the ear in dogs. It is caused by bites of the stable fly, Stomoxys calcitrans.

=== Skin ===
- Allergies*
  - Atopy* is an allergy to a substance with which the dog is not necessarily in direct contact. It is a type I hypersensitivity to a substance that is inhaled or absorbed through the skin. Up to 10 percent of dogs are affected. It is common in dogs, especially seen in breeds such as Labrador Retrievers, Golden Retrievers, and Shih Tzus. The most common symptom is itching. Affected areas include the underside, the face, the feet, and the ears.
  - Flea allergy dermatitis is the most common skin disease of dogs in the United States. It is caused by sensitivity to flea saliva.
  - Food allergy* in dogs is commonly manifested as itching, especially of the face, paws, and the underside. Skin testing has proved unreliable, and a trial of a hypoallergenic diet is usually used for diagnosis.
- Follicular dysplasia is a genetic disease of dogs causing alopecia, or hair loss. It is caused by hair follicles that are misfunctioning due to structural abnormality.
- Dermoid sinus a genetic, autosomal skin condition in dogs. It can appear as single or multiple lumps on the dorsal midline.

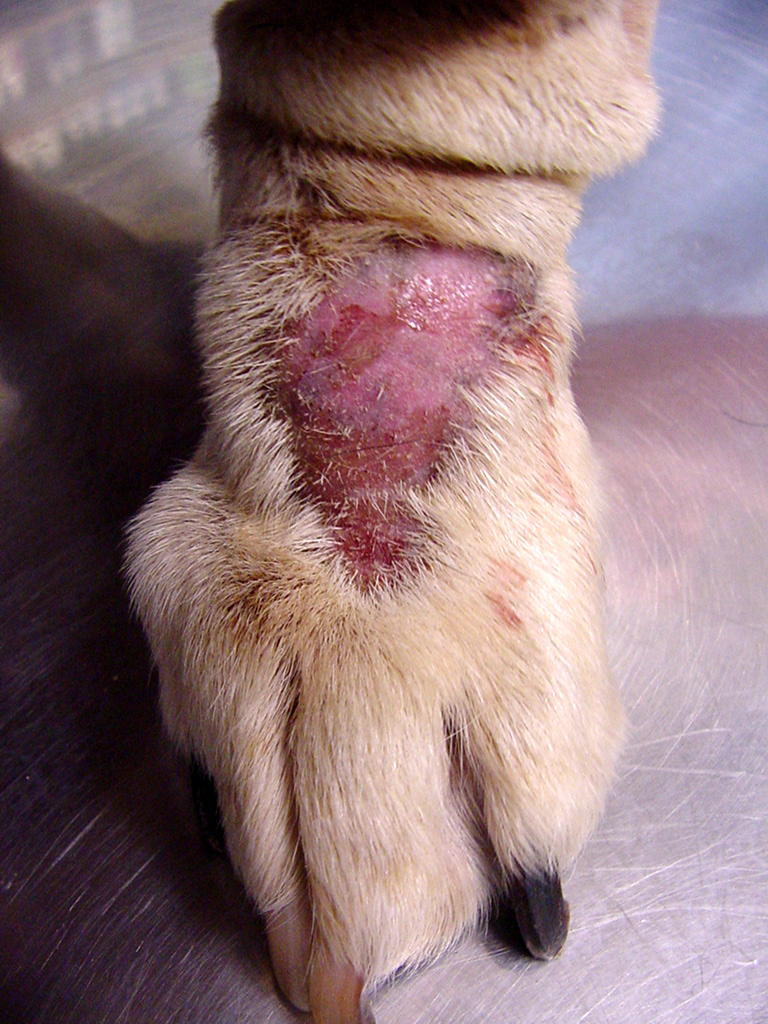
Lick granuloma from excessive licking

- Lick granuloma also known as acral lick dermatitis, is a skin disorder in dogs resulting from an urge to lick the lower portion of the leg. The lesion from the incessant licking is a thickened, firm, oval plaque.
- Pemphigus is an uncommon autoimmune skin disease. The most common form in dogs is pemphigus foliaceus, which manifests as erosions and crusting of the skin and mucocutaneous junctions. Pemphigus vulgaris is more rare and manifests as blister-like lesions in the mouth and at mucocutaneous junctions. Bullous pemphigoid is most commonly seen in Dobermanns and Collies and appears as a scald-like lesion of the groin.
- Sebaceous adenitis is an uncommon autoimmune skin disease. Most commonly found in Akitas and Standard Poodles.
- Dermal fragility syndrome, also known as Ehlers–Danlos-like syndrome, is a rare condition in dogs characterized by increased skin elasticity and poor wound healing. There appears to be a genetic basis for the disease.
- Discoid lupus erythematosus is an uncommon autoimmune disease of the skin in dogs. It does not progress to systemic lupus erythematosus in dogs. The most common initial symptom is scaling and loss of pigment on the nose.
- Juvenile cellulitis, also known as puppy strangles, is a disease that affects puppies. Its cause is unknown, but it is likely to have a hereditary component related to the immune system.

=== Endocrine diseases ===
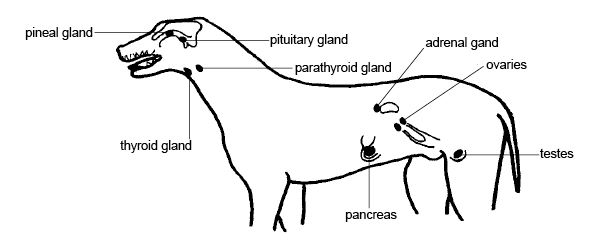
The endocrine organs of the dog.

- Diabetes mellitus in dogs is type 1, or insulin dependent diabetes: a lack of insulin production due to destruction of pancreatic beta cells. Current research indicates no evidence of type 2 diabetes in dogs. Among the causes of diabetes mellitus in dogs are autoimmune disease or severe pancreatitis. Common signs include weight loss, increased drinking and urination, and cataracts. Treatment involves insulin replacement therapy, and use of a diet high in fiber and complex carbohydrates.
- Thyroid diseases, including:
  - Hyperthyroidism is rare in dogs. The most common cause is thyroid carcinoma, a malignant tumor. Signs include weight loss, increased appetite, and enlargement of the thyroid gland.
  - Hypothyroidism is the most common endocrine disease in dogs. It can be caused by autoimmune destruction (lymphocytic thyroiditis) or idiopathic atrophy of the thyroid gland. These two causes are responsible for over 95% of the hypothyroidism cases in dogs. Signs include decreased appetite, weight gain, hair loss, dry skin/coat, skin that is cold to the touch, recurring skin infections, and lethargy. The dog may also seek out warm places to lie. The symptoms of hypothyroidism are shared with many other medical conditions; it may not be the first thought when a diagnosis is made. Symptoms may not appear until 75% or more of the gland is non-functional. In less than 10% of hypothyroidism cases, the problem is not with the thyroid gland itself, but with the pituitary gland in the brain. The pituitary gland produces a thyroid stimulating hormone (TSH); without this hormone to signal the thyroid gland to produce its thyroid hormone, the thyroid gland remains inactive. Treatment is with oral thyroid hormone supplementation. Lack of enough iodine in the diet can produce a form of hypothyroidism; without the proper amount of it, the thyroid gland fails to produce enough thyroid hormone. Myxedema coma is a rare but serious aspect of the disease that is a medical emergency.
- Hypoadrenocorticism, also known as Addison's disease, is a reduction of production of glucocorticoids and mineralocorticoids by the adrenal glands. It is most commonly caused by destruction of adrenal tissue, probably by autoimmune disease. Signs include increased drinking and urination, vomiting, diarrhea, collapse, shivering and weight loss; at times neither the causes nor symptoms are especially specific. It is possible not to see any symptoms of the disease until the adrenal cortex is 90% dysfunctional. Addison's can occur when regular steroid use is abruptly discontinued; steroid use should be reduced over time. About 35% of affected dogs are not diagnosed until they experience an Addisonian crisis, which outwardly appears to be a "classic" shock and is a medical emergency. Hyperkalemia can develop and cause severe bradycardia. Treatment is with supplementation of mineralocorticoids in daily pills or a monthly injection. The atypical form and the form caused by abrupt withdrawal of steroids do not need mineralocorticoids. Glucocorticoids are usually supplemented with oral prednisone.
- Cushing's syndrome, also known as hyperadrenocorticism, is characterized by an increase in glucocorticoids secreted by the adrenal glands. About 85 percent of cases are caused by a tumor in the pituitary gland, while 15 percent are caused by an adrenal tumor. The pituitary gland produces a hormone that signals the adrenal gland to produce cortisol; a tumor can cause it to produce the adrenal-stimulating hormone even when it is not needed. Signs include increased appetite, increased drinking and urination, a pot-bellied appearance, muscle weakness, and lethargy. Cushing's can be caused by overuse of steroid medications; in some cases, stopping the medication is enough to solve the problem. Diagnosis can be difficult as there are no tests with both high sensitivity and specificity. Treatments include mitotane, trilostane, ketoconazole, or selegiline. Surgery is used in some cases of adrenal tumors.
- Diabetes insipidus* in dogs can be central, caused by a lack of antidiuretic hormone (ADH), or nephrogenic, caused by a lack of response of the kidneys to ADH. Neither form is common. Central diabetes insipidus (CDI) is usually idiopathic, but can also be caused by head trauma or tumors of the brain. Nephrogenic diabetes insipidus (NDI) can be primary (hereditary) or secondary (caused by a variety of metabolic and renal diseases, including Cushing's syndrome and pyometra). Because the disease is characterized by an inability to concentrate urine, the most common sign is increased drinking and urinating. Treatment of CDI is to use desmopressin, a synthetic analog of ADH. Treatment of NDI is to treat the underlying cause, if any.
- Acromegaly (also known as hypersomatotropism) is a hormonal condition resulting from over-secretion of the growth hormone somatotropin from the pituitary gland. The hormone is responsible for growth from birth to adulthood. Normally in adulthood, the growth plates of the bones close and the secretion of the hormone slows considerably. Because the bone plates close when entering maturity, the continued growth of acromegaly is not of normal proportions. Most dogs with the disease are unspayed females, but the condition can come about with use of medications containing progesterone. Acromegaly patients often also have diabetes mellitus. There is a transient form of acromegaly which can affect females at the diestrus portion of the reproductive cycle. This condition is brought about by the mammary glands excreting excess growth hormone, which is triggered by progesterone from the ovaries. As with non-transient acromegaly, spaying is necessary. The symptoms can include overgrowth or enlargement of gums with wide spaces between teeth, increased drinking, increased urination, thickening of the skin and skin folds, enlargement of the tongue and excessive panting. Acromegaly is also possible from a somatotroph adenoma. The hormone somatostatin can also be useful in treatment. Since hypothyroidism is connected with the release of excess growth hormone, hypothyroidism can be mistaken for acromegaly.
- Juvenile-onset panhypopituitarism, also called pituitary dwarfism, is a growth hormone deficiency that occurs most frequently in German Shepherd Dogs. It is caused by a mutation in the LHX3 gene and is inherited as an autosomal recessive trait. Affected puppies grow slowly and keep a soft puppy coat, and a genetic test is available.

=== Gastrointestinal diseases ===
- Megaesophagus is a disease of the esophagus characterized by low motility and dilation. Most cases in adult dogs are idiopathic. It is the most common cause of regurgitation in dogs. Other causes of megaesophagus include myasthenia gravis, lead poisoning, and Addison's disease.
- Gastric dilatation volvulus, commonly known as bloat, is a serious condition in which the stomach swells with air (gastric dilatation), sometimes twisting on itself (volvulus). Deep-chested breeds are at a higher risk of bloating. Factors that predispose dogs to this condition are intestinal foreign bodies, intestinal cancer, intussusception, and other intestinal diseases. It has a poor prognosis.
- Foreign body is an object foreign to the body that becomes lodged in the gastrointestinal tract (or other part of the dog). Dogs are susceptible to gastrointestinal obstruction due to their ability to swallow relatively large objects and pass them through the esophagus. Foreign bodies most commonly become lodged in the stomach because of the inability to pass through the pyloric sphincter, and in the jejunum.
- Anal fistulae*, known as perianal fistulae in dogs, are most common in German Shepherd Dogs. They are characterized by draining tracts in the skin around the anus. The disease is thought to be immune-mediated. Medical treatment is the mainstay: cyclosporine is the drug of choice, ketoconazole can be added to allow a lower cyclosporine dose, and topical tacrolimus may be used for mild lesions.
- Exocrine pancreatic insufficiency is the inability to properly digest food due to a lack of digestive enzymes made by the pancreas. This disease is found frequently in dogs.
- Pancreatitis*, or inflammation of the pancreas, is common in dogs. It is most commonly seen in middle-aged and older overweight dogs. Miniature Schnauzers are predisposed. Contributing factors include diabetes, hyperlipidemia, obesity, and dietary indiscretion. Signs include vomiting, diarrhea, abdominal pain, lethargy, and anorexia.
- Inflammatory bowel disease (IBD)* is a group of diseases in dogs that are idiopathic and characterized by the presence of inflammatory cell infiltrates in the stomach and/or intestinal walls. It is a common condition. Signs include vomiting, diarrhea, and weight loss. Treatment is with dietary modification and use of medications such as corticosteroids, metronidazole, sulfasalazine, and azathioprine.
- Antibiotic-responsive enteropathy is a form of chronic intestinal disease in dogs in which long-term signs such as vomiting, diarrhea, changes in appetite, and weight loss respond to treatment with antibiotics. Affected dogs are usually younger large-breed dogs, and German Shepherds are overrepresented.
- Bilious vomiting syndrome is vomiting in response to bile-induced inflammation of the stomach. Bile salts interfere with the gastric mucosal barrier, allowing acid to irritate the stomach lining and cause gastritis.
- Intussusception* is characterized by telescoping of one part of the gastrointestinal tract into another part, forming an obstruction. It is most common in dogs six to eight months old. Surgery is necessary for treatment.
- Lymphangiectasia is an intestinal disease of dogs characterized by chronic diarrhea and loss of proteins such as serum albumin and globulin. It is considered to be a chronic form of protein-losing enteropathy. Breeds commonly affected include the Soft-Coated Wheaten Terrier, Norwegian Lundehund, Basenji, and Yorkshire Terrier.
- Hemorrhagic gastroenteritis is a disease of dogs characterized by sudden vomiting and bloody diarrhea. The symptoms are usually severe and can be fatal if not treated. It is most common in young adult dogs of any breed, but especially small dogs such as the Toy Poodle and Miniature Schnauzer.
- Gallbladder mucocele is a disease whereby the gallbladder becomes extended with bile and mucus, which can lead to the blockage of bile outflow from the liver.

=== Urinary and reproductive systems ===
- Kidney diseases
  - Fanconi syndrome is a type of renal tubule disease found in Basenjis. Findings include the inability to concentrate urine, and the presence of glucose, protein, and amino acids in the urine.
  - Kidney failure* is common in dogs and may be found in acute or chronic forms. It is defined by a loss of function of about 75 percent of the filtration system of the kidney and characterized by azotemia and low specific gravity of the urine. Acute kidney injury can be caused by loss of blood supply, hypercalcemia, or toxins such as ethylene glycol (antifreeze) or aminoglycoside antibiotics (see: ethylene glycol poisoning). Chronic kidney failure can be congenital and/or inherited or caused by cancer, infection, hypertension, glomerulonephritis, amyloidosis, progressive interstitial fibrosis, or any of the causes of acute kidney injury.
  - Glomerulonephritis* is the presence of immune complexes in the glomerulus, resulting in leakage of protein into the urine. It can be caused by cancer, heartworm disease, pyometra, rickettsial infection, or systemic lupus erythematosus. It can result in chronic kidney failure, hypoalbuminemia, which can cause ascites and peripheral edema, and nephrotic syndrome, which can cause hypertension or hypercoagulability.
  - Familial renal disease is an uncommon cause of kidney failure in young dogs. Most causes are breed-related (familial) and some are inherited.
  - Renal cystadenocarcinoma and nodular dermatofibrosis is a rare inherited cancer syndrome that occurs almost exclusively in German Shepherds, likely inherited as an autosomal dominant trait caused by a mutation in the BHD (FLCN) gene. Affected dogs develop multiple slowly growing, firm skin nodules, mainly on the limbs, together with tumors in both kidneys; the skin nodules usually appear months to years before illness from kidney failure or spread of the cancer.
  - Samoyed hereditary glomerulopathy (SHG) is an hereditary noninflammatory disease, of the renal glomeruli occurring in the Samoyed breed of dog. The disease has been shown to be a model for hereditary nephritis (HN) in humans
- Urinary bladder diseases
  - Bladder stones or uroliths are common in dogs. The stones form in the urinary bladder in varying size and numbers secondary to infection, dietary influences, and genetics. Types of stones include struvite, calcium oxalate, urate, cystine, calcium phosphate, and silicate. Struvite and calcium oxalate stones are by far the most common.
  - Urinary tract infection*, specifically cystitis or bladder infection, is common in dogs and usually caused by bacteria. Signs include blood in the urine (hematuria), difficulty urinating (dysuria), and frequent urination (polyuria). The most common types of bacteria cultured from the urine of dogs with cystitis are E. coli, Staphylococcus spp., Proteus mirabilis, Streptococcus spp., Klebsiella pneumoniae, Pseudomonas aeruginosa, and Enterobacter spp.
  - Urinary incontinence* is leakage of urine, usually due to incompetence of the urethral sphincter in adult dogs and ectopic ureter (a congenital condition in which the ureter enters the urinary tract posterior to the urethral sphincter) in puppies. In adult dogs it is most commonly seen in large spayed females. The lack of estrogens in spayed dogs has been linked to development of incontinence. Replacement of estrogens, phenylpropanolamine, and surgery have all been used for treatment.
- Reproductive diseases
  - Prostate disease* in dogs includes benign prostatic hyperplasia (BPH), prostatitis (infection of the prostate), cancer, and cysts and abscesses. BPH is the most common and is found in older intact (not neutered) dogs. Signs include blood in the urine and straining to urinate and defecate. Castration is the treatment of choice. Prostatis can be associated with BPH. Bacteria causing prostatitis include E. coli, Staphylococcus spp., Streptococcus spp., and Mycoplasma spp.
  - Cryptorchidism is when one the testicles is retained in the abdomen or inguinal canal past a normal stage of development. It is a common occurrence in dogs and is thought to be a sex-limited autosomal recessive trait.
  - False pregnancy*, or pseudocyesis, is a common condition in female intact dogs. Signs include swelling of the mammary glands, lactation, not eating, and "mothering" small objects.
  - Pyometra is an infection of the uterus. It is a common and potentially fatal condition in dogs. The main risk period for a female is for eight weeks after her peak standing heat (or estrus cycle) has ended.
- Umbilical hernia* is a failure of the umbilical ring of the abdominal wall to close. They are very common and can be caused by genetics or by traction on the umbilical cord or by the cord being cut too close to the body. They are corrected by surgery.
- Inguinal hernia* is a protrusion of abdominal contents through the inguinal canal. They are corrected through surgery.

== Cancers ==
- Canine transmissible venereal tumor is a tumor of the external genitalia (penis, vulva). It is spread by sexual contact and is more common in hot and humid climates.
- Hemangiosarcoma is an aggressive tumor that most often affects the heart, the spleen, the skin and subcutaneous tissues, and the liver.
- Osteosarcoma* is an aggressive bone tumor that commonly spreads to the lungs. It is more common in large and giant breed dogs.
- Histiocytoma is a benign skin tumor that is more frequent in young dogs (<4 years), and often regresses without treatment.
- Malignant histiocytosis (histiocytic sarcoma) is an aggressive cancer found primarily in certain breeds including the Bernese Mountain Dog, rottweiler, golden retriever and flat coated retriever. It is characterized by infiltration of the joints, lungs, spleen, lymph nodes, and other organs by malignant histiocytes.
- A mast cell tumor (mastocytoma) is a type of tumor normally found in the skin of dogs. It can also invade the subcutis and spread to the liver, spleen, or bone marrow.
- Lymphoma (lymphosarcoma) is a malignant cancer that is classified by location, cell type, and histological grade. The most common form in dogs is multicentric, involving the lymph nodes.
- Fibrosarcoma* is a malignant tumor that most commonly occurs in the mouth in dogs, and less commonly in the skin, subcutis, and bones.
- Aggressive fibromatosis,* also known as desmoid fibromatosis, a type of non-metastasizing soft-tissue sarcoma, may occur in dogs.
- Squamous cell carcinoma* is a malignant tumor in dogs that most commonly occurs in the oral cavity, including the tongue, tonsils, and gingiva. Squamous cell carcinoma accounts for 5 percent of skin tumors in dogs, and are the most common tumor of the toe. Dogs with unpigmented skin on the nose may develop this cancer from long-term sun exposure.
- Perianal gland tumor (also called hepatoid tumor) is a type of tumor found near the anus in dogs that arises from specialized glandular tissue found in the perineum. They are most common in intact (not neutered) male dogs.
- Anal sac adenocarcinoma is an uncommon and aggressive malignant tumor found in dogs that arises from the tissue of anal sac.
- Melanomas* account for four to six percent of skin tumors in dogs and are usually benign. They are the second most common tumor of the toe and are malignant in this location. Melanoma is also a common oral tumor in dogs. Malignant tumors most commonly spread to the lymph nodes and lungs.
- Leukemias* are progressive proliferation of cancerous white blood cells within the bone marrow, resulting in destruction of the bone marrow and pancytopenia in many cases. Types of leukemia in dogs include acute lymphoblastic leukemia, acute myelocytic leukemia, acute monocytic leukemia, acute myelomonocytic leukemia, acute megakaryocytic leukemia, chronic lymphocytic leukemia, chronic myelogenous leukemia, chronic basophilic leukemia, and chronic eosinophilic leukemia (or hypereosinophilic syndrome).
- Plasmacytomas* are common skin tumors in dogs that derive from B lymphocytes. Most are benign. Tumors of B lymphocyte origin that affect the bone marrow and are diffuse throughout the body are malignant and are called multiple myeloma*.
- Prostate cancer* is rare in dogs and occurs in both intact and neutered animals. It is malignant. The most common type is adenocarcinoma. Signs include blood in the urine and straining to urinate or defecate. It most commonly spreads to bone and the lungs.
- Mammary tumors in dogs are potentially benign or malignant. They occur most commonly in non-spayed females or female that were spayed later in life.
- Insulinomas* in dogs are insulin secreting tumors of the pancreas. The most common sign is hypoglycemia. They commonly metastasize to the liver.
- Oral cancer* includes tumors of the tongue, tonsils, gingiva, and palate. The most common types are squamous cell carcinomas, melanomas, and fibrosarcomas.
- Ocular tumors* in dogs are found in the eyelid, conjunctiva, third eyelid, cornea, sclera, iris, ciliary body, retina, choroid, optic nerve, and orbit. The most common types are Meibomian gland adenoma (eyelid), papilloma (eyelid), melanoma (eyelid, conjunctiva, sclera, iris, ciliary body, choroid), squamous cell carcinoma (conjunctiva), adenoma (ciliary body), adenocarcinoma (ciliary body), lymphoma (retina, choroid, ciliary body), medulloepithelioma (retina, choroid), ganglioglioma (retina, choroid), osteosarcoma (orbit), mast cell tumor (orbit), and optic nerve sheath meningioma.
- Nasal cancer makes up one to two percent of all types of tumors in dogs. Adenocarcinoma is the most common type, followed by sarcomas such as fiborsarcoma and chondrosarcoma. Signs include sneezing and bloody nasal discharge.
- Thyroid cancer* is rare and usually nonproductive in dogs (unlike in cats, in which it causes hyperthyroidism). One-third of thyroid tumors are small benign adenomas; the rest are malignant carcinomas, usually large and invasive.
- Gastrointestinal cancer* is uncommon in dogs: stomach tumors represent less than 1% and intestinal tumors less than 10% of all cancers in small animals, and the average age of affected dogs is 6–9 years. Adenocarcinoma and lymphoma are seen most frequently; the most common type overall is lymphoma. Belgian Shepherds have an increased risk for stomach cancer, while colorectal tumors are more prevalent in Boxers, German Shepherds, Poodles, Great Danes, and spaniels. Nonlymphomatous esophageal cancer is especially rare, the most common types being squamous cell carcinoma, adenocarcinoma, leiomyosarcoma, and osteogenic sarcoma associated with the parasite Spirocerca lupi. Nonlymphomatous stomach cancer is usually an adenocarcinoma, and nonlymphomatous intestinal cancer is usually polyps, adenomas, adenocarcinomas, leiomyosarcomas, and leiomyomas.
- Kidney cancer* is uncommon in dogs. The most common type is renal cell carcinoma.
- Lung cancer* is usually the result of metastasis in dogs. Primary tumors are rare. The most common type is adenocarcinoma.
- Heart tumors* are rare in dogs. Types include hemangiosarcoma, fibrosarcoma, and fibroma.
- Testicular tumors* are the most common tumor of the canine male reproductive tract. Tumor types include Sertoli cell tumor, seminoma, and interstitial cell tumor. None commonly metastasize.
- Ovarian cancer* is uncommon in dogs, with the most common type being the granulosa cell tumor. This type of tumor can metastasize and can cause cystic endometrial hyperplasia.
- Uterine cancer* is very rare in dogs. The most common type is benign leiomyoma.
- Bladder cancer* is usually malignant in dogs. The most common type is transitional cell carcinoma.
- Liver cancer* is usually metastatic in dogs. Primary tumors are and include benign hepatocellular adenoma (hepatoma) and malignant hepatic carcinoids.
- Brain tumors* can be either metastatic or primary in dogs. The incidence of primary tumors is 14.5 per 100,000 dogs at risk. Types include meningioma, astrocytoma, oligodendroglioma, and undifferentiated sarcoma.

== Behavioral ==
- Pica* is an appetite for, or the behavior of eating, non-nutritive substances (e.g., sand, coal, soil, chalk, paper). Pica can be dangerous to dogs. For example, dogs that eat dirt near roads that existed prior to the phaseout of tetraethyllead in gasoline or prior to the cessation of the use of contaminated oil (containing toxic PCBs) can die. In addition to poisoning, there is a risk of gastro-intestinal obstruction or tearing in the stomach or blockage of the esophagus. Pica in dogs may be a sign of immune-mediated hemolytic anemia, especially when it involves eating substances such as tile grout, concrete dust, and sand. Dogs exhibiting this form of pica should be tested for anemia with a complete blood count including hematocrit levels, or packed cell volume.
- Coprophagia* is the ingestion by a dog of feces, either its own or those of another dog or animal. It can be caused by medical conditions such as exocrine pancreatic insufficiency, overfeeding, or malabsorption. It can also be a behavioral problem characterized by attention-seeking, reinforcement, or as a learned behavior. Numerous health problems can arise from this activity, including internal parasites or infection with canine parvovirus or toxoplasmosis. Treatment includes behavioral modification therapy or altering the feces to affect its taste.

== Environmental ==
- Sensitivity to anaesthesia can occur in any breed, but sighthounds have been the breeds most documented to have anesthetic concerns. Sighthounds are known to have prolonged recovery times from ultra short-acting thiobarbiturates such as thiopental.
- Heat stroke can occur in dogs, especially in flat-faced breeds such as the Bulldog or in giant breeds. Breed, lack of water, exercise, and high ambient temperature predispose dogs to heat stroke. Signs include vomiting, diarrhea, collapse, difficulty breathing, and body temperature approaching 42 °C to 43 °C. Treatment includes cooling the dogs with wet towels and fans, intravenous fluid therapy, and other supportive care. If a dog's temperature begins to drop to around 40 °C, stop the cooling process. Allow the dog only a couple of laps of water until the temperature begins to drop to a more normal level. Do not allow a dog to gulp large quantities of water. If a dog is panting excessively and then drinks a lot of water, large amounts of air may be swallowed along with the water and this can cause an equally life-threatening case of gastric dilatation volvulus (bloat) in the stomach.
- Foxtails and sandburs can penetrate the lining of the mouth or skin and migrate, causing abscesses and draining tracts.

== Poisons and overdoses ==
- Acetaminophen (paracetamol, Tylenol) can cause liver damage in dogs. The toxic dose is 150 mg/kg.
- Ibuprofen (Advil)* can cause gastrointestinal irritation, stomach ulcers, and kidney damage in dogs.
- Naproxen (Aleve)* has a long half-life in dogs and can cause gastrointestinal irritation, anemia, melena (digested blood in feces), and vomiting.
- Antifreeze* is very dangerous to dogs and causes central nervous system depression and acute kidney injury. Treatment needs to be within eight hours of ingestion to be successful. See Ethylene glycol poisoning.
- Mouse and rat poison* ingestion is common in dogs. Most rodenticides in the United States are anticoagulant by depleting vitamin K. This type is the most frequent cause of poisoning in pets. Third generation products contain brodifacoum or bromadiolone and are toxic after a single ingestion. Signs include spontaneous and excessive bleeding internally and externally. Treatment is with vitamin K supplementation. Other rodenticides may contain cholecalciferol which causes hypercalcemia and leads to heart and kidney problems. Newer rodenticides may contain bromethalin which causes central nervous system signs such as seizures, muscle tremors, and depression.
- Insecticides* used in dogs for fleas and ticks commonly contain either organophosphates or carbamates. They can be absorbed through the skin, conjunctiva, gastrointestinal tract, and lungs. Organophosphates inhibit acetylcholinesterase irreversibly and carbamates inhibit cholinesterase reversibly. Toxicity occurs through overdosage with an appropriate product or use of an agricultural product. Signs for both include hypersalivation, vomiting, lethargy, tremors, difficulty walking, weakness, and death.
- Chocolate is a common cause of poisoning in dogs. The toxic principles in chocolate are theobromine and caffeine. Baker's chocolate is the most dangerous form since it contains higher concentrations of these drugs, followed by semi-sweet, dark, and then milk chocolate. Signs include vomiting, diarrhea, tremors, difficulty walking, seizures, and heart problems.
- Lead poisoning* is uncommon in dogs. Exposure to lead is from eating paint chips from lead-based paint (found in houses painted prior to 1950), and eating lead objects such as shot, fishing sinkers, or counterweights. Signs of poisoning include vomiting, diarrhea, blindness, seizures, and tremors.
- Raisins and grapes are potential causes of kidney failure in dogs.
- Garlic, onions, and chives are toxic to dogs. They cause the destruction of red blood cells known as Heinz body anemia, a form of hemolytic anemia. No clear quantity has been established as to the onset of the anemia. Poisonous reactions can result from raw, cooked or dried onions, garlic, and chives, including those included in powdered or dehydrated forms. Avoid all foods that contain onions or onion variants (such as spaghetti sauce).

== Miscellaneous ==
- Vestibular disease* is an uncommon condition in older dogs. Most cases are idiopathic, but it can also be caused by otitis interna, or inner ear infection, tumors, and encephalitis. Signs include nystagmus, head tilt, circling, vomiting, and falling to one side. Idiopathic vestibular disease will usually resolve in a few days to a few weeks.
- Molera (hole in skull), better known as an open fontanelle, may be a sign of hydrocephalus, but is also a normal finding in toy breeds such as Chihuahua.
- Anal gland problems are very common, and may include impaction, infection, or abscessation. These glands are normally emptied when the dog defecates.
- Shar Pei fever is characterized by recurring fever and swelling of the hocks in Shar Peis. It can result in renal and liver failure.
- Liver failure* is common. Signs include vomiting, loss of appetite, weight loss, and jaundice. Causes include bacterial or viral infection, toxic insult, cancer, copper storage diseases, or it may be idiopathic.
- Dental disease* is very common. Calculus is the most obvious sign, but gingivitis progressing to periodontitis is what results in tooth loss. Treatment involves scaling and polishing of the teeth under general anesthesia and treatment of any periodontal disease. Prevention is very important and can be accomplished through the use of special diets or treats, brushing, and plaque prevention gels.
- Portosystemic shunt* is a bypass of the liver by the body's circulatory system. It can be either a congenital or acquired condition.
- Perineal hernia* is characterized by herniation of abdominal contents through the pelvic diaphragm, which causes swelling on one side of the anus.
- Primary ciliary dyskinesia* is a dysfunction of cilia, which manifests as sperm immotility and respiratory disease. Signs include nasal discharge, recurring pneumonia, and infertility. Symptoms develop soon after birth.
- Cleft lip and cleft palate are uncommon and generally cause difficulty with nursing, and, more seriously aspiration pneumonia.
- Congenital diaphragmatic hernia* is uncommon, and is usually caused by trauma. Congenital diaphragmatic hernias are usually communications between the peritoneum and pericardium and are usually incidental findings.
- Gingival hyperplasia is seen in brachycephalic breeds, especially Boxers. It is generally benign, although food and hair impaction is common.
- Salmon poisoning disease is a fatal disease caused by infection with a rickettsia, either Neorickettsia helminthoeca or Neorickettsia elokominica. Dogs are infected by eating raw salmon from the Pacific Northwest.
- Vaccine reactions are adverse events which occur following vaccination, including granuloma formation, but most commonly the term vaccine reaction is used to describe a type I hypersensitivity reaction. The most common signs are facial swelling and hives, but more rarely very serious signs such as hypotension and collapse may occur.
- Systemic lupus erythematosus* (SLE) is an immune system disease characterized by the presence of antibodies to nucleic acid and/or antibodies to red blood cells, platelets, lymphocytes, clotting factors, and thyroglobulin. The disease can result in deposition of immune complexes or autoimmune disease. Immune complex deposition can cause vasculitis, meningitis, neuritis, and joint and skin disease. The most commons signs are hemolytic anemia or thrombocytopenia.
- Myasthenia gravis* results from the presence of antibodies to the acetylcholine receptor. Signs include megaesophagus and muscle weakness.
- Tetanus* is a disease caused by the bacteria Clostridium tetani following wound contamination. Dogs are not very susceptible to tetanus. Signs include difficulty opening the mouth and eating, contraction of the facial muscles, and rigid extension of the limbs. Dogs may also get localized tetanus, signs of which include stiffness of a limb spreading to the rest of the body.
- Polydactyly* is the occurrence of extra toes, generally on the preaxial (dewclaw) side. This is more common in certain breeds, such as the Great Pyrenees.
- Tracheal collapse is characterized by incomplete formation or weakening of the cartilagenous rings of the trachea. It is most common in small and toy breeds. Signs include a cough (often called a "goose honk cough" due to its sound), especially when excited.
- Brachycephalic airway obstructive syndrome is a condition of brachycephalic (short-nosed) dogs, characterized by the presence of stenotic nares, elongated soft palate, narrow trachea, collapsed larynx, and everted laryngeal saccules. Signs include difficult and noisy breathing. Surgical options are available.

== See also ==
- Dog health
- Mastocytoma in dogs
- Threadworm infections of dogs
- Parasites and pathogens of wolves
