= HGE =

HGE may refer to:

- Hemorrhagic gastroenteritis
- Hughes Glomar Explorer, a drillship
- Human granulocytic ehrlichiosis, today called human anaplasmosis
- Haaf's Game Engine, a DirectX based 2D game engine utilizing Direct3D for Windows
