= PDE =

PDE may refer to:

== Mathematics ==
- Partial differential equation, differential equation involving partial derivatives (of a function of multiple variables)

== Life sciences ==
- Phosphodiesterase, enzyme important in intracellular communication
- Pug dog encephalitis

== Organizations ==
- The European Democratic Party (esp. in Spanish, French or Italian languages)
- The Pennsylvania Department of Education

== Technology and engineering ==
- Program development environment
- Pulse detonation engine, proposed substitute to the traditional jet engine

== Philosophy ==
- Principle of double effect

== Places ==
- Punta del Este

== Other modes of abbreviation ==
- Polydichloric euthimal, fictional substance
- Pde (or Pde.), "Parade" (when serving as part of the proper name of a street or other way)
- Present Day English
- Preliminary Determination of Epicenters, the final earthquake bulletin of the National Earthquake Information Center (NEIC)
