= Canine gallbladder mucocele =

Biliary disease in dogs

Canine gallbladder mucocele (GBM) is an emerging biliary disease in dogs described as the excessive and abnormal accumulation of thick, gelatinous mucus in the lumen, which results in an enlarged gallbladder. GBMs have been diagnosed more frequently in comparison to prior to the 2000s when it was considered rare. The mucus is usually pale yellow to dark green in appearance.

The name originates from the Greek word kele meaning tumour as a mucocele resembles a mass. Although this disease is primarily identified in dogs, cats and ferrets have also been diagnosed.

== Anatomy and function ==
The gallbladder is an excretory organ that is pear-shaped and identified between two liver lobes. It is divided into three sections a body, neck and fundus. The main function of this excretory organ is storing, acidifying and concentrating bile. This is achieved due to the nature of the muscular sac being a thin wall that can easily distend to accommodate the bile. It is collected from the liver cells via small channels that pass through the hepatic ducts and into the gallbladder. After a fatty meal the bile is then released into the small intestine promoted by a hormone called cholecystokinin that is present in the pancreas.

This is important for canines in terms of digestive health as the bile can facilitate in breaking down large fat particles into smaller ones. And also enhances the intestinal absorption of nutrients including lipids, electrolytes and protein.

== Pathogenesis ==
The underlying pathogenesis and cause for a formation of a GBM is still yet to be identified. However, there is strong association with the rapid increase and hyperplasia of mucus-producing cells and hyper-secretion within the gallbladder epithelium. This will lead to distension which refers to the enlargement of something due to internal pressures. The pressure in this case is the thick mucus as it cannot be effectively expelled. Without proper treatment the severity increases as the thickened material can cause obstruction in the bile ducts. This results in the risk of gallbladder rupture which is life-threatening thus early diagnosis is necessary.

Additionally the composition of biliary sludge has been suggested to encourage the formation of a mucocele. Biliary sludge occurs when more water or mucin is reabsorbed and there is excessive bile salts. As this progresses more water is increased causing the contents to become more solid and severely decrease the motility of the gallbladder

It is most likely that there are multiple factors that contribute to the formation of a gallbladder mucocele.

== Predispositions ==
Most gallbladder mucoceles have been found in mid-age to older dogs with the median age being 9 with no sex predilection. This is because the abnormal enlargement of mucus-producing glands in the gallbladder is often seen as a common feature amongst older dogs. Smaller dogs including Cocker Spaniels, Miniature Schnauzers, Pomeranians and Shetland Sheepdogs are also predisposed to developing gallbladder mucoceles as the mutation ABCB4 gene has been associated and these breeds often show signs of lipid metabolism problems which can trigger the development.

Some other conditions that can predispose a dog to a GBM includes:

- endocrine diseases
- inflammatory bowel disease
- Cushing's disease
- gallbladder disorder
- gallbladder cyst formation
- high cholesterol
- pancreatitis

== Signs and symptoms ==
About 77% of dogs with a GBM display nonspecific and vague clinical signs that can last up to a week including;

- loss of appetite
- lethargy
- vomiting
- diarrhoea
- anorexia
- jaundice
- abdominal discomfort or pain
- fever
- abdominal distension
- dehydration
- excessive urination
- excessive thirst
- collapse from septic shock

While other dogs with mucoceles show no clinical signs.

== Diagnosis ==
The diagnosis of gallbladder mucoceles is done by veterinarians and is dependent on an ultrasound examination. Additional procedures and diagnostics include physical examination and blood tests. Blood-work may reveal liver issues caused by obstruction of the common bile duct caused by sludge from the Gall Bladder. Serum Biochemical Profile (CHEM) of affected dogs with a GBM have shown elevated liver enzymes.

- A urinalysis will provide information about the kidneys.
- Complete Blood Count (CBC) as it will show the basic information about the red blood cells, white blood cells and platelets. This is important as a dog with a gallbladder mucocele which is infected will display a higher amount of white blood cells in comparison to healthy dogs.

Thus a complete evaluation of all the major organ systems will be conducted during the diagnosis process. Ultrasound imaging is generally the only effective and accurate diagnostic technique. They are often diagnosed 'accidentally' when diagnosing gastrointestinal illness due to the vague symptoms. With the presence of a gallbladder mucocele, the ultrasound will reveal a thickened wall and an enlarged 'kiwi-like' gallbladder filled with immobile, echogenic bile meaning it is not gravity dependent. Another clear indication in the images is striated or stellate patterns surrounding a small amount of stationary bile. The ultrasonographic can also indicate whether the gallbladder has ruptured. Signs of this include a discontinuous wall and presence of free abdominal fluid without indication of the gallbladder at all.

Microbiologic sampling of the bile may also be conducted to identify potential bacterial infections including E.coli, Enterococcus, Staphylococcus, Enterobacter, Streptococcus, Micrococcus. The bile is collected via a method called cholecystocentesis which is an ultrasound guided laparoscopy. However, there is potential complications that may occur during this procedure including the bacteria entering the bloodstream, haemorrhaging and bile leakage.

== Treatment ==
Medical management is one option for select cases. Asymptomatic patients without the evidence of gallbladder rupture can be managed medically with a drug treatment plan formulated by a veterinarian however their GBM will not be resolved in this case. Antibiotics are prescribed for a period of 6 to 8 weeks to the patient depending on the bacteria that is isolated in the bacterial cultures and microbiologic sampling. The bile could also reveal more than one infection present, in this case a combination of medications is often given. To promote the excretion of excessive bile, choleretic drugs can also be prescribed to manage the GBM. This is used to increase the bile flow by deliberately minimising the cholesterol content in the bile as well as diluting the secretions to allow it to exit more freely via the bile ducts. This occurs due to a naturally occurring bile acid present in the drug called Ursodiol. Hepatoprotectants are simultaneously prescribed to protect the liver as the gallbladder lives between two liver lobes, it works to protect it from bile acids. Dogs who are being medically managed must be rechecked for mucoceles after 4 to 6 weeks of being on antibiotics. If there are no signs of improvement and the symptoms are worsening surgery is necessary.

Surgical removal of the gallbladder also known as cholecystectomy is recommended at initial detection to avoid spontaneous gallbladder rupture since the rate of leakage or rupture is unpredictable this also removes the potential for a reoccurring GBM. If the patient shows clinical signs, abnormal blood work and pain the removal of the gall bladder is necessary. In case of rupture they should undergo immediate emergency surgery.

Before surgery begins preoperative tests must be conducted to look at a patient's blood count, urine analysis, serum chemistry profile and coagulation panel. This is to ensure that all results and levels are normal and do not display anything that isn't expected. This is necessary to commence surgery. However this would have been completed during the diagnosing process unless immediate surgery is necessary. All patients are also given appropriate intravenous fluids and electrolytes. These steps are necessary to reduce the risks of anaesthesia because most patients are older aged dogs.

During surgical procedures the whole abdominal cavity is checked in case of any concurrent and or occult problems. The bile ducts will be commonly be expressed to perform biopsies of the liver as well as the collection of bile and liver samples for further diagnosis. If the patients gallbladder has ruptured the cavity will be extensively flushed and the abdominal drained.

In some cases which are more severe, particularly when the canines gallbladder has already ruptured, feeding tubes may be placed preemptively if the veterinarian is concerned about their ability to eat post surgery. If the common bile duct is plugged, the surgeon may have to open the duodenum opposite of where the common bile duct enters the small intestine and flush it with a catheter.

Some complications that may occur due to this procedure includes vomiting, bile peritonitis if bile leaks into the abdominal cavity, pancreatitis and in some cases death. The mortality rate for this ranges between 22 and 32%, with approx. a two-week mortality. Patients that successfully undergo and complete surgery show excellent long-term survival.

== After care ==
After surgery, intravenous fluids will be continued to ensure the canine's hydration as well as pain-reliefs to ensure complete recovery. They will also remain hospitalised for up to 48 hours so that veterinarians can monitor their behaviour and response to surgery especially their appetite.

Once released back home the incision from surgery should be frequently checked to avoid infection, the use of an Elizabethan collar may be necessary to prevent them from licking the wound. For 14 days their exercise regime must be restricted and they must avoid running, jumping, stairs and extensive off leash activity. Antibiotics will be prescribed to any infections found from the culture taken during surgery. A low fat diet is also often recommended by veterinarians to reduce further complications in the future.
