= Atypical canine infectious respiratory disease complex =

Proposed respiratory disease in dogs

Atypical canine infectious respiratory disease complex (aCIRDC) is a proposed novel respiratory disease in dogs of unknown cause. It has been recorded in 19 US states, with more cases on the West Coast.

It has also been referred to as respiratory syndrome of unknown aetiology in dogs and as canine respiratory disease of unknown origin.

== History ==
It was first described in summer 2023 as a cluster of 200 cases around Portland, Oregon.

== Characteristics ==
Symptoms include a cough, fever, lethargy, sneezing and watery eyes. In some cases, the illness proceeds to death. Cases tend to fit three clinical syndromes: chronic mild/moderate tracheobronchitis of prolonged duration (6+ weeks), with coughing, sneezing, and watery eyes; chronic pneumonia that is minimally responsive to antimicrobials, possibly including dyspnea; and, rarely, acute pneumonia that rapidly becomes severe and can lead to death. Most cases are self-limiting and respond well to supportive care. Antibiotics may be indicated.

Diagnosis should rule out known forms of canine infectious respiratory disease complex (CIRDC; also known as kennel cough). aCIRDC does not respond to regular treatment protocols for CIRDC and the course of the disease is longer and more severe.

There is no evidence that it can spread to humans.

== Cause ==
The cause is currently unknown.

The Veterinary Diagnostic Laboratory at the University of New Hampshire put forth a possible bacterium as the cause. They tentatively identified this as IOLA KY405, which was previously identified in humans in 2021. This is similar to Mycoplasma in lacking a cell wall and having a small genome. However, subsequent work ruled this out.

However, other vets have suggested that aCIRDC might just represent a peak in CIRDC cases and not involve any new pathogens. This could be due to changes in human behaviour following the end of COVID-19 lockdowns and other COVID-19-related disruption to veterinary care (e.g. frequency of vaccination), as well as to the general increase in dog numbers in the US. A 2025 study concluded that the pattern of atypical CIRDC cases was not associated with a novel pathogen or any one pathogen.

== See also ==
- 2022 hepatitis of unknown origin in children
