= Parasites and pathogens of wolves =

Organisms causing disease in wolves

Wolves may suffer from various pathogens, both viral and bacterial, and parasite, both external and internal. Parasitic infection in wolves is of particular concern to people. Wolves can spread them to dogs, which in turn can carry the parasites to humans. In areas where wolves inhabit pastoral areas, the parasites can be spread to livestock.

== Diseases ==
Footage of a wolf taken from Abruzzo Natural Park showing advanced signs of canine distemper

=== Viral ===
Viral diseases carried by wolves include: rabies, canine distemper, canine parvovirus, infectious canine hepatitis, papillomatosis, and canine coronavirus. Wolves are a major host for rabies in Russia, Iran, Afghanistan, Iraq and India. In wolves, the incubation period is eight to 21 days, and results in the host becoming agitated, deserting its pack, and travelling up to 80 km (50 mi) a day, thus increasing the risk of infecting other wolves. Infected wolves do not show any fear of humans, most documented wolf attacks on people being attributed to rabid animals. Although canine distemper is lethal in dogs, it has not been recorded to kill wolves, except in Canada and Alaska. The canine parvovirus, which causes death by dehydration, electrolyte imbalance, and endotoxic shock or sepsis, is largely survivable in wolves, but can be lethal to pups. Wolves may catch infectious canine hepatitis from dogs, though there are no records of wolves dying from it. Papillomatosis has been recorded only once in wolves, and likely does not cause serious illness or death, though it may alter feeding behaviours. The canine coronavirus has been recorded in Alaskan wolves, infections being most prevalent in winter months.

=== Bacterial ===
Bacterial diseases carried by wolves include: brucellosis, Lyme disease, leptospirosis, tularemia, bovine tuberculosis, listeriosis and anthrax. Wolves can catch Brucella suis from wild and domestic reindeer. While adult wolves tend not to show any clinical signs, it can severely weaken the pups of infected females. Although lyme disease can debilitate individual wolves, it does not appear to significantly affect wolf populations. Leptospirosis can be contracted through contact with infected prey or urine, and can cause fever, anorexia, vomiting, anemia, hematuria, icterus, and death. Wolves living near farms are more vulnerable to the disease than those living in the wilderness, probably because of prolonged contact with infected domestic animal waste. Wolves may catch tularemia from lagomorph prey, though its effect on wolves is unknown. Although bovine tuberculosis is not considered a major threat to wolves, it has been recorded to have killed two wolf pups in Canada.

== Parasitic ==
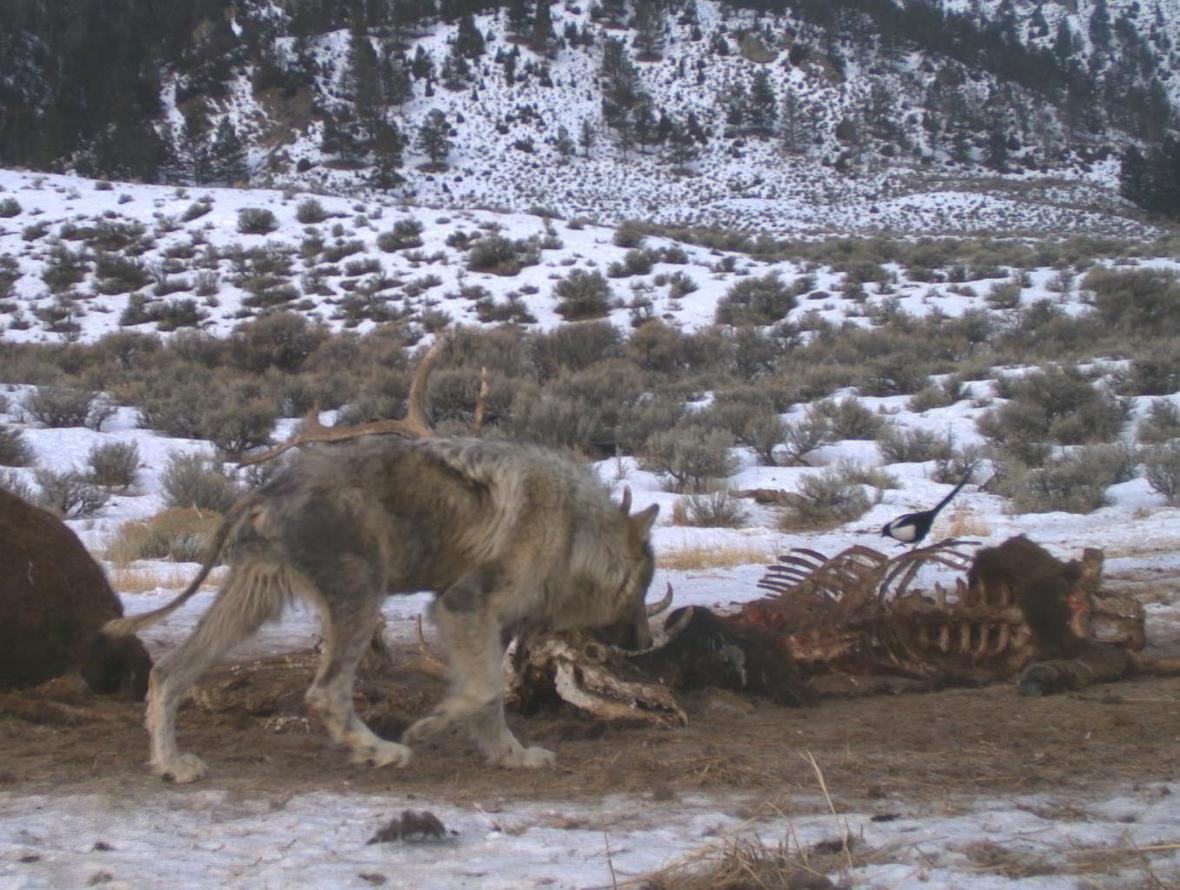
In Yellowstone National Park

Wolves carry ectoparasites and endoparasites; those in the former Soviet Union have been recorded to carry at least 50 species. Most of these parasites infect wolves without adverse effects, though the effects may become more serious in sick or malnourished specimens.

=== Extoparasites ===
Wolves are often infested with a variety of arthropod exoparasites, including fleas, ticks, lice, and mites. The most harmful to wolves, particularly pups, is the mange mite (Sarcoptes scabiei), though they rarely develop full-blown mange, unlike foxes. Lice, such as Trichodectes canis, may cause sickness in wolves, but rarely death. Ticks of the genus Ixodes can infect wolves with Lyme disease and Rocky Mountain spotted fever. The tick Dermacentor pictus also infests wolves. Other ectoparasites include chewing lice, sucking lice and the fleas Pulex irritans and Ctenocephalides canis.

=== Endopatasites ===
Endoparasites known to infect wolves include: protozoans and helminths (flukes, tapeworms, roundworms and thorny-headed worms). Of 30,000 protozoan species, only a few have been recorded to infect wolves: Isospora, Toxoplasma, Sarcocystis, Babesia, and Giardia. Some wolves carry Neospora caninum, which can be spread to cattle and is correlated with bovine miscarriages.

Among flukes, the most common in North American wolves is Alaria, which infects small rodents and amphibians which are eaten by wolves. Upon reaching maturity, Alaria migrates to the wolf's intestine, but does little harm. Metorchis conjunctus, which enters wolves through eating fish, infects the wolf's liver or gall bladder, causing liver disease, inflammation of the pancreas, and emaciation. Most other fluke species reside in the wolf's intestine, though Paragonimus westermani lives in the lungs. Tapeworms are commonly found in wolves, as their primary hosts are ungulates, small mammals, and fish, which wolves feed upon. Tapeworms generally cause little harm in wolves, though this depends on the number and size of the parasites, and the sensitivity of the host. Symptoms often include constipation, toxic and allergic reactions, irritation of the intestinal mucosa, and malnutrition. Infections by the tapeworm Echinococcus granulosus in ungulate populations tend to increase in areas with high wolf densities, as wolves can shed Echinoccocus eggs in their feces onto grazing areas.

Wolves can carry over 30 roundworm species, though most roundworm infections appear benign, depending on the number of worms and the age of the host. Ancylostoma caninum attaches itself on the intestinal wall to feed on the host's blood, and can cause hyperchromic anemia, emaciation, diarrhea, and possibly death. Toxocara canis, a hookworm known to infect wolf pups in the uterus, can cause intestinal irritation, bloating, vomiting, and diarrhea. Wolves may catch Dioctophyma renale from minks, which infects the kidneys, and can grow to lengths of 100 cm (40 in). D. renale causes the complete destruction of the kidney's functional tissue and can be fatal if both kidneys are infected. Wolves can tolerate low levels of Dirofilaria immitis for many years without showing any ill effects, though high levels can kill wolves through cardiac enlargement and congestive hepatopathy. Wolves probably become infected with Trichinella spiralis by eating infected ungulates. Although T. spiralis is not known to produce clinical signs in wolves, it can cause emaciation, salivation, and crippling muscle pains in dogs. Thorny-headed worms rarely infect wolves, though three species have been identified in Russian wolves: Nicolla skrjabini, Macracanthorhynchus catulinus, and Moniliformis moniliformis.

== See also ==
- Dog health
- List of dog diseases
