= IOLA KY405 =

Bacterium

IOLA KY405 is an uncultured human respiratory tract-associated bacterium identified by a genomic approach in 2021.

The genome is AT-rich and very small.

The bacterium was tentatively linked to atypical Canine Infectious Respiratory Disease Complex. However, subsequent work ruled this out.
