= Collie eye anomaly =

Congenital eye disease of dogs

Collie eye anomaly (CEA) is a congenital, inherited, bilateral eye disease of dogs, which affects the retina, choroid, and sclera. It can be a mild disease or cause blindness. CEA is caused by a simple autosomal recessive gene defect. There is no treatment.

== Affected breeds ==
It is known to occur in Collies (smooth and rough collies), Shetland Sheepdogs, Australian Shepherds, Border Collies, Lancashire Heelers, Nova Scotia Duck Tolling Retrievers, and the Hokkaido. Frequency is high in Collies and Shetland Sheepdogs, and low in Border Collies and NSDTRs. In the United States, incidence in the genotype of collies has been estimated to be as high as 95 percent, with a phenotypic incidence of 80 to 85 percent.

== Pathogenesis ==
CEA is caused by improper development of the eye. Failure of the cells of the posterior portion of the optic vesicles to express growth hormone affects the differentiation of other cells of the eye. The choroid, especially lateral to the optic disc, is hypoplastic (underdeveloped). A coloboma, or hole, may form in or near the optic disc due to a failed closure of embryonic tissue. The degree of these abnormalities varies between individual dogs, and even between the same dog's eyes. CEA is inherited as an autosomal recessive trait that has a penetrance reaching 100 percent. A mutation in the NHEJ1 gene is responsible.

== Signs ==
The most common sign of CEA is the presence of an area of undeveloped choroid (appearing as a pale spot) lateral to the optic disc. The choroid is a collection of blood vessels supplying the retina. CEA can also cause retinal or scleral coloboma, coloboma of the optic disc, retinal detachment, or intraocular hemorrhage. It can be diagnosed by fundoscopy by the age of six or seven weeks. Severe cases may be blind.

== Breeding and testing ==
Controversies exist around eliminating this disorder from breeding Collies. Some veterinarians advocate only breeding dogs with no evidence of disease, but this would eliminate a large portion of potential breeding stock. Because of this, others recommend only breeding mildly affected dogs, but this would never completely eradicate the condition. Also, mild cases of choroidal hypoplasia may become pigmented and therefore undiagnosable by the age of three to seven months. If puppies are not checked for CEA before this happens, they may be mistaken for normal and bred as such. Checking for CEA by seven weeks of age can eliminate this possibility. Diagnosis is also difficult in dogs with coats of dilute color because lack of pigment in the choroid of these animals can be confused with choroidal hypoplasia. Also, because of the lack of choroidal pigment, mild choroidal hypoplasia is difficult to see, and therefore cases of CEA may be missed.

Until recently, the only way to know if a dog was a carrier was for it to produce an affected puppy. However, a genetic test for CEA became available at the beginning of 2005, developed by the Baker Institute for Animal Health, Cornell University, and administered through OptiGen. The test can determine whether a dog is affected, a carrier, or clear, and is therefore a useful tool in determining a particular dog's suitability for breeding.
