= Polyneuropathy in dogs and cats =

Polyneuropathy in dogs and cats is a collection of peripheral nerve disorders that often are breed-related in these animals. Polyneuropathy indicates that multiple nerves are involved, unlike mononeuropathy. Polyneuropathy usually involves motor nerve dysfunction, also known as lower motor neuron disease. Symptoms include decreased or absent reflexes and muscle tone, weakness, or paralysis. It often occurs in the rear legs and is bilateral. Most are chronic problems with a slow onset of symptoms, but some occur suddenly.

== Most common types of polyneuropathy ==
- Birman cat distal polyneuropathy is an inherited disorder caused by decreased numbers of myelinated axons in the central and peripheral nervous systems. Astrogliosis (an increase in the number of astrocytes) is also noted. The lesions are most commonly found in the lateral pyramidal tract of the lumbar spinal cord, the fasciculi gracili of the dorsal column of the cervical spinal cord, and the cerebellar vermian white matter. Symptoms start at the age of 8 to 10 weeks, and include frequent falling and walking on the hock. The prognosis is poor. The disease is suspected to have a recessive mode of inheritance.
- Botulism is very rare in dogs and usually follows feeding on carrion. Symptoms include weakness, difficulty eating, acute facial nerve paralysis, and megaesophagus. Compared to other species, dogs and cats are relatively resistant to botulism.
- Dancing Doberman disease primarily affects the gastrocnemius muscle in Dobermans. It usually starts between the ages of 6 and 7 months. One rear leg will flex while standing. Over the next few months, it will begin to affect the other rear leg. Eventually, the dog is alternatively flexing and extending each rear leg in a dancing motion. Dancing Doberman disease progresses over a few years to rear leg weakness and muscle atrophy. No treatment is known, but most dogs retain the ability to walk and it is painless.
- Diabetes neuropathy is more common in cats than dogs. It is caused in part by prolonged hyperglycemia (high blood sugar) and results in dysfunction of one or both tibial nerves and a plantigrade stance (down on the hocks). It may resolve with treatment of the diabetes. The pathology of this condition in cats has been shown to be very similar to diabetic neuropathy in humans.
- Distal symmetric polyneuropathy symptoms include atrophy of the distal leg muscles and the muscles of the head, and rear limb weakness. No treatment is known and the prognosis is poor. This is most commonly seen in Chesapeake Bay Retrievers, St. Bernards, Great Danes, Newfoundlands, Collies, and Labrador Retrievers.
- Dysautonomia is primarily seen in cats. Symptoms include vomiting, depression, anorexia, weight loss, dilated pupils, third eyelid protrusion, sneezing, slow heart rate, and megaesophagus. The prognosis is poor and supportive treatment is necessary. Recovery in cats may take up to one year.
- Giant axonal neuropathy is a rare disease in the German Shepherd. It usually becomes evident between the ages of 14 and 16 months. Symptoms include rear limb weakness, decreased reflexes, muscle atrophy, megaesophagus, and loss of bark. No treatment is known and it has a poor prognosis.
- Hyperchylomicronemia or hyperlipoproteinemia is a type of inherited hyperlipidemia in cats. Polyneuropathy is caused by stretching or compression of nerves near bone by xanthomas, which are lipid deposits. It can cause Horner's syndrome, facial nerve paralysis, and femoral nerve, tibial nerve, radial nerve, trigeminal nerve, or recurrent laryngeal nerve paralysis.
- Hypertrophic neuropathy is also known as canine inherited demyelinative neuropathy (CIDN) and is inherited in the Tibetan Mastiff. Symptoms usually start between the ages of 7 and 10 weeks, and include weakness, decreased reflexes, and loss of bark. Sensory function remains, but a poor gait or an inability to walk may present. With no treatment available, the prognosis is guarded. The trait is inherited as an autosomal recessive.
- Hypoglycemia-induced polyneuropathy is especially seen in conjunction with insulinoma.
- Myasthenia gravis
- Polyradiculoneuritis is inflammation of the nerve roots. The most common type is Coonhound paralysis. This is similar to Guillain–Barré syndrome in humans. Coonhound paralysis seems to be secondary to a raccoon bite, probably due to some factor in the saliva. However, it can also occur without any interaction with a raccoon. It can happen in any breed of dog. When associated with a raccoon bite, the symptoms start 7 to 11 days after the bite, and include rear leg weakness progressing rapidly to paresis, and decreased reflexes. When not associated with a raccoon bite, the same symptoms occur, with the paresis taking about 3–4 days to reach its maximum effect. Severe cases have a loss of bark, trouble breathing, and an inability to lift the head. Typically, the duration of the paralysis is 2 to 3 months, but can last up to 6 months. Treatment is proper nursing care, and the prognosis is good in mild cases. In bad cases, the dog does not completely recover the initial muscular capability but still is able to live for years. In very bad cases, breathing can be impaired, and unless the dog is placed on a ventilator, suffocation will occur. Polyradiculoneuritis has also been seen 1-2o weeks after vaccination in dogs and cats. It can also be caused by toxoplasmosis.
- Rottweiler distal sensorimotor polyneuropathy is characterized by distal muscle denervation, but the cause is unknown. It affects young adult Rottweilers. The symptoms include weakness of all four legs and decreased reflexes. The disease is gradually progressive. Treatment is possible with corticosteroids, but the prognosis is poor.
- Sensory neuropathies are inherited conditions in dogs and cause an inability to feel pain and a loss of proprioception. Self-mutilation is often seen. No treatment has been found, and the prognosis is poor in severe cases. Several breeds are affected:
  - Boxer symptoms usually occur around two months of age as a slowly progressive disease.
  - Dachshund (longhaired) disease usually occurs between 8 and 12 weeks of age, and causes urinary incontinence, loss of pain sensation all over the body, and penis mutilation. It is probably inherited as an autosomal recessive trait.
  - English Pointer illness usually occurs between the ages of 3 and 8 months and most commonly involves licking and biting at the paws. No treatment is known and a poor prognosis is given. It is inherited as an autosomal recessive trait.
- Spinal muscular atrophy occurs in cats and dogs, and is caused by the death of nerve cells in the spinal cord. This progressive disease has no known treatment and a poor prognosis. Affected dog breeds include the Swedish Lapland Dog, Brittany Spaniel, English Pointer, German Shepherd dog, Rottweiler, and Cairn Terrier. Maine Coons are one of the affected cat breeds.
- Tick paralysis is an acute, ascending motor paralysis that occurs in dogs and cats. The cause is a neurotoxin in the saliva of certain species of adult ticks. Dermacentor species predominate as a cause in North America, while Ixodes species mainly cause the disease in Australia. The onset of symptoms is 5 to 9 days after tick attachment, and include incoordination progressing to paralysis, changed voice, and difficulty eating. Death can occur secondary to paralysis of the respiratory muscles, but in North America, a good prognosis results once the ticks are removed. Recovery is usually in 1 to 3 days. In Australia, however, it is a more severe disease with cranial nerve effects, and death can occur in 1 to 2 days.
- Toxic neuropathies are most commonly caused by vincristine, thallium, and lead. In cats, the symptoms include paresis, hyporeflexia, and muscle tremors.
