= Retinal dysplasia =

Eye disease

Retinal dysplasia is an eye disease affecting the retina of animals and, less commonly, humans. It is usually a nonprogressive disease and can be caused by viral infections, drugs, vitamin A deficiency, or genetic defects. Retinal dysplasia is characterized by folds or rosettes (round clumps) of the retinal tissue.

== Retinal dysplasia in dogs ==
Most cases of retinal dysplasia in dogs are hereditary. It can involve one or both retinas. Retinal dysplasia can be focal, multifocal, geographic, or accompanied by retinal detachment. Focal and multifocal retinal dysplasia appears as streaks and dots in the central retina. Geographic retinal dysplasia appears as an irregular or horseshoe-shaped area of mixed hyper or hyporeflectivity in the central retina. Retinal detachment occurs with complete retinal dysplasia, and is accompanied by blindness in that eye. Cataracts or glaucoma can also occur secondary to retinal dysplasia. Other causes of retinal dysplasia in dogs include infection with canine adenovirus or canine herpesvirus, or radiation of the eye in newborns.

=== Commonly affected breeds ===
- Bedlington Terrier - complete retinal dysplasia.
- Sealyham Terrier - complete retinal dysplasia.
- Rottweiler - focal or multifocal.
- English Springer Spaniel - focal, multifocal, or geographic.
- American Cocker Spaniel - focal or multifocal.
- Beagle - focal or multifocal.
- Cavalier King Charles Spaniel - retinal folds, geographic, or retinal detachment.
- Labrador Retriever - focal, multifocal, geographic, or complete retinal dysplasia. It can also be seen in combination with a congenital skeletal disorder.
- Australian Shepherd - retinal dysplasia occurs with other eye disorders, such as an oval pupil, microcornea (small cornea), cataracts, and retinal detachment.

== Retinal dysplasia in other animals ==
- Cats - Retinal dysplasia occurs in utero or in newborns infected with feline leukemia virus or feline panleukopenia, which cause necrosis and disorganization of the retina. It appears as folds and rosettes.
- Cattle - Retinal dysplasia occurs in utero through infection with bovine viral diarrhea. It is also inherited in Shorthorns and Herefords. Both forms often cause retinal detachment.
- Sheep - Retinal dysplasia occurs by in utero infection with bluetongue disease.
- Horses - Retinal dysplasia is bilateral, not inherited, and appears as multifocal or geographic disease. It is usually accompanied by other eye problems.
- Chickens

== See also ==
- Progressive retinal atrophy
