= Bilious vomiting syndrome =

Condition in dogs due to not eating at night

Bilious vomiting syndrome in dogs is vomiting in response to bile-induced inflammation of the stomach. It is also known as reflux gastritis syndrome and duodenal-gastric reflux. Bile salts interfere with the gastric mucosal barrier, allowing acid to irritate the stomach lining and cause gastritis.

Dogs with this condition usually vomit in the morning after not eating all night. Treatment is to feed late at night. H2 blockers and antiemetics can also be used. Bilious vomiting syndrome is a diagnosis of exclusion, meaning that the dog is normal otherwise and no other causes of the vomiting have been found.
