= Granulomatous meningoencephalitis =

Inflammatory disease of the central nervous system of dogs

Granulomatous meningoencephalitis (GME) is an inflammatory disease of the central nervous system (CNS) of dogs and, rarely, cats. It is a form of meningoencephalitis. GME is likely second only to encephalitis caused by canine distemper virus as the most common cause of inflammatory disease of the canine CNS. The disease is more common in female dogs of young and middle age. It has a rapid onset. The lesions of GME exist mainly in the white matter of the cerebrum, brainstem, cerebellum, and spinal cord. The cause is only known to be noninfectious and is considered at this time to be idiopathic. Because lesions resemble those seen in allergic meningoencephalitis, GME is thought to have an immune-mediated cause, but it is also thought that the disease may be based on an abnormal response to an infectious agent. One study searched for viral DNA from canine herpesvirus, canine adenovirus, and canine parvovirus in brain tissue from dogs with GME, necrotizing meningoencephalitis, and necrotizing leukoencephalitis (see below for the latter two conditions), but failed to find any.

== Types of GME ==
- Disseminated – This is a diffuse disease throughout the CNS. It was previously known as inflammatory reticulosis. There is an accumulation of mononuclear cells and neutrophils around the blood vessels (perivascular) of the CNS. Meningitis is seen with this form of GME and causes fever and neck pain. It has an acute progression over a few weeks. Symptoms include incoordination, nystagmus, head tilt, seizures, and depression.
- Focal – The disease presents as a granuloma, which mimics a tumor. It usually is found in the cerebrum or cerebellopontine angle. Symptoms may be acute or develop slowly over several months and depend on the location of the lesion.
- Ocular – This is an uncommon form of GME and is characterized by sudden blindness caused by optic neuritis. The disease is bilateral. Ocular GME is considered to be an extension of CNS disease. The blood vessels of the posterior segment of the eye and anterior uvea have the same infiltrates of inflammatory cells as the intracranial vessels. Uveitis, retinal detachment, and secondary glaucoma may be seen.

== Diagnosis and treatment ==
Cerebrospinal fluid (CSF) analysis shows a large number of white blood cells. Typically small mature lymphocytes are the majority of cells seen, with monocytes and neutrophils making up the rest. Definitive diagnosis is based on histopathology, either a brain biopsy or post-mortem evaluation (necropsy). A CT scan or MRI will show patchy, diffuse, or multifocal lesions. For a number of years, the basic treatment was some type of corticosteroid in combination with one or more immunosuppressive drugs, typically cytosine arabinoside and/or cyclosporine or other medications such as azathioprine, cyclophosphamide, or procarbazine, of which were usually added one at a time to the corticosteroid until a successful combination was found. There is evidence that treatment with radiation therapy for focal GME provides the longest periods of remission.

== Pug dog encephalitis ==
Pug dog encephalitis (PDE) is an idiopathic inflammatory disease primarily affecting the prosencephalon (forebrain and thalamus). It is also known as necrotizing meningoencephalitis. The disease may be inherited in Pugs and Maltese and has been diagnosed in other breeds as well (Yorkies, Chihuahuas). The prevalence of PDE in pugs is about 1%. It differs in pathology from GME by more tissue breakdown and increased eosinophils (white blood cells). CSF analysis is also unique among inflammatory CNS diseases in dogs in that the cells are predominantly lymphocytes, instead of a mixed population of mononuclear cells. In Maltese and Pugs, there is extensive necrosis and inflammation of the gray matter of the cerebrum and subcortical white matter. The most common early symptoms are related to forebrain disease and include seizures and dementia, and later circling, head tilt, and blindness with normal pupillary light reflexes may be seen. PDE has a poor prognosis.

== Necrotizing leukoencephalitis ==
In Yorkshire Terriers there can be severe mononuclear inflammation of the brainstem and periventricular cerebral white matter. Because the condition in this breed frequently affects only the white matter, it has been called necrotizing leukoencephalitis. Symptoms of brainstem and central vestibular disease predominate.

== Other types of noninfectious meningoencephalitis ==
- Steroid-responsive meningoencephalitis is any noninfectious meningoencephalitis that responds well to corticosteroids and usually has an excellent prognosis. This could represent mild forms of GME or PDE, but there are two separate conditions recognized also.
  - Steroid-responsive meningitis/arteritis, also known as necrotizing vasculitis, is seen most commonly in Beagles, Boxers, Bernese Mountain Dogs, and German Shorthaired Pointers younger than two years of age. Many cases have fever, loss of appetite, and severe neck pain without other neurologic symptoms, although long-term cases may have incoordination and limb weakness or paralysis. CSF analysis shows predominantly neutrophils. In Beagles this condition is also known as Beagle pain syndrome.
  - Eosinophilic meningoencephalomyelitis is seen mainly in Golden Retrievers. CSF analysis shows predominantly eosinophils.
- An acute progressive pyogranulomatous meningoencephalomyelitis is seen in mature Pointer dogs. There is monocytic and neutrophilic infiltration of the leptomeninges. Symptoms include incoordination, reluctance to move, and neck rigidity.

== See also ==
- Encephalitis
- Meningitis
