= Tracheobronchitis =

Inflammation of the trachea and bronchi

Tracheobronchitis is inflammation of the trachea and bronchi. It is characterised by a cough, fever, and purulent (containing pus) sputum and is therefore suggestive of pneumonia. It is classified as a respiratory tract infection.

Tracheobronchitis is often a hospital-acquired infection, particularly in an intensive care setting, associated with the use of mechanical ventilators, and the need for inserting a tracheal tube. In these cases it is known as ventilator-associated tracheobronchitis. The infection begins in the trachea where it colonises and spreads to the bronchi.

The characteristic increased sputum produced can give problems in the removal of the tracheal tube (extubation). Tracheobronchial infections are responsible for up to 80% of exacerbations in chronic obstructive pulmonary disease.

== Causes ==
Ventilator-associated tracheobronchitis is a hospital-acquired infection usually contracted in an intensive care unit when a mechanical ventilator is used. The insertion of a tracheal tube can cause an infection in the trachea which then colonises and spreads to the bronchi. If there is further spread and development into the lungs this will give rise to ventilator-associated pneumonia. Antibiotics are recommended to prevent this development but only as a short term measure as antibiotic resistance is already high in some of the pathogens involved. This does not always progress to pneumonia.

Fungal tracheobronchitis can be invasive into the lung tissue or pulmonary artery and cause a severe lung infection. The extra secreted mucus from tracheobronchitis plugs the airways allowing the fungal pathogens to lodge and multiply. Local damage to the tracheal wall that can be caused by mechanical ventilation is a risk factor for this. Respiratory failure may develop from this infection.

Herpetic tracheobronchitis is caused by herpes simplex virus and causes small ulcers covered in exudate to form on the mucous membranes. The exudate contains necrotic cells from the mucosal epithelium.

The characteristic increased sputum produced can give problems in the removal of the tracheal tube (extubation). In the course of cystic fibrosis the lungs are affected. Thickened mucus secretions block the airways making infection possible. The recurrence of tracheobronchitis presents a major problem.

In chronic obstructive pulmonary disease tracheobronchial infections are responsible for up to 80% of exacerbations.

== In dogs ==
Tracheobronchitis often affects dogs particularly those confined in kennels where their persistent barking worsens the inflammation. This canine infectious tracheobronchitis is more usually known as kennel cough.
