= Canine herpesvirus =

Virus classification
- (unranked): Virus
- Realm: Duplodnaviria
- Kingdom: Heunggongvirae
- Phylum: Peploviricota
- Class: Herviviricetes
- Order: Herpesvirales
- Family: Orthoherpesviridae
- Genus: Varicellovirus
- Species: Varicellovirus canidalpha1

Synonyms
- Canid alphaherpesvirus 1; Canid herpesvirus 1; Canine herpesvirus

Species of virus

Canine herpesvirus (CHV) is a species of virus of the family Orthoherpesviridae which most importantly causes a fatal hemorrhagic disease in puppies (and in wild Canidae) less than two to three weeks old. It is known to exist in the United States, Canada, Australia, Japan, England and Germany. CHV was first recognized in the mid-1960s from a fatal disease in puppies.

== CHV in puppies ==
The incubation period of CHV is six to ten days. CHV is transmitted to puppies in the birth canal and by contact with infected oral and nasal secretions from the mother or other infected dogs, but it is not spread through the air. The virus replicates in the surface cells of the nasal mucosa, tonsils, and pharynx. Low body temperature allows the virus to spread and infect the rest of the body. Symptoms include crying, weakness, depression, discharge from the nose, soft, yellow feces, and a loss of the sucking reflex. CHV also causes a necrotizing vasculitis that results in hemorrhage around the blood vessels. Bruising of the belly may occur. Eye lesions include keratitis, uveitis, optic neuritis, retinitis, and retinal dysplasia. There is a high mortality rate, approaching 80 percent in puppies less than one week old, and death usually occurs in one to two days.

In puppies three to five weeks old, the disease is less severe due to their ability to properly maintain body temperature and mount a febrile response. More puppies survive, but they can develop a latent infection, they can also develop petechial hemorrhages in the kidney due to vasculitis. Some later get neurologic disease and have symptoms like difficulty walking and blindness. Reactivation of a latent infection may be caused by stress or immunosuppressive drugs such as corticosteroids. The site of latency has been shown to be the trigeminal ganglion and possibly the lumbosacral ganglion.

== CHV in adult dogs ==
In adult dogs, the virus infects the reproductive tract, which allows it to be sexually transmitted or passed to puppies during birth. The disease can cause abortion, stillbirths, and infertility. It is also an infrequent cause of kennel cough. However, sexual contact is not the primary cause of transmission. Most adult dogs become infected by inhaling the virus via airborne particles spread by coughs or sneezes. It can also be contracted by drinking from a contaminated water bowl, or even just by sniffing or licking another dog that is shedding the virus.

Like other types of herpesvirus, previously infected dogs can from time to time release the virus in vaginal secretions, penile secretions, and discharge from the nose. Raised sores in the vagina or on the penis may be seen during these times. Spread of the disease is controlled by not breeding dogs known to have it. Serology can show which dogs have been exposed (although not all of them will be releasing the virus at that time). Serological studies of various dog populations have revealed a seroprevalence of 40 to 93 percent. Bitches who have a negative serology for CHV should be isolated from other dogs from three weeks before to three weeks after giving birth. Bitches that have lost puppies to the disease may have future litters that survive due to transfer of antibodies in the milk.

== Diagnosis, treatment, and control ==
Diagnosis of the disease in puppies is best accomplished by necropsy. Findings include hemorrhages in the kidneys, liver, lungs, and gastrointestinal tract. Treatment of affected puppies is difficult, although injecting antibodies to CHV into the abdomen may help some to survive. Keeping the puppies warm is also important. The virus does not survive well outside of the body and is easily destroyed by most detergents. A vaccine in Europe known as Eurican Herpes 205 (ATCvet code: QI07AA06) has been available since 2003. It is given to the dam (mother) twice: during heat or early pregnancy and one to two weeks before whelping.

=== Dog pox ===
Dog pox is an infection of canines which may be caused by the canine herpes virus, and can result in symptoms ranging from no symptoms to inflammation of the respiratory or digestive tract to skin inflammation and lesions. Over 60% of adult male dogs exhibit lesions as a result of this infection. It can result in reduction of epithelial function in the intestine.

== Research ==
Studies of using CHV as a viral vector for gene therapy in dogs and as a basis for recombinant vaccines are ongoing. Its use as a vector in bait-delivered oral vaccines in wild foxes is also being investigated.
