= Immune-mediated thrombocytopaenia =

Immune related haematological animal disease

- Other names: Immune-mediated thrombocytopenia
- Specialty: Haematology
- Symptoms: Lethargy, anorexia, pyrexia, haemorrhage, bruising
- Complications: Platelet destruction
- Usual onset: Between >1 and 14 years
- Causes: Underlying condition (secondary IMT only)
- Risk factors: Bitches, certain breeds, neuter status
- Diagnostic method: Platelet count measurement (both) and exclusion of underlying conditions (primary)
- Treatment: Immunosuppression, steroids, blood transfusion, therapeutic plasma exchange
- Medication: Corticosteroids, azathioprine, prednisone
- Prognosis: 74-97% short term survival rate

Immune-mediated thrombocytopaenia (IMT) is a disease common in dogs and rare in cats. The disease is characterised by a low platelet count caused by destruction of the platelets from the immune system. IMT is the most common cause of thrombocytopaenia in dogs.

== Signs and symptoms ==
Common symptoms of IMT include lethargy, anorexia, pyrexia, haemorrhage, and bruising. Destruction of platelets occurs when immunoglobins attach to the surface of the platelet, which causes macrophages to initiate phagocytosis. IMT is differentiated from other forms of thrombocytopaenia by the immune-mediated component of the condition.

== Causes ==
=== Primary immune-mediated thrombocytopaenia ===
The immune system mistakenly destroying normal thrombocytes is pathognomonic of primary IMT.

=== Secondary immune-mediated thrombocytopaenia ===
Secondary IMT may be the result of viruses, parasites, or bacteria; neoplasia; drug-induced aetiology; blood transfusion; allergic and vaccine reaction which disrupts the homoeostasis of the immune system and results in immune-mediated platelet destruction.

=== Risk factors ===
Bitches are twice as likely as male dogs to be affected. Breeds with documented predispositions are: Cocker Spaniels, miniature and toy Poodles, Old English Sheepdogs, Golden Retrievers, and German Shepherds. Neutered dogs have a significantly increased risk of developing IMT.

=== Age of onset ===
Age of onset has been reported in the literature as ranging from >1–14 years. The median age is reported to be between 4 and 8.1 years.

== Diagnosis ==
Dogs usually present with lethargy, asthaenia, anorexia, or mild pyrexia. Signs of platelet dysfunction such as petechiae or ecchymosis, epistaxis or rhinorrhagia and in severe cases with haematuria; gingival or ocular haemorrhages are used to identify and diagnose thrombocytopaenia. Up to half of dogs may present with splenomegaly.

Patients can be screened to check for drugs and toxins that may cause haemostasis or secondary IMT. PCR serology tests may be performed to screen for diseases. Serum chemistry, coagulation panels, and Coombs tests can be performed to rule out or diagnose comorbidities including: von Willebrand's disease, haemophilia A, disseminated intravascular coagulation, immune-mediated haemolytic anaemia, or renal failure.

Radiographic and ultrasonographic procedures can rule out splenic hemangiosarcoma, mast cell tumours, pancreatitis, infection, endocarditis, and other diseases with similar symptoms. A biopsy of bone marrow can identify platelet production problems. Biopsies of diseased tissue can identify neoplasia through cytological evaluation.

=== Differential diagnosis ===
Primary IMT is idiopathic and is diagnosed after exclusion of secondary IMT and other causes of thrombocytopaenia. Measure of platelet counts are used to diagnose thrombocytopaenia ( >30,0000-50,000/μL). Primary IMT makes up 5-15% of IMT cases.

== Treatment ==
Treatment varies based on whether or not it is primary or secondary IMT; however, all cases require immunosuppression.

=== Immunosuppression ===
Immunosuppressive drugs are the most common treatment with corticosteroids being commonly used. Vincristine and human intravenous immunogoblin have been shown to increase platelet count and improve recovery; however, none of these treatments have been shown to produce better long term survival than corticoseroid treatment. Alternative immunosuppressants may be used in more severe cases such as: azathioprine, cyclophosphamide, leflunomide, danazol, mycophenolate, mofetil, and cyclosporine. Azathioprine is not recommended for cats due to susceptibility to myelosuppressive effects. In patients that do not respond well to immunosuppressive therapy or have constant relapse a splenectomy may be undertaken. Removal of the spleen removes the primary site of clearance of platelets and prevents production of autoantibodies. Survival following splenectomy is unpredictable and lifelong care is often needed.

=== Blood transfusion ===
Blood transfusions are typically used in patients with secondary anaemia rather than isolated thrombocytopaenia as the platelets will likely be destroyed on transfusion. Fluid therapy may be used to correct hypovolaemia and dehydration in cases without anaemia; however, this decreases platelet production.

=== Therapeutic plasma exchange ===
Therapeutic plasma exchange (TPE) is a novel treatment for immune-mediated diseases and little research has been done for the effectiveness of TPE and patients with IMT. TPE requires removing the patient's plasma which contains antibodies and replacing it with fluids such as sodium chloride, frozen plasma, packed red blood cells, and hetastarch. Kopecny et al. found this treatment to be effective in three out of four dogs with IMT who were unresponsive to other treatments. Francey et al. found that dogs treated with TPE for IMT had similar prognosis to those treated differently; however, Francey et al. discussed its safety as a treatment and recommended further research. (Note: This study used a different fluid to Kopecny et al.)

=== Steroids ===
Prednisone and prednisolone are steroids used to suppress immune response to restore platelet levels. Side effects of these include adrenal atrophy, proteinuria and glomerular changes, weight loss, dermatitis, regurgitation, diarrhoea, gastroinestinal ulceration, hyperglycaemia, polyuria, polydipsia, decreased T4 levels, and other side effects. Patients generally start on a higher rate which is tapered off. Tapering is commenced once patients have gone two weeks with a normal platelet count.

== Prognosis ==
Studies have identified short-term survival rates of 74–97% with a recurrence rate of 24–58%. Melaena and high blood urea nitrogen were associated with worse outcomes. Cummings and Rizzo identified a 60% survival rate in cases comorbid with melaena and high blood urea nitrogen. A study following up on 45 dogs identified with IMT after 1 year found a mortality rate of 11.9%. 89.6% of dogs survived to discharge and 31% of those discharged relapsed, with an average of 78 days for dogs with multiple relapses and 149 days for dogs with only one relapse. The longest time between discharge and relapse was over 3 years. Seven dogs experienced relapse more than once and one dog relapsed five times before being euthanised. In dogs with a platelet count below < 30,000 cells/μL there is an increased risk of spontaneous haemorrhage; however, haemorrhage cannot be predicted in dogs with IMT.
