= Kennel cough =

Upper respiratory infection affecting dogs

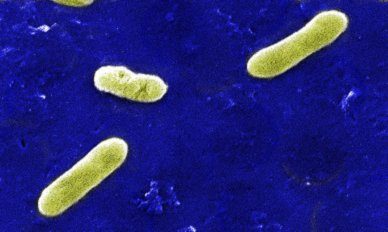
A scanning electron micrograph (SEM) depicting a number of Gram-negative Bordetella bronchiseptica bacteria.

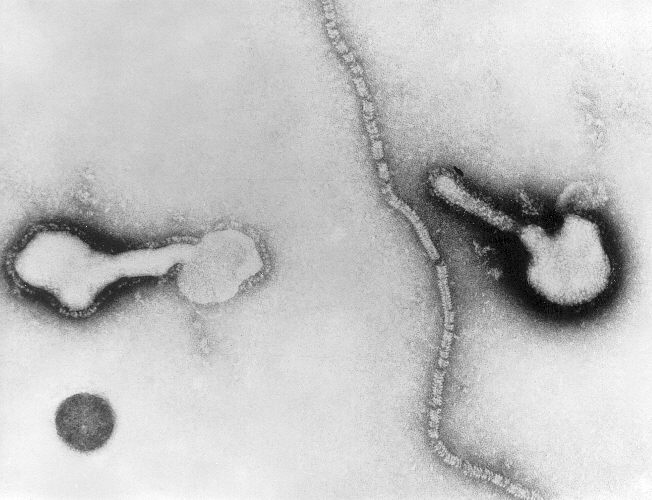
Transmission electron micrograph of parainfluenza virus. Two intact particles and free filamentous nucleocapsid.

Kennel cough (also "canine infectious respiratory disease" (CIRD), "canine infectious respiratory disease complex" (CIRDC) or "canine infectious tracheobronchitis" (CIT)) is an upper respiratory infection affecting dogs. There are multiple causative agents, the most common being the bacterium Bordetella bronchiseptica (found in 78.7% of cases in Southern Germany), followed by canine parainfluenza virus (CPIV; 37.7% of cases), and to a lesser extent canine coronavirus (9.8% of cases). It is highly contagious; however, adult dogs may display immunity to reinfection even under constant exposure. Kennel cough is so named because the infection can spread quickly among dogs in the close quarters of a kennel or animal shelter.

Viral and bacterial causes of canine cough are spread through airborne droplets produced by sneezing and coughing. These agents also spread through contact with contaminated surfaces. Symptoms begin after a several-day incubation period post-exposure, and in most cases will clear up on their own. However, in young puppies or immunocompromised animals, mixed or secondary infections can progress to lower respiratory infections such as pneumonia.

== Symptoms ==
The incubation period is 5–7 days (with a range of 3–10). Symptoms can include a harsh, dry cough, retching, sneezing, snorting, gagging or vomiting in response to light pressing of the trachea or after excitement or exercise. The presence of a fever varies from case to case.

=== Types ===
Although kennel cough is considered to be a multifactorial infection, there are two main forms. The first is more mild and is caused by B. bronchiseptica and canine parainfluenza infections, without complications from canine distemper virus (CDV) or canine mastadenovirus A (formerly canine adenovirus-1). This form occurs most regularly in autumn, and can be distinguished by symptoms such as a retching cough and vomiting. The second form has a more complex combination of causative organisms, including CDV and CAV. It typically occurs in dogs that have not been vaccinated and it is not seasonal. Symptoms are more severe than the first form, and may include rhinitis, conjunctivitis, and fever, in addition to a hacking cough.

== Transmission ==
Viral infections such as canine parainfluenza or Canine respiratory coronavirus are only spread for roughly one week following recovery; however, respiratory infections involving B. bronchiseptica can be transmissible for several weeks longer. While there was early evidence to suggest that B. bronchiseptica could be shed for many months post-infection, a more recent report places detectable nasal and pharyngeal levels of B. bronchiseptica in 45.6% of all clinically healthy dogs. This has potentially expanded the vector from currently or recently infected dogs to half the dog population as carriers. To put the relative levels of shedding bacteria into perspective, a study analyzing the shedding kinetics of B. bronchiseptica presents the highest levels of bacterial shedding one week post-exposure, with an order of magnitude decrease in shedding observed every week. This projection places negligible levels of shedding to be expected six weeks post-exposure (or approximately five weeks post-onset of symptoms). Dogs which had been administered intranasal vaccine four weeks prior to virulent B. bronchiseptica challenge displayed little to no bacterial shedding within three weeks of exposure to the virulent strain.

== Treatment and prevention ==
Antibiotics are given to treat any bacterial infection present. Cough suppressants are used if the cough is not productive. NSAIDs are often given to reduce fever and upper respiratory inflammation. Prevention is by vaccinating for canine adenovirus, distemper, parainfluenza, and Bordetella. In kennels, the best prevention is to keep all the cages disinfected. In some cases, such as "doggie daycares" or nontraditional playcare-type boarding environments, it is usually not a cleaning or disinfecting issue, but rather an airborne issue, as the dogs are in contact with each other's saliva and breath. Although most kennels require proof of vaccination, the vaccination is not a fail-safe preventative. Just like human influenza, even after receiving the vaccination, a dog can still contract mutated strains or less severe cases.

In 2024, reports of a “mysterious” canine respiratory disease was reported on the east coast of the United States that could not be identified as one of the dozen known respiratory diseases. This new organism has caused thousands of dogs to become ill and has been fatal to some. Symptoms include runny eyes, sneezing and coughing but should not be confused with kennel cough.

== Vaccines ==
To increase their effectiveness, vaccines should be administered as soon as possible after a dog enters a high-risk area, such as a shelter. 10 to 14 days are required for partial immunity to develop. Administration of B. bronchiseptica and canine parainfluenza vaccines may then be continued routinely, especially during outbreaks of kennel cough. There are several methods of administration, including parenteral and intranasal. However, the intranasal method has been recommended when exposure is imminent, due to a more rapid and localized protection. Several intranasal vaccines have been developed that contain canine adenovirus in addition to B. bronchiseptica and canine parainfluenza virus antigens. Studies have thus far not been able to determine which formula of vaccination is the most efficient. Adverse effects of vaccinations are mild, but the most common effect observed up to 30 days after administration is nasal discharge. Vaccinations are not always effective. In one study it was found that 43.3% of all dogs in the study population with respiratory disease had in fact been vaccinated.

== Complications ==
Dogs will typically recover from kennel cough within a few weeks. However, secondary infections could lead to complications that could do more harm than the disease itself. Several opportunistic invaders have been recovered from the respiratory tracts of dogs with kennel cough, including Streptococcus, Pasteurella, Pseudomonas, and various coliform bacteria. These bacteria have the potential to cause pneumonia or sepsis, which drastically increase the severity of the disease. These complications are evident in thoracic radiographic examinations. Findings will be mild in animals affected only by kennel cough, while those with complications may have evidence of segmental atelectasis (collapsed lung) and other severe side effects.

== See also ==
- Atypical canine infectious respiratory disease complex
- Bronchitis
- Canine influenza
- Rhinotracheitis
