= Megaesophagus =

- Other names: Esophageal dilatation
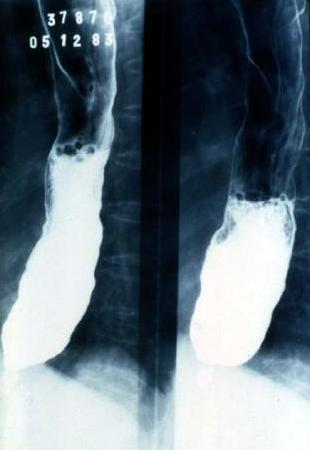
- Chagas megaesophagus
- Specialty: Gastroenterology

Megaesophagus, also known as esophageal dilatation, is a disorder of the esophagus in humans and other mammals, whereby the esophagus becomes abnormally enlarged. Megaesophagus may be caused by any disease which causes the muscles of the esophagus to fail to properly propel food and liquid from the mouth into the stomach (that is, a failure of peristalsis). Food can become lodged in the flaccid esophagus, where it may decay, be regurgitated, or be inhaled into the lungs (leading to aspiration pneumonia).

== Humans ==
Megaesophagus may occur secondary to diseases such as achalasia or Chagas disease. Achalasia is caused by a loss of ganglion cells in the myenteric plexus. There is a marked lack of contraction within the muscles involved in peristalsis with a constant contraction of the lower esophageal sphincter. Dilation of the esophagus results in difficulty swallowing. Retention of food bolus is also noted.

== Other animals ==
=== Dogs ===
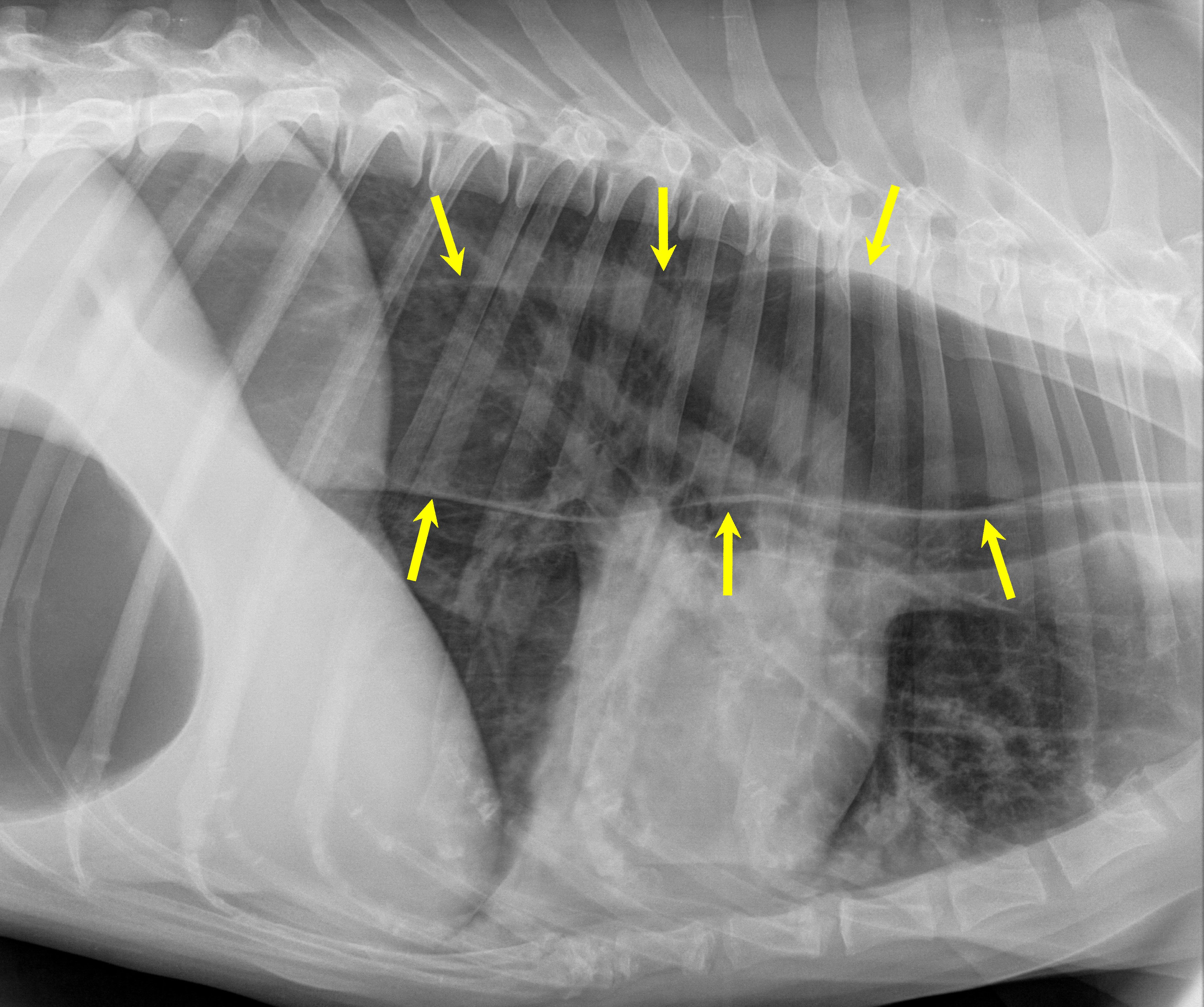
An x-ray of the thorax of a dog with megaoesophagus. The edges of the esophagus are shown by the yellow arrows. (In this image, the head end of the dog is to the right, and the tail end is to the left.)

In dogs, megaesophagus may be congenital or acquired as an adult-onset disorder. Acquired disease is most commonly idiopathic, though it can develop secondary to systemic diseases such as myasthenia gravis, hypoadrenocorticism, polymyositis or hypothyroidism. The cardinal sign is regurgitation; puppies with congenital megaesophagus typically begin to regurgitate at weaning and are often unthrifty and smaller than their littermates, while affected adults also regurgitate and ultimately lose weight. Aspiration pneumonia is a serious complication, with associated signs of cough, fever and sometimes nasal discharge. Management of congenital or acquired idiopathic megaesophagus centers on feeding: frequent, small meals fed from an elevated position with the forelimbs raised, holding that position for 10-15 minutes after eating so gravity assists the passage of food into the stomach. Congenital megaesophagus may resolve as the dog matures, usually by six months of age.

Megaesophagus can also be a symptom of the disease myasthenia gravis. Myasthenia gravis is a neuromuscular disease where the primary symptom is weakness in various body parts of the dog. However, when myasthenia gravis occurs in older dogs it is thought of as an immune-mediated disease. Often when myasthenia gravis is diagnosed in older dogs the first symptom the dog may manifest is megaesophagus.

Myasthenia gravis occurs when acetylcholine receptors (nicotinic acetylcholine receptors) fail to function properly, so that the muscle is not stimulated to contract. There is an invention known as the "bailey chair" that uses the force of gravity to push down liquids and food into the dog's stomach. Usually dogs are known to understand when it is time to eat in their bailey chair, and this helps prevent issues. Bailey chairs can be made and are sold. Also, a simple chair turned upside down can be successfully used for this purpose.

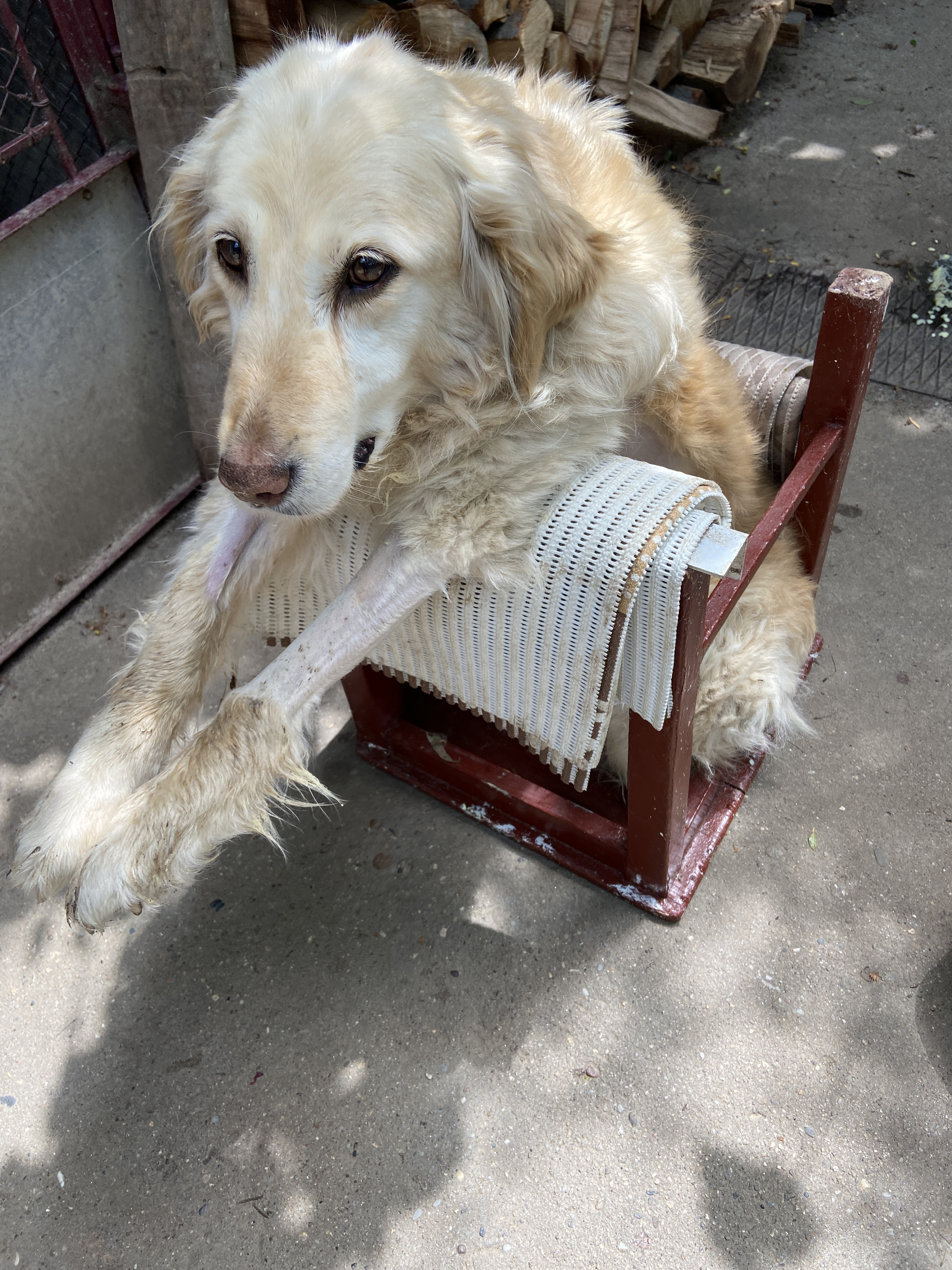
The apparatus for management of the dog's megaesophagus can be simply made from a regular chair turned upside down. Some soft material to protect the back and chest of the dog may be used.

In two unrelated incidents in Latvia and Australia megaesophagus developed in dogs that had eaten certain brands of dog food; however, no agent that could have caused the disorder has been found in lab tests of the food.

==== Diagnosis ====
An important distinction in recognizing megaesophagus is the difference between when a dog regurgitates or vomits. When a dog regurgitates there is usually not as much effort involved as when a dog vomits. Often when regurgitating, the dog will tip its head down and the liquid and/or food will almost appear to "spill out" of its throat.

One of the primary dangers to a dog with megaesophagus is aspiration pneumonia. Because the food stays lodged in the throat, it can often be inhaled into the lungs causing aspiration pneumonia. One way to avoid this is to make sure that every time the dog eats or drinks anything, that the dog sits for at least 10 minutes afterward or is held in a sitting up or begging position. This disorder has a guarded prognosis, however, a successful management technique is vertical feeding in a Bailey chair.

==== Affected breeds ====
- Basset Fauve de Bretagne
- Bernese Mountain Dog
- Bichon Frise
- Boston Terrier
- Chihuahua
- Cocker Spaniel
- Dachshund
- English Springer Spaniel
- French Bulldog
- German Shepherd
- German Spitz
- Golden Retriever
- Great Dane
- Greyhound
- Irish Setter
- Irish Wolfhound
- Italian Greyhound
- Labrador Retriever
- Miniature Schnauzer
- Newfoundland dog
- Rhodesian Ridgeback
- Rottweiler
- Shar Pei
- Shih Tzu
- Welsh Corgi
- Welsh Terrier
- Wire Fox Terrier
- Yorkshire Terrier

=== Cats ===
Affected breeds:

- American Shorthair
- Persian (cat)
- Siamese (cat)

=== Horses ===
Megaesophagus is rare in horses. It is more frequently reported in Friesian horses than in other breeds. Congenital megaesophagus is usually identified when a foal begins to eat solid food from the ground; prior to this, as the foal nurses milk from its mother, the milk passes easily down into the stomach. The most common signs are difficulty swallowing (dysphagia) and inhalational pneumonia.
