= Dog food =

Food intended for consumption by dogs usually made from meat

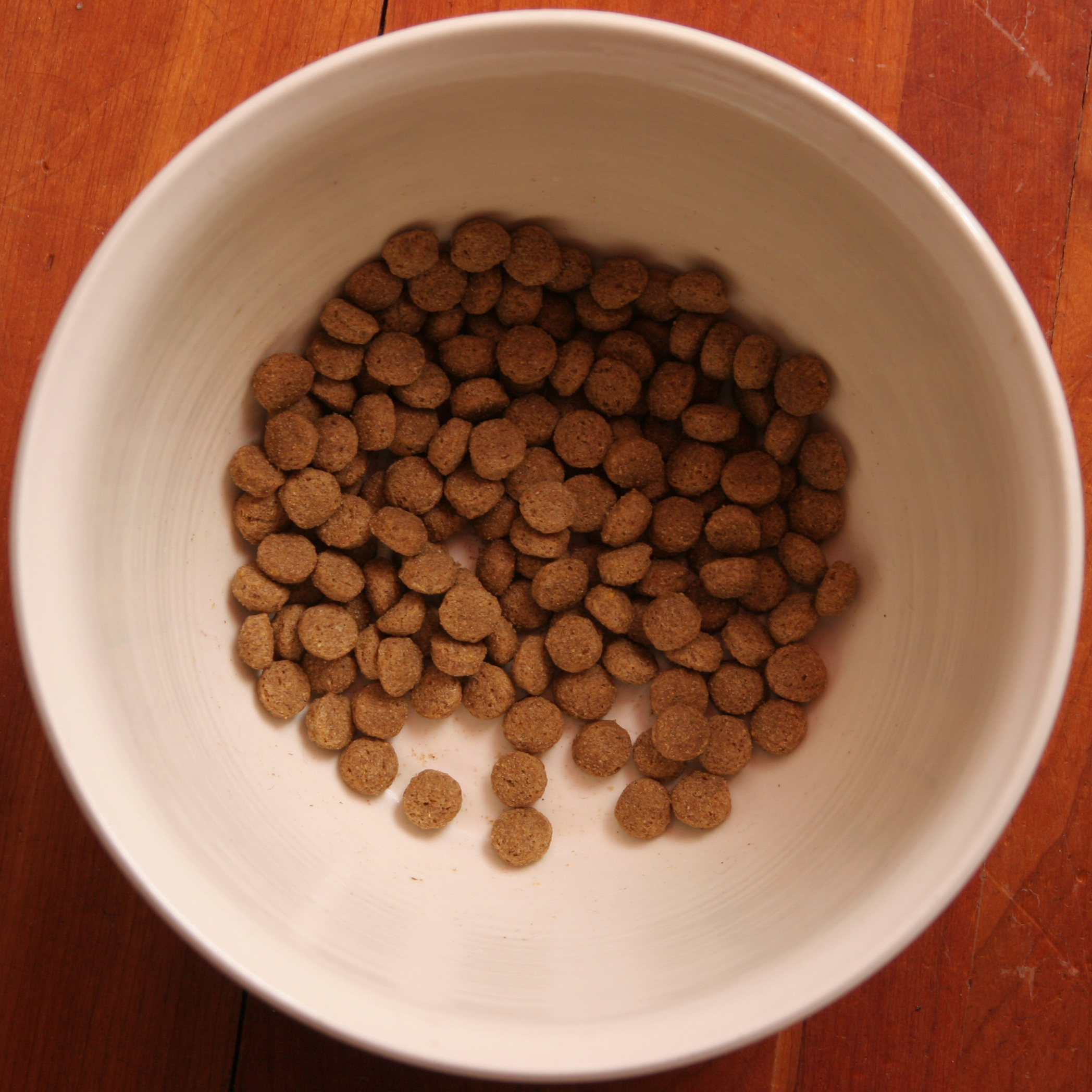
Dry dog food in a bowl

Dog food is specifically formulated food intended for consumption by dogs and other related canines. Dogs are considered to be omnivores with a carnivorous bias. They have the sharp, pointed teeth and shorter gastrointestinal tracts of carnivores, better suited for the consumption of meat than of vegetable substances, yet also have ten genes that are responsible for starch and glucose digestion, as well as the ability to produce amylase, an enzyme that functions to break down carbohydrates into simple sugars – something that obligate carnivores like cats lack. Dogs evolved the ability living alongside humans in agricultural societies, as they managed on scrap leftovers and excrement from humans.

Dogs have managed to adapt over thousands of years to survive on the meat and non-meat scraps and leftovers of human existence and thrive on a variety of foods, with studies suggesting dogs' ability to digest carbohydrates easily may be a key difference between dogs and wolves.

The dog food recommendation should be based on nutrient suitability instead of dog's preferences. Pet owners should consider their dog's breed, size, age, and health condition and choose food that is appropriate for their dog's nutritional needs.

In the United States alone, the dog food market was expected to reach $23.3 billion by 2022.

== History ==
Prior to being domesticated, dogs, being canines, fended for themselves and survived on a carnivorous diet. After adapting them for protection, work, and companionship, people began to care at least in part for their nutritional needs. The historic record of this changing approach dates back at least 2,000 years.

In 37 BCE, Virgil talks about the feeding of dogs in his Bucolics:

Nec tibi cura canum fuerit postrema; sed una Veloces Spartae catulos, acremque Molossum, Pasce sero pingui: "Do not let the care of dogs be last; but the swift Spartan hounds, and fierce Mastiff, Feed the whey"

Around 70 CE, Columella wrote his book On Agriculture in which he addresses the feeding of dogs:

Cibaria fere eadem sunt utrique generi praebenda. Nam si tam laxa rura sunt, ut sustineant pecorum greges, omnis sine discrimine hordeacea farina cum sero commode pascit. Sin autem surculo consitus ager sine pascuo est, farreo vel triticeo pane satiandi sunt, admixto tamen liquore coctae fabae, sed tepido, nam fervens rabiem creat. "Provisions of victuals are almost the same for both [types of dog]. If the fields are so large as to sustain herds of animals, barley meal mixed with whey is a convenient food. But if it is an orchard without grain, spelt or wheat bread is fed mixed with the liquid from cooked beans, but warm, for boiling creates rabies."

In the Avesta, written from 224 to 651 CE, Ahura Mazda advises:

Bring ye unto him milk and fat with meat; this is the right food for the dog.

By Medieval times, dogs were more seen as pets rather than just companions and workers which affected their quality of the diet to include "Besides being fed bran bread, the dogs would also get some of the meat from the hunt. If a dog was sick, he would get better food, such as goat's milk, bean broth, chopped meat, or buttered eggs."

In France, the word pâtée began to appear in the 18th century and referred to a paste originally given to poultry. In 1756, a dictionary indicates it was made of a mixture of bread crumbs and little pieces of meat given to pets.

In 1781, an encyclopedia mentioned an earlier practice of removing the liver, heart, and blood of a downed stag and mixing it with milk, cheese, and bread, and then giving it to dogs.

In 1844, the French writer, Nicolas Boyard, warned against even giving tallow graves (the dregs of the tallow pot) to dogs, though the English favored them (see below), and suggested a meat-flavored soup:

By a misguided economy dogs are given meat scraps and tallow graves; one must avoid this, because these foods make them heavy and sick; give them twice a day a soup of coarse bread made with water, fat and the bottom of the stew pot; put a half-kilogram of bread at least in each soup.

In England, care to give dogs particular food dates at least from the late eighteenth century, when The Sportsman's dictionary (1785) described the best diet for a dog's health in its article "Dog":

A dog is of a very hot nature: he should therefore never be without clean water by him, that he may drink when he is thirsty. In regard to their food, carrion is by no means proper for them. It must hurt their sense of smelling, on which the excellence of these dogs greatly depends. Barley meal, the dross of wheatflour, or both mixed together, with broth or skim'd milk, is very proper food. For change, a small quantity of greaves from which the tallow is pressed by the chandlers, mixed with their flour; or sheep's feet well baked or boiled, are a very good diet, and when you indulge them with flesh it should always be boiled. In the season of hunting your dogs, it is proper to feed them in the evening before, and give them nothing in the morning you take them out, except a little milk. If you stop for your own refreshment in the day, you should also refresh your dogs with a little milk and bread.

In 1833, The Complete Farrier gave similar but far more extensive advice on feeding dogs:

The dog is neither wholly carnivorous nor wholly herbivorous, but of a mixed kind, and can receive nourishment from either flesh or vegetables. A mixture of both is therefore his proper food, but of the former he requires a greater portion, and this portion should be always determined by his bodily exertions.

It was not until the mid-1800s that the world saw its first food made specifically for dogs. An American electrician, James Spratt, concocted the first dog treat. Living in London at the time, he witnessed dogs around a shipyard eating scraps of discarded biscuits. Shortly thereafter he introduced his dog food, made up of wheat meals, vegetables and meat. By 1890 production had begun in the United States and became known as "Spratt's Patent Limited".

In later years, dog biscuit was sometimes treated as synonymous with dog food:

The first three prize winners at the late coursing meeting at Great Bend were trained on Spratt's Patent Dog Biscuit. This same dog food won no less than three awards, including a gold medal, at the Exposition in Paris which has just closed. It would seem that the decision of the judges is more than backed up by the result in the kennel. Another good dog food is that manufactured by Austin & Graves, of Boston. They, too, seem to be meeting with great success in their line.

Canned horse meat was introduced in the United States under the Ken-L Ration brand after World War I as a means to dispose of excess horses no longer needed for the war. The 1930s saw the introduction of canned cat food and dry meat-meal dog food by the Gaines Food Co. By the time World War II ended, pet food sales had reached $200 million. In the 1950s Spratt's became part of General Mills. For companies such as Nabisco, Quaker Oats, and General Foods, pet food represented an opportunity to market by-products as a profitable source of income.

== Physiology ==
Like the other members of the order Carnivora, the dog has a short digestive tract and longer canine teeth, poor ability to synthesise arginine, vitamin D, and α-linolenic acid. Although the dog is a carnivore it has some omnivorous metabolic function such as converting β-carotene to vitamin A, tryptophan to niacin, cysteine to taurine, and linoleic acid to arachidonic acid.

Dogs can synthesise glucose from glucogenic amino acids in the liver and kidney if the dog is unable to obtain adequate starch, glucose, or glycogen.

== Impact and sustainability ==
As of 2018, there are around 470 million pet dogs. Pet food production is responsible for 20–30% of the environmental impacts from animal production. It has been estimated that global greenhouse gas emissions from dog and cat dry food represents around 1.1%−2.9% of global emissions, an amount close to the total emissions of countries such as Mozambique or the Philippines.

Like humans, dogs are omnivores. There is research on alternative protein sources for pet food including insects and algae.

A life-cycle analysis of contemporary pet foods suggests wet foods for cats and dogs tend to have a larger impact than dry foods. It also suggests there are substantial opportunities for improvement in "all phases of the pet food life cycle, including formulation, ingredient selection, manufacturing processes" and so on.

== Commercial varieties ==
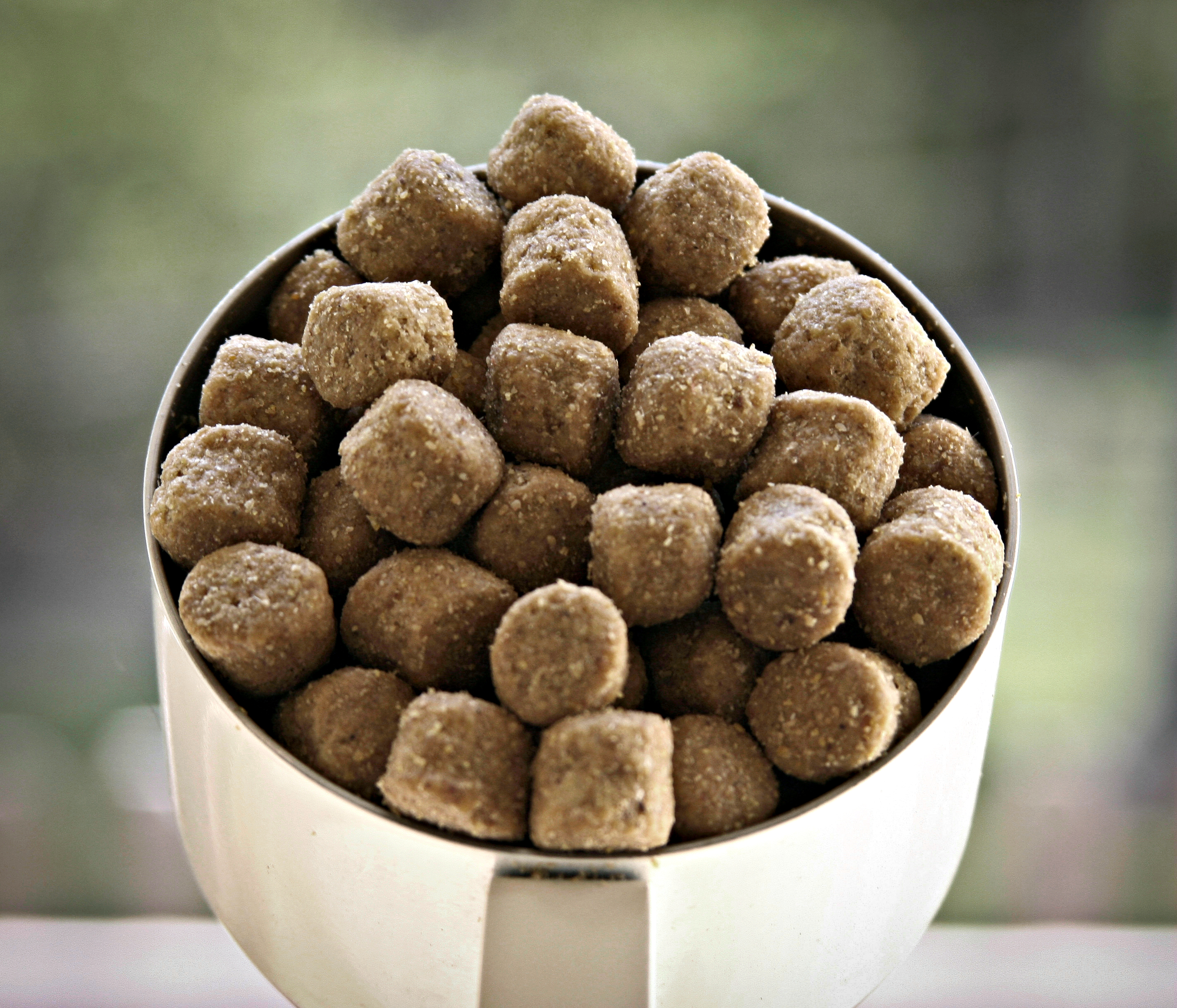
Dog kibble

Most commercially produced dog food is made with animal feed grade ingredients and comes dry in bags (also known in the US as kibble) or wet in cans. Dry food contains 6–10% moisture by volume, as compared to 60–90% in canned food. Semi-moist products typically run 25–35%. Isotopic analysis of dog food in the Brazilian market have found that they are basically made of maize and poultry by-products.

=== Dry ===
Dry dog food usually consists of bagged pellets that contain 3–11% water. It makes up the vast majority of pet foods.

==== Manufacturing process ====
Dry food processing is popular in the pet food industry, as it is an efficient way to supply continuous production of feed in many varieties. It is energy efficient, allows for large amounts of feed to be used, and is cost effective.

To make dog kibble, a process known as extrusion is done. A simple extruder consists of a barrel, helical screws, and a die (tool to cut and shape food). Feed ingredients are solid at room temperature; therefore, the extrusion process of these ingredients requires a temperature above 150 degrees Celsius, achieved by the use of steam, hot water, or other heat sources in order to soften or melt the mixture and allow for fluidity through the barrel. During the extrusion process, the high amounts of pressure applied to the mixture forces it to enter through the die before exiting the extruder completely, where it is cut to its desired size by a rotating fly knife.

Unfortunately, the extrusion process actually denatures some of nutritional elements of the food. Taurine deficiency has been found in dogs and cats fed extruded commercial diets. Not usually considered an essential nutrient for dogs, taurine is plentiful in most whole meats, whether raw or cooked, but is reduced in extruded diets. Taurine deficiency could also be due to the use of rendered, highly processed meat sources that are low in taurine. Regardless of the cause, taurine is now artificially supplemented back into the diet after processing in the production of most commercial pet food.

=== Wet ===
Wet or canned dog food usually is packaged in a solid or soft-sided container. Wet food contains roughly 60–78% water, which is significantly higher in moisture than dry or semi-moist food. Canned food is commercially sterile (cooked during canning); other wet foods may not be sterile. Sterilizing is done through the process of retorting, which involves steam sterilization at 121 degrees Celsius. A given wet food will often be higher in protein or fat compared to a similar dry food on a dry matter basis (a measure which ignores moisture); given the canned food's high moisture content. A larger amount of canned food must be fed in order to meet the dog's required needs. Grain gluten and other protein gels may be used in wet dog food to create artificial meaty chunks, which look like real meat. This food is usually used for old dogs or puppies.

==== Manufacturing process ====
After ingredients are combined, they are placed in a tank at the end of a canning machine. From there, the mixture is forced through an opening and onto a metal sheet, forming a thickness of 8 to 12mm. Next, the mixture is heated to thoroughly cook the ingredients. Heating can be done through the means of ovens, microwaves or steam heating. The sheet containing a layer of feed is passed through the heat source that displays heat to the top and bottom of the tray, allowing the internal temperature to reach 77 degrees Celsius at a minimum. Once cooked, this mixture can be directly placed into cans to form a loaf or it can be cut into "meaty" pieces for chunks and gravy formulas.

=== Semi-moist ===
Semi-moist dog food is packaged in vacuum-sealed pouches or packets. It contains about 20–45% water by weight, making it more expensive per energy calorie than dry food.

Most semi-moist food does not require refrigeration. They are lightly cooked and then quickly sealed in a vacuum package. This type of dog food is extremely vulnerable to spoiling if not kept at a cool temperature and has a shelf life of 2–4 months, unopened.

=== Dehydrated and freeze-dried ===
Dehydrated or freeze-dried meals come in raw and cooked forms. Products are usually air-dried or frozen, then dehydrated (freeze-dried) to reduce moisture to the level where bacterial growths are inhibited. The appearance is very similar to dry dog pellets. The typical feeding methods include adding warm water before serving. There is some concern of nutrients, such as vitamins, being lost during the dehydration process.

Specialty small batches sold through specialty or online stores generally consist of some form of cooked meat, ground bone, pureed vegetables, taurine supplements, and other multivitamin supplements. Some pet owners use human vitamin supplements, and others use vitamin supplements specifically engineered for dogs.

=== Contents ===
Many commercial dog foods are made from materials considered by some authorities and dog owners to be unusable or undesirable. These may include:

- Meat and bone meal
- Offal (wild canines eat offal as a vital part of their diets)
- Animal digest
- Sucrose and/or fructose
- Animal by-products

Less expensive dog foods generally include less meat and more animal by-products and grain fillers. Proponents of a natural diet criticize the use of such ingredients, and point out that regulations allow for packaging that might lead a consumer to believe that they are buying natural food, when, in reality, the food might be composed mostly of ingredients such as those listed above. More expensive dog foods may be made of ingredients suitable for organic products or free range meats. Lamb meal is a popular ingredient.

According to the Association of American Feed Control Officials (AAFCO), animal by-products in pet food may include parts obtained from any animals that have died from sickness or disease, provided they are rendered in accordance to law. Cow brains and spinal cords not allowed for human consumption under federal regulation 21CFR589.2000 due to the possibility of transmission of BSE are allowed to be included in pet food intended for non-ruminant animals. In 2003, the AVMA speculated changes might be made to animal feed regulations to ban materials from "4-D" animals – those who enter the food chain as dead, dying, diseased or disabled.

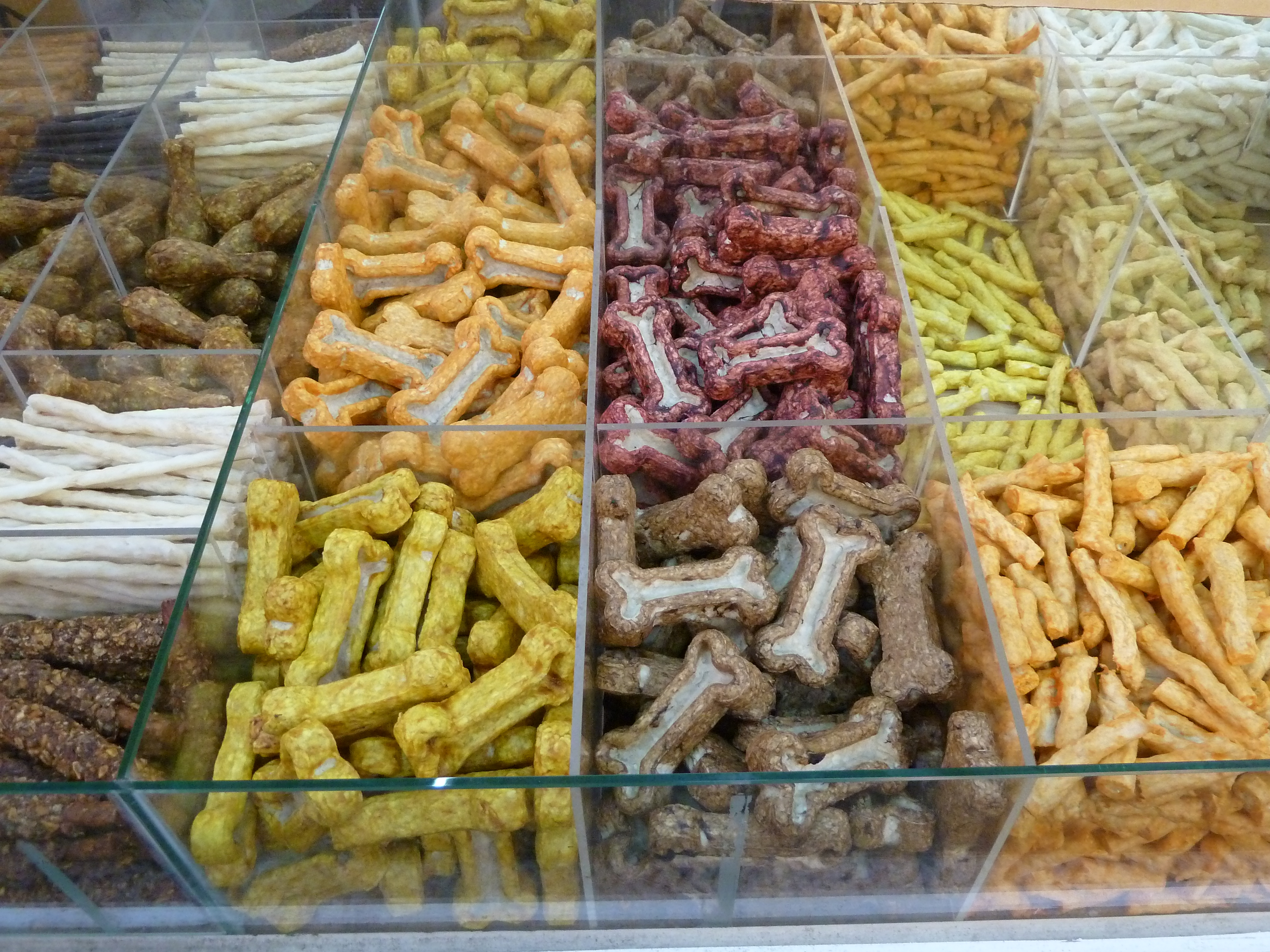
Dog treats are special types of dog food given as a reward, not as a staple food source.

=== Quality, digestibility and energy density ===
There are a few key components to consider when evaluating dietary needs. These factors include the quality and digestibility of the protein provided in the diet, as well as the composition of the amino acids included, and finally the energy density provided in the diet. Diets containing proteins that are high in quality, composition, and digestibility require less of that protein to be present. The same can be said in regards to the energy density. In contrast, high-protein diets will provide excess protein content after meeting maintenance demands; this can therefore lead to the protein being utilized in fat and energy storage. This ultimately increases the risk for developing obesity and other health related issues. Higher protein in the diet helps reduce lean body mass loss, but will not lead to an increase in size of muscle unless paired with resistance exercises or anabolic steroids under maintenance conditions.

=== Labeling ===
In the United States, dog foods labelled as "complete and balanced" must meet standards established by the Association of American Feed Control Officials (AAFCO), either by meeting a nutrient profile or by passing a feeding trial. The Dog Food Nutrient Profiles were last updated in 2016 by the AAFCO's Canine Nutrition Expert Subcommittee.

Critics argue that due to the limitations of the trial and the gaps in knowledge within animal nutrition science, the term "complete and balanced" is inaccurate and even deceptive. An AAFCO panel expert has stated that "although the AAFCO profiles are better than nothing, they provide false securities."

Certain manufacturers label their products with terms such as "premium", "ultra premium", "natural", and "holistic". Such terms currently have no legal definitions and are not regulated. There are also varieties of dog food labeled as "human-grade food." Although no official definition of this term exists, the assumption is that other brands use foods that would not pass US Food and Drug Administration inspection according to the Pure Food and Drug Act or the Meat Inspection Act.

The ingredients on the label must be listed in descending order by weight before cooking. This means before all of the moisture is removed from the meat, fruits, vegetables and other ingredients used.

== Types of diets ==
=== Raw ===
Raw feeding is the practice of feeding domestic dogs, cats and other animals a diet consisting primarily of uncooked meat, edible bones, and organs. The ingredients used to formulate raw diets can vary. Some pet owners choose to make homemade raw diets to feed their animals but commercial raw food diets are also available.

Frozen, or fresh-prepared, meals come in raw or cooked form, some of which is made with ingredients that are inspected, approved, and certified by the USDA for human consumption, but formulated for pets. Part of this growing trend is the commercialization of home-made dog food for pet owners who want the same quality, but do not have the time or expertise to make it themselves. The advantage is forgoing the processing stage that traditional dog food undergoes. This causes less destruction of its nutritional integrity.

The practice of feeding raw diets has raised some concerns due to the risk of foodborne illnesses, zoonosis and nutritional imbalances. People who feed their dogs raw food do so for a multitude of reasons, including but not limited to: culture, beliefs surrounding health, nutrition and what is perceived to be more natural for their pets. Feeding raw food can be perceived as allowing the pet to stay in touch with their wild, carnivorous ancestry. The raw food movement has occurred in parallel to the change in human food trends for more natural and organic products.

=== Senior ===
Aging dogs require specialized catering. Commercially available senior dog diets address their physiological changes through various ingredients and nutrients.

When looking for a senior dog food, one of the first things that should be taken into consideration is the energy content of the diet. The maintenance energy requirements decrease as a dog ages due to the loss in lean body mass that occurs. Therefore, senior dogs will require a diet with a lowered energy content compared to non senior diets. Although senior dogs require lower energy content diets, they will also require diets that are higher in protein and protein digestibility. This is due to the fact that dogs have a reduced ability to synthesize proteins as they age.

Joint and bone health is an important factor to be considered when purchasing a senior dog food. The addition of glucosamine and chondroitin sulfate has been shown to improve cartilage formation, the composition of synovial fluid, as well as improve signs of osteoarthritis. The calcium to phosphorus ratio of senior dog foods is also important. Calcium and phosphorus are considered essential nutrients, according to AAFCO.

Gastrointestinal health is another important factor to consider in the aging dog. Sources of fiber such as beet pulp and flaxseed should be included within senior dog foods to help improve stool quality and prevent constipation. A current technology that is being used to improve gastrointestinal health of aging dogs is the addition of fructooligosaccharides and mannanoligosaccharides. These oligosaccharides are used in combination to improve the beneficial gut bacteria while eliminating the harmful gut bacteria.

The aging dog goes through changes in brain and cognitive health. There are two highly important ingredients that can be included in senior dog foods to help prevent cognitive decline and improve brain health. These ingredients are vitamin E and L-carnitine. Vitamin E acts as an antioxidant, which can prevent oxidative damage that occurs during aging. L-carnitine is used to improve mitochondrial function, which can also help to prevent and lower rates of oxidative damage.

Skin and coat health is important in all dogs, but especially becomes important as dogs age. An important nutrient to look for in senior dog foods to support coat health is linoleic acid, which can be found in corn and soybean oil. Another important nutrient is vitamin A, which helps with keratinization of hair. Good sources of vitamin A for skin and coat health include egg yolk and liver.

Immune system health has been shown to decline in aging dogs. The ratio of omega-6 to omega-3 fatty acids plays an important role in providing optimal health. Vitamin E can be used as an antioxidant in senior dog foods. Pre- and probiotics can also be added to senior dog foods to help improve the beneficial bacteria in the gut, providing support for the immune system.

=== Low-protein ===
According to The Association of American Feed Control Officials (AAFCO) nutrient guideline for cats and dogs, the minimum protein requirement for dogs during adult maintenance is 18% on a dry matter (DM) basis. Other parts of the world would have a guideline similar to AAFCO. The European Pet Food Federation (FEDIAF) also stated a minimum of 18%. AAFCO only provided a minimum, but majority of the diets found on the market contain a protein level exceeding the minimum. Some diets have a protein level lower than others (such as 18–20%). These low-protein diets would not be seen with growth and reproductive life stages because of their higher demand for protein, as such, these diets are for dogs meeting maintenance levels. They can be purchased, such as vegetarian, vegan, weight control, and senior diets. Furthermore, this protein requirement varies from species to species.

==== Disadvantages ====
There is an increasing risk of the practice of coprophagy when providing low-protein diets to dogs; a negative correlation exists between the amount of protein fed and the occurrence of coprophagy. Maintenance needs should still be met by low-protein diets, and the muscle turnover (i.e. synthesis and breakdown) will also remain at an optimal rate, as long as the amino acid intake remains balanced and there are no limiting amino acids. There is a greater opportunity for amino acids to balance in diets containing more protein.

==== Advantages ====
The dog's simple gastrointestinal tract contains a vast array of microbial populations; some members of this very diversified community include Fusobacteriota, Pseudomonadota, and Actinomycetota. The gut microbiota of the dog will be comparable to that of the owners due to similar environmental impacts. Not only are the microbes influenced by the dog's environment, but they are also affected by the macronutrient content of the dog's diet. The populations present and health status of the microbiota found within the gut can alter the physiological and metabolic functions of the dog, which then subsequently affects susceptibility to disease development.

Fermentation and digestion in the hindgut of a dog can potentially be improved depending on the source and the concentration of protein provide in a diet. Greater digestibility due to higher quality ingredients, in addition to lower protein concentrations within a diet, will help promote beneficial outcomes in assisting the health of a dog's gastrointestinal tract. Higher protein entering the gut will lead to more putrefaction that give rise to various toxins including carcinogens and increase the chances of many bowel diseases, such as colorectal cancer.

The age of dogs and cats is inversely proportional to protein consumption. As they age, the protein requirement decreases due to lower level of pepsin in their stomachs. There has also been discussion about higher protein content in diets being inversely related with lifespan (i.e. negative relationship), where lower protein content diets were related to longer lifespans.

=== Hypoallergenic ===
Dogs are prone to have adverse allergic reactions to food similar to human beings. The most common symptoms of food allergies in dogs include rashes, swelling, itchy or tender skin, and gastrointestinal upsets such as uncontrollable bowel movements and soft stools. Certain ingredients in dog food can elicit these allergic reactions. Specifically, the reactions are understood to be initiated by the protein ingredients in dog food, with sources such as beef, chicken, soy, and turkey being common causes of these allergic reactions. A number of "novel protein" dog foods are available that claim to alleviate such allergies in dogs.

Hypoallergenic diets for dogs with food allergies consist of either limited ingredients, novel proteins, or hydrolyzed proteins. Limited ingredients make it possible to identify the suspected allergens causing these allergic reactions, as well as making it easy to avoid multiple ingredients if a canine is allergic to more than one. In novel protein recipes, manufacturers use ingredients which are less likely to cause allergic reactions in dogs such as lamb, fish, and rice. Hydrolyzed proteins do not come from a novel source; they could originate from chicken or soy for example. Hydrolyzed proteins become novel when they are broken apart into unrecognizable versions of themselves, making them novel to allergic gastrointestinal tracts.

=== Grain-free and low-carbohydrate ===
Some dog food products differentiate themselves as grain- or carbohydrate-free to offer the consumer an alternative, claiming carbohydrates in pet foods to be fillers with little or no nutritional value. A study published in Nature suggests that domestic dogs' ability to easily metabolize carbohydrates may be a key difference between wolves and dogs.

Some consumers and manufacturers say dogs perform better on grain-free diets, while some veterinarians doubt this for a lack of scientific evidence. In 2019, a study comparing dry dog food that was manufactured in the United States found that 75% of food containing feed grade grains also contained measurable levels of various mycotoxins (discussed below), while none of the grain-free dry diets tested had any detectable levels of mycotoxins. Feed grade (lower quality grade) grains that are allowed to spoil and become moldy are the suspected source of the mycotoxins. This is the first published study to show a potential health benefit to feeding grain-free commercial dry pet foods.

In 2019, the U.S. Food and Drug Administration identified 16 dog food brands linked to canine heart disease. The FDA has investigated more than 500 cases of dilated cardiomyopathy (DCM) in dogs eating food marketed as grain-free. The 16 brands are: Acana, Zignature, Taste of the Wild, 4Health, Earthborn Holistic, Blue Buffalo, Nature's Domain, Fromm, Merrick, California Natural, Natural Balance, Orijen, Nature's Variety, NutriSource, Nutro, and Rachael Ray Nutrish. These brands are labeled as "grain-free" and list peas, lentils, or potatoes as the main ingredient. The top three brands associated with reports of cardiomyopathy are Acana with 67 reports, Zignature with 64, and Taste of the Wild with 53 reports.

In 2022, the FDA released a follow-up report which superseded the 2019 research. The follow-up report stated the following:

Most of the diets associated with the reports of non-hereditary DCM have legume seed ingredients, also called "pulses" (e.g., peas, lentils, etc.), high in their ingredient lists ... these include both "grain-free" and grain-containing formulations. Legumes, including pulse ingredients, have been used in pet foods for many years, with no evidence to indicate they are inherently dangerous, but analysis of data reported to the Center for Veterinary Medicine indicates that pulse ingredients are used in many "grain-free" diets in greater proportion than in most grain-containing formulas. FDA has asked pet food manufacturers to provide diet formulations so we can further understand the proportions of ingredients in commercially-available diets and possible relationships with non-hereditary DCM. The FDA does not know the specific connection between these diets and cases of non-hereditary DCM and is continuing to explore the role of genetics, underlying medical conditions, and/or other factors.

=== Vegetarian and vegan ===
Like the human practice of veganism, vegan dog foods are those formulated with the exclusion of ingredients that contain or were processed with any part of an animal, or any animal byproduct. A 2023 systematic review found no evidence of serious impacts on animal health from vegetarian cat and dog diets; however, the authors noted that the studies suffered from issues such as selection bias, low sample size, and short feeding periods and recommended further research. The omnivorous domestic canine has evolved to metabolize carbohydrates and thrive on a diet lower in protein, and a vegan diet may be adequate if properly formulated and balanced.

Popularity of this diet has grown with a corresponding increase in people practicing vegetarianism and veganism as well as with growing concerns about environmental issues such as climate change or awareness of the large environmental impacts of animal agriculture. Vegetarian dog foods are produced to either assuage a pet owner's ethical concerns or for animals with extreme allergies.

Due to the exclusion of animal products and by-products, which are primary ingredients of conventional dog food, many nutrients that would otherwise be provided by animal products need to be provided by replacement, plant-based ingredients. While both animal and plant products offer a wide range of macro and micronutrients, strategic formulation of plant ingredients should be considered to meet nutritional requirements, as different nutrients are more abundant in different plant sources. Despite the large differences in ingredient sourcing, studies have demonstrated that a plant-based diet can be just as edible and palatable as animal-based diets for dogs. There are now various commercial vegetarian and vegan diets available on the market.

Special considerations

Some nutrients that require special consideration include protein, calcium, vitamin D, vitamin B12, taurine, L-carnitine, and omega-3 fatty acids, particularly DHA and EPA. Although their sources are more limited without animal products, it is possible to formulate a diet adequate in these nutrients through plant and synthetic sources. A review recommends a cautious approach to vegan dog food given "the lack of large population-based studies" as of 2023 and that commercial foods are used if guardians wish to implement a vegan diet.

Potential risks in feeding a plant-based diet include alkaline urine and nutrient inadequacy, especially in homemade diets. Adherence to recommendations by reliable sources is strongly advised.

β-mannanase supplementation may aid crude protein digestion in dogs fed a diet high in plant protein.

=== Sport ===
High performance sport dogs are those bred and trained to compete in various athletic events. Events include but are not limited to, agility trials, hunting and racing. These events are physically and metabolically demanding. As a result, canine athletes require specialized nutrition in order to perform at high levels during events and for maintenance and recovery. The main nutritional concern for sport dogs is adequate energy. A well-balanced diet, containing the appropriate amounts of protein, fat, carbohydrate, fiber and micronutrients is essential to meet these energy requirements.

== Nutrients and supplements ==
The requirements and functions of nutrients in dogs are largely similar to those in cats, with many requirements relaxed:

- The requirement of arginine in the urea cycle is reduced, as dogs have a functional pyrroline-5-carboxylate synthase.
- Dogs have a functional delta 6 desaturase, hence no specific need for arachidonic acid.
- Dogs have a functional sulfinoalanine decarboxylase and can synthesise taurine from methionine and cysteine; however, some breeds have a genetic predisposition to taurine deficiency. Taurine supplementation is recommended for dogs at risk of taurine deficiency and dogs with dilated cardiomyopathy.
- Unlike cats, dogs and humans can use Vitamin D2 nearly as efficiently as they use Vitamin D3.

=== Chart ===
Association of American Feed Control Officials (AAFCO) Dog Food Nutrient Profiles, (Note: Presumes an energy density of 4.0 kcal/g ME, based on the modified Atwater values of 3.5, 8.5, and 3.5 kcal/g for protein, fat, and carbohydrate (nitrogen-free extract, NFE), respectively [Regulation PF9]. Rations greater than 4.5 kcal/g should be corrected for energy density; rations less than 4.0 kcal/g should not be corrected for energy.) 2014 with Role of Vitamins & Minerals
Nutrient	Units (dry matter basis)	Growth and reproduction minimum	Adult maintenance minimum (Note: Recommended concentrations for maintenance of body weight at an average caloric intake for dogs of a given optimal weight.)	Maximum	Functions	Signs of deficiency/Excess
Protein and amino acids
Total protein	%	22.5	18.0			
Arginine	%	1.0	0.51			Deficiency; Hyperammonemia; Symptoms include lethargy, vomiting, ataxia, hyperesthesia and can be serious enough to induce death and coma
Histidine	%	0.44	0.19			
Isoleucine	%	0.71	0.38			
Leucine	%	1.29	0.68			
Lysine	%	0.90	0.63			
Methionine + cystine	%	0.70	0.65			
Methionine	%	0.35	0.33			
Phenylalanine + tyrosine	%	1.30	0.74			
Phenylalanine	%	0.83	0.45			
Threonine	%	1.04	0.48			
Tryptophan	%	0.20	0.16			
Valine	%	0.68	0.49			
Fats
Total fats (Note: Although a true requirement for fat per se has not been established, the minimum level was based on recognition of fat as a source of essential fatty acids, as a carrier of fat-soluble vitamins, to enhance palatability, and to supply an adequate caloric density.)	%	8.5	5.5			
Linoleic acid	%	1.3	1.1			
alpha-Linolenic acid	%	0.08	ND			
EPA + DHA	%	0.05	ND			
ω-6:ω-3 ratio				30:1		
Minerals
Calcium	%	1.2	0.5	1.8	Formation of bones and teeth; Blood coagulation; Nerve impulse transmission; Muscle contraction; Cell signaling	Deficiency; Nutritional secondary hyperparathyroidism; loss of bone mineral content, which can lead to collapse and curvature of lumbar vertebrae and pelvic bones; bone pain, which can progress to pathological fractures; Excess; Depressed food intake; Decreased growth; Increased bone mineral density; Increased need for magnesium
Phosphorus	%	1.0	0.4	1.6	Skeletal structure; DNA and RNA structure; Energy metabolism; Locomotion; Acid-base balance	Deficiency; Hemolytic anemia; Locomotor disturbances; Metabolic acidosis
Ca:P ratio		1:1	1:1	2:1		
Potassium	%	0.6	0.6		Acid-base balance; Nerve-impulse transmission; Enzymatic reactions; Transport functions	Deficiency; Anorexia; Retarded growth; Neurological disorders, including ataxia and severe muscle weakness
Sodium	%	0.3	0.08		Acid-base balance; Regulation of osmotic pressure; Nerve impulse generation and transmission	Deficiency; Anorexia; Impaired growth; Excessive thirst and drinking; Excessive urination
Chloride	%	0.45	0.12		Acid-base balance; Osmolarity of extracellular fluids	Deficiency; Increased sodium concentration in renal fluid; Excess potassium excretion
Magnesium	%	0.06	0.06		Enzyme functions; Muscle and nerve-cell membrane stability; Hormone secretion and function; Mineral structure of bones and teeth	Deficiency; Poor growth; Overextension of the carpal joints; Muscle twitching; Convulsions; Excess; Urinary tract stone formation in the presence of high pH
Iron (Note: Average apparent digestibility for iron associated with recommended minimums is 20% of that consumed. Because of very poor bioavailability, iron from carbonate or oxide sources that are added to the diet should not be considered as components in meeting the minimum nutrient level.)	mg/kg	88	40		Hemoglobin and myoglobin synthesis; Energy metabolism	Deficiency; Poor growth; Pale mucous membranes; Lethargy; Weakness; Diarrhea; Excess; Vomiting and diarrhea
Copper (Note: Because of very poor bioavailability, copper from oxide sources that are added to the diet should not be considered as components in meeting the minimum nutrient level.)	mg/kg	12.4	7.3		Connective tissue formation; Iron metabolism; Blood cell formation; Melanin pigment formation; Myelin formation; Defense against oxidative damage	Deficiency; Reduced weight gain; Longer time to conceive
Manganese	mg/kg	7.2	5.0		Enzyme functions; Bone development; Neurological function	No studies of deficiency in cats
Zinc	mg/kg	100	80	1000 (removed in 2014)	Enzyme reactions; Cell replication; Protein and carbohydrate metabolism; Skin function; Wound healing	Deficiency; Skin lesions; Growth retardation; Testicular damage
Iodine	mg/kg	1.0	1.0	11	Thyroid hormone synthesis; Cell differentiation; Growth and development of puppies; Regulation of metabolic rate	Deficiency; Enlargement of thyroid glands; Excess; Excessive tearing, salivation, and nasal discharge; Dandruff
Selenium	mg/kg	0.35	0.35	2	Defense against oxidative damage; Immune response	No studies of deficiency in cats
Vitamins
Vitamin A	IU/kg	5000	5000	250,000	Vision; Growth; Immune function; Fetal development; Cellular differentiation; Transmembrane protein transfer	Deficiency; Conjunctivitis; Cataracts, retinal degeneration, and other eye problems; Weight loss; Muscle weakness; Reproductive and developmental disorders; Excess; Skeletal lesions in kittens, particularly outgrowths of the cervical vertebrae; Osteoporosis
Vitamin D	IU/kg	500	500	3,000	Maintenance of mineral status; Skeletal structure; Muscle contraction; Blood clotting; Nerve conduction; Cell signaling; Phosphorus balance	Deficiency; Rickets; Abnormalities in skeletal development; Progressive paralysis; Ataxia; Lack of grooming; Reduction in body weight and food intake; Excess; Anorexia; Vomiting; Lethargy; Calcification of soft tissues
Vitamin E (Note: It is recommended that the ratio of IU of vitamin E to grams of polyunsaturated fatty acids (PUFA) be >0.6:1. A diet containing 50 IU of vitamin E will have a ratio of >0.6:1 when the PUFA content is 83 grams or less. Diets containing more than 83 grams of PUFA should contain an additional 0.6 IU of vitamin E for every gram of PUFA.)	IU/kg	50	50		Defense against oxidative damage via free radical scavenging	Deficiency; Anorexia; Depression; Pain sensitivity in abdomen; Fat tissue pathology
Vitamin B1 / Thiamine (Note: Because processing may destroy up to 90% of the thiamine in the diet, allowance in formulation should be made to ensure the minimum nutrient level is met after processing.)	mg/kg	2.25	2.25		Energy and carbohydrate metabolism; Activation of ion channels in neural tissue	Deficiency; Neurological impairments including altered reflexes and convulsive seizures; Heart-rate disorders; Pathological changes in the central nervous system; Severe learning deficits
Riboflavin	mg/kg	5.2	5.2		Enzyme functions	Deficiency; Cataracts; Fatty livers; Testicular atrophy
Pantothenic acid	mg/kg	12	12		Energy metabolism	Deficiency; Stunted growth; Fatty changes in liver; Small bowel lesions
Niacin	mg/kg	13.6	13.6		Enzyme functions	Deficiency; Anorexia; Weight loss; Elevated body temperature; Fiery red tongue, with ulceration and congestion
Vitamin B6 / Pyridoxine	mg/kg	1.5	1.5		Glucose generation; Red blood cell function; Niacin synthesis; Nervous system function; Immune response; Hormone regulation; Gene activation	Deficiency; Stunted growth; Convulsive seizures; Kidney lesions
Folic Acid	mg/kg	0.216	0.216		Amino acid and nucleotide metabolism; Mitochondrial protein synthesis	Deficiency; Decreased growth rate; increased iron levels in blood
Vitamin B12	mg/kg	0.028	0.028		Enzyme functions	Deficiency; Weight loss; Vomiting; Diarrhea; Intestinal disorders
Choline	mg/kg	1360	1360			Deficiency; Fatty liver in kittens; Lower motivation to eat in kittens; Decreased growth rate in kittens

The European Union does not use a unified nutrient requirement. A manufacturer committee called FEDIAF (European Pet Food Industry Federation) makes recommendations for cats and dogs that members follow. Both AAFCO and FEDIAF publish in two formats: one in the amount-per-kilogram form above, another in an energy-ratio format.

== Dangers ==
A number of common human foods and household ingestibles are toxic to dogs, including chocolate solids (theobromine poisoning), onion and garlic (thiosulfate, alliin or allyl propyl disulfide poisoning), grapes and raisins (cause kidney failure in dogs), milk (some dogs are lactose intolerant and suffer diarrhea; goats' milk can be beneficial to dogs), mushrooms, fatty foods, rhubarb, xylitol, macadamia nuts, as well as various plants and other potentially ingested materials. A full list of poison/toxic substances can be found on the ASPCA's website.

=== Recalls ===
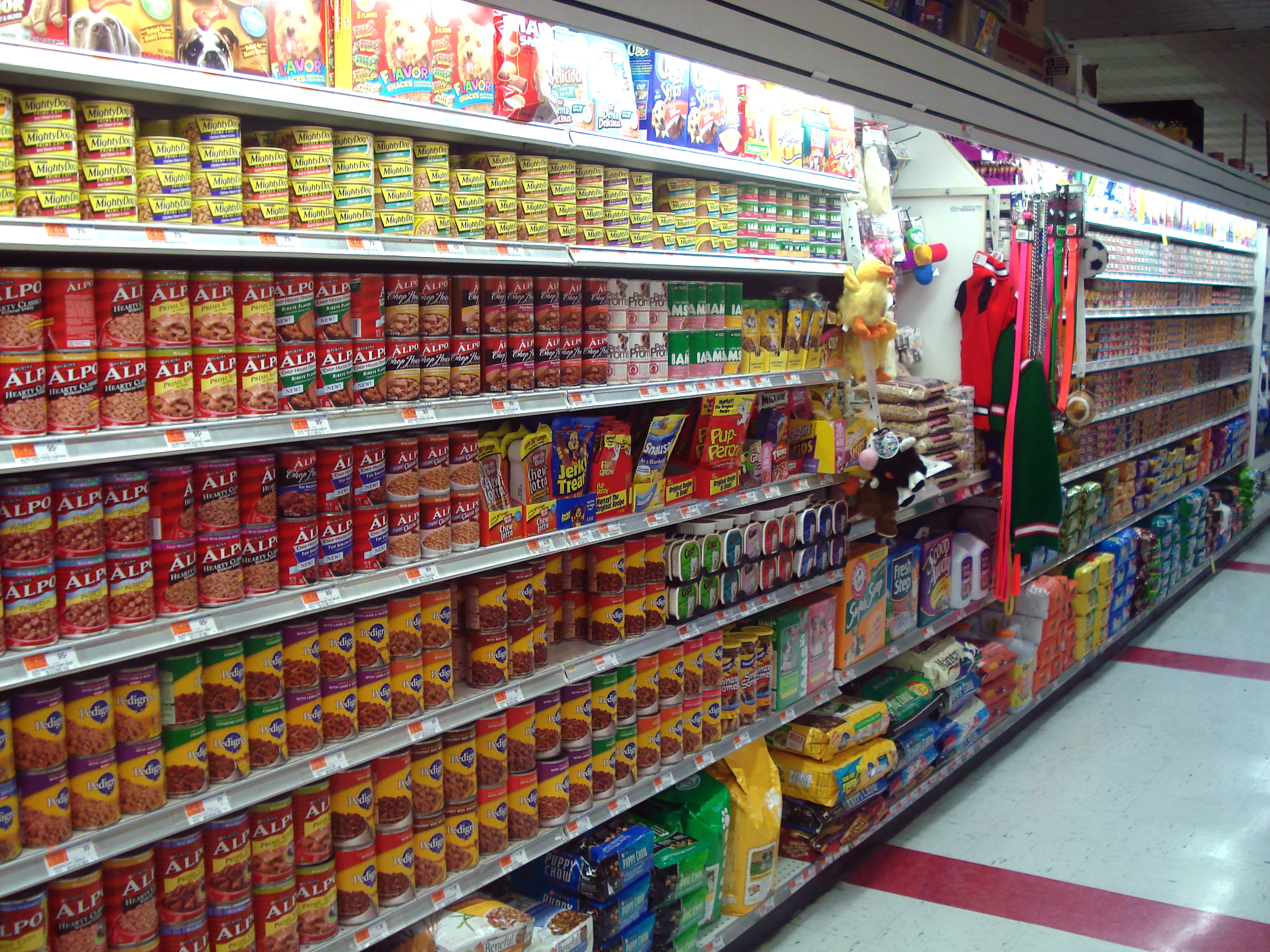
Dog food at a supermarket in Brooklyn, New York

The 2007 pet food recalls involved the massive recall of many brands of cat and dog foods beginning in March 2007. The recalls came in response to reports of renal failure in pets consuming mostly wet pet foods made with wheat gluten from a single Chinese company, beginning in February 2007. After more than three weeks of complaints from consumers, the recall began voluntarily with the Canadian company Menu Foods on March 16, 2007, when a company test showed sickness and death in some of the test animals.

Overall, several major companies recalled more than 100 brands of pet foods, with most of the recalled product coming from Menu Foods. The contaminant was identified as melamine, which had been added as an adulterant to simulate a higher protein content.

In the United States, there has been extensive media coverage of the recall. There have been calls for government regulation of pet foods, which had previously been self-regulated by pet food manufacturers. The economic impact on the pet food market has been extensive, with Menu Foods losing roughly $30 million alone from the recall.

=== Contaminants ===
==== Mycotoxins ====
In April 2014, aflatoxin B1, a known carcinogenic toxin, melamine, and cyanuric acid were all found in various brands of USA pet food imported into Hong Kong. Since 1993, the FDA has confirmed concerns of toxins in feed grade (animal grade) ingredients, yet to date no comprehensive federal regulation exists on mycotoxin testing in feed grade (animal grade) ingredients used to make pet food.

In 1997, the Journal of Food Additives and Contaminants established that low levels of various mycotoxins could cause health concerns in pets, and was found in feed grade ingredients.

A study published in the Journal of Food Protection in 2001 cited concerns regarding fungi (the source of mycotoxins) in commercial pet foods and warned about the "risk for animal health".

In 2006, a study published in the Journal of Agricultural and Food Chemistry confirmed mycotoxins in pet foods around the world and concluded that contamination of mycotoxins in pet foods can lead to chronic effects on the health of pets.

In 2007, the International Journal of Food Microbiology published a study that claimed "mycotoxin contamination in pet food poses a serious health threat to pets", and listed them: aflatoxins, ochratoxins, trichothecenes, zearalenone, fumonisins and fusaric acid.

A 2008 study published in the Journal of Animal Physiology and Animal Nutrition found high levels of mycotoxins in the raw ingredients used for pet food in Brazil.

A 2010 study in the Journal of Mycotoxin Research tested 26 commercial dog foods and found mycotoxins at concerning sub-lethal levels. It was determined that long-term exposure to low levels of confirmed mycotoxins could pose chronic health risks.

For all the above reasons, a trend away from feed ingredients and toward USDA-certified ingredients fit for human consumption has developed.

In 1999, another fungal toxin triggered the recall of dry dog food made by Doane Pet Care at one of its plants, including Ol' Roy, Wal-Mart's brand, as well as 53 other brands. This time the toxin killed 25 dogs.

A 2005 consumer alert was released for contaminated Diamond Pet Foods for dogs and cats. Over 100 canine deaths and at least one feline fatality have been linked to Diamond Pet Foods contaminated by potentially deadly aflatoxin, according to Cornell University veterinarians.

==== Salmonella and copper ====
The FDA released a video focusing on another major threat in commercial pet food: Salmonella bacterial contamination. They also cite other major toxins of concern. The video references the case of a specific commercial pet food plant that was also the subject of a March 2014 study published in the Journal of the American Veterinary Medical Association. It details how at least 53 known human illnesses were linked to commercial pet foods made at that plant in 2012. A class action lawsuit linked to this outbreak was settled in 2014.

The video also cites the dangers of over supplementation of nutrients in pet food. A study published in the Journal of the American Veterinary Medical Association in February 2013 suggested a correlation between liver disease and the amount of copper supplementation in AAFCO diets.

== In popular culture ==
Eating your own dog food or dogfooding is the practice of using your own products or services.

== See also ==
- Cat food
- Dental health diets for dogs
- Dog food brands
- Dog biscuits
- Dog meat
- Dog odor
- Hypoallergenic dog food
- Pet store
- Puppy nutrition
- Senior dog diet
