= Cereal food fines =

Cereal Food Fines are a byproduct or left-over of breakfast cereal food processing. Usually the source is unknown and sometimes this product is used in low quality dog food. The quality is unknown and fines may contain artificial sweeteners or other additives. A patent definition states that they "often will contain a significant quantity of sugar. Generally, the total sugar content of the deformable core will be in the range of about 15% to about 27%, preferably about 18% to about 20%"

AAFCO defines cereal food fines as "particles of breakfast cereals obtained as a byproduct of their processing."

== See also ==
- Distillers grains

== Sources ==
US 4777058, Changler, Ronald G & Crosby, Kent D, "Composite animal food", published 11 Oct 1988, assigned to Star-Kist Foods, Inc
