= Senior dog diet =

Pet foods catered toward senior pets

Senior dog food diets are pet foods that are catered toward the senior or mature pet population. The senior dog population consists of dogs that are over the age of seven for most dog breeds, though in general large and giant breed dogs tend to reach this life stage earlier when compared to smaller breed dogs. Senior dog foods contain nutrients and characteristics that are used to improve the health of the aging dog. Aging in dogs causes many changes to occur physiologically that will require a change in nutrient composition of their diet.

A major change that occurs is the decrease in energy requirements which is addressed by lowered caloric content of senior pet foods. Although energy requirements decrease, protein requirements increase as the dog ages. Senior dog foods include a higher protein content as well as highly digestible protein sources to deal with this. Nutrients included for joint and bone health include glucosamine, chondroitin, omega-3 fatty acids as well as two main minerals; calcium and phosphorus. Sources of fiber included in senior dog foods include beet pulp and flax seed as well as fructooligosaccharides (FOS) and mannanoligosaccharides (MOS). These act to increase gastrointestinal health.

Brain and cognitive health decline as the dog ages which leads to the inclusion of vitamin E and L-carnitine in senior dog diets to combat this decline. Skin and coat health can also decline in older dogs due to various reasons. The inclusion of linoleic acid as well as vitamin A into senior dog diets helps to improve or maintain the skin and coat of senior dogs. Immune system health is important to maintain in older dogs to prevent the development of various diseases. By including omega-3 and omega-6 fatty acids, vitamin E, β-carotene as well as pre- and pro-biotics, the immune system can be boosted and maintained to help improve overall health.

== Energy demand ==
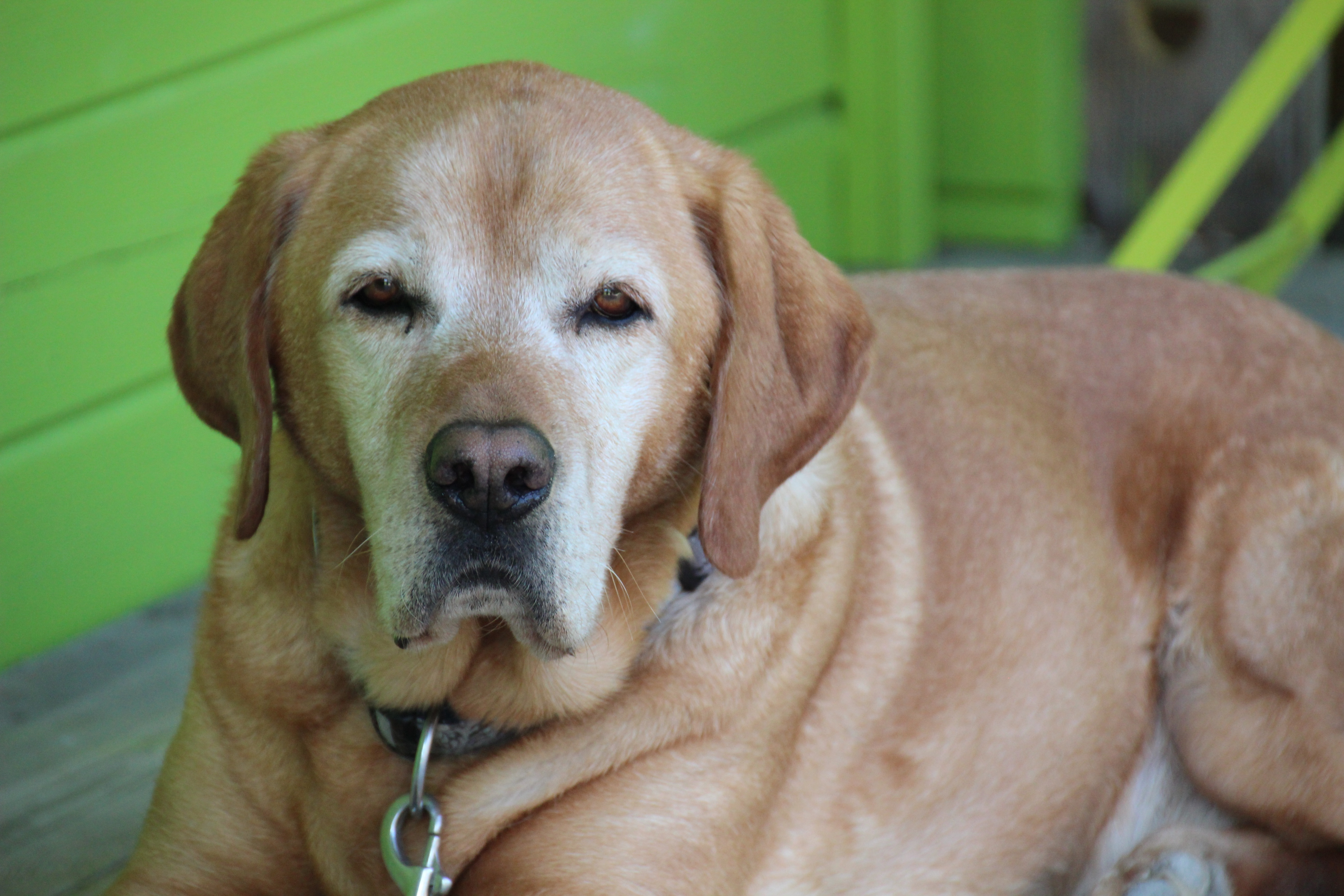
2 senior dogs

The maintenance energy requirement (MER), or the energy that is required to maintain normal activity,

decreases significantly as a result of lean body mass loss in aging dogs. The MER can decrease by up to 25% as dogs age due to this loss. Basal metabolic rate is maintained by lean mass energy expenditure, which accounts for 96% of the function of lean mass. The metabolizable energy, or the amount of available energy which is left after the losses in urine, feces and combustible gas is subtracted, can be found on the food bag or calculated using the modified Atwater equation:

ME (kcal/kg) = 10[(3.5 x Crude Protein) + (8.5 x Crude Fiber) + (3.5 x Nitrogen Free Extract)]

This equation takes into consideration the amount of energy availability from crude protein, crude fiber, and the nitrogen free extract from pet foods in order to calculate the amount of energy the animal is receiving from the food.

It is important to consider the metabolizable energy content of senior or mature pet foods using this equation, as energy requirements will vary with age.

== Protein ==
A dog's requirements for protein increases as a result of a reduced ability to synthesize proteins as it ages. As a result, it is extremely important to not restrict protein consumption to a senior dog as it can be as just as harmful as protein deficiency in young dogs.

To ensure good health, it is important to provide dogs with the 22 amino acids which they require. Of these 22 amino acids, 12 can be synthesized. The rest must be provided by good sources of dietary protein in adequate quantities. Good sources of protein include eggs and fish, which have a high biological value. This value describes the percentage of usable amino acids within the protein. It has been recommended that a minimum of 2.55 grams of protein per kilogram of body weight should be fed daily to ensure that protein requirements are met.

It is important to understand that protein requirements based on weight are variable and that many factors influence the protein requirements of each senior dog.

== Bone and joint health ==
Joint deterioration occurs as dogs age. As their joints become less lubricated there is increased friction between the bone and the cartilage. With this increased friction, the cartilage deteriorates and wears away. The reduction of this cushion in the joints causes bone-on-bone contact to occur, causing the animal great discomfort. This can cause various related issues such as altered gaits and changes in activity levels resulting in a greater possibility of obesity and other conditions related to mobility and activity levels.

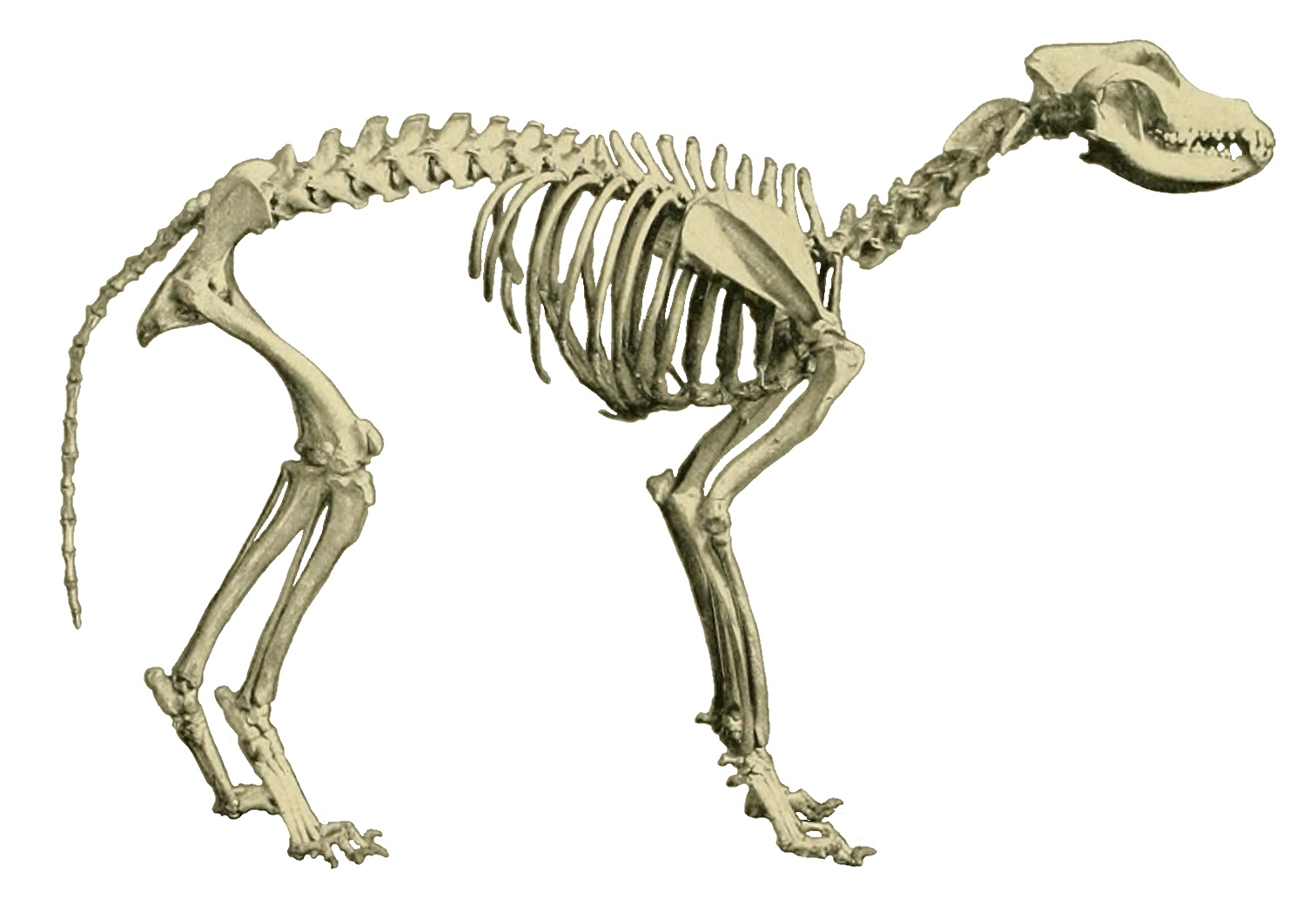
Joint and bone health deteriorate as dogs age.

There has been research done in human medicine that indicates the positive effect that a combination of chondroitin sulphate and glucosamine can have on moderate-to-severe knee pain. This effect is likely very similar to the effect these two ingredients have on the joints of aging dogs. The effects of these supplements is not instant, and the aforementioned studies showed approximately a 3-month period between the beginning of supplementation and the reduction of symptoms.

=== Glucosamine ===
Glucosamine is a building block for the synthesis of cartilage tissue. It is found naturally in the body, mainly in the fluid which surrounds the joints. This can help aging joints by maintaining the cartilage, thus reducing the pain caused by bone-on-bone contact within the joint (this is the primary source of joint pain in aging animals). This will increase the mobility of the dog which is vital for the maintenance of a healthy weight and general body function. There have also been some studies which have shown anti-inflammatory properties of glucosamine which would also help joint function in aging dogs. Glucosamine is usually provided in supplements in the form of glucosamine sulfate, or by the inclusion of chicken meal in the diet, as it contains glucosamine as well as chondroitin.

=== Chondroitin ===
Chondroitin is a major component in the composition of cartilage. It helps the cartilage retain moisture, lubricating the joint and allowing ease of movement of the bone across the cartilage. This reduces the damage to the cartilage over time. Chondroitin is produced naturally in the boy but older dogs can often benefit from a supplemental dose of chondroitin. Chondroitin is commonly supplied as a supplement in the form of chondroitin sulfate.

=== Omega-3 fatty acids ===
Omega-3 fatty acids include docosahexaenoic acid (DHA) and eicosapentaenoic acid (EPA). These two fatty acids have been shown to improve gait score and lameness in dogs with osteoarthritis. Omega-3 fatty acids have also been shown to have noticeable anti-inflammatory properties. It is for this reason, among other benefits, that they are routinely included at supplemental levels in senior dog diets. A good source of omega-3 fatty acids in dog foods include fish oils and other fish sources (especially salmon and herring) as well as flaxseed.

=== Calcium and phosphorus ===
One of the most basic requirements of the aging dog's body is the requirement for maintenance of their bones. In order for the bones to be able to heal from any injury or erosion, as well as maintain their strength to avoid these problem, they need a ready supply of calcium and phosphorus. Both of these are essential nutrients according to AAFCO guidelines, and should be included in a senior dog diet. Calcium and Phosphorus are also very valuable in the maintenance tooth health of dogs. In order for calcium to be properly absorbed into the body dogs will require another nutrient, vitamin D. adequate vitamin D is needed to form enough calcitriol, known as the active form of vitamin D. If enough is not present the body will begin to draw from stores of vitamin D within the body like the bones and teeth for its needs. This can lead to bone weakening and the inability to repair bone damage.

== Gastrointestinal health ==
=== Sources of Fiber ===
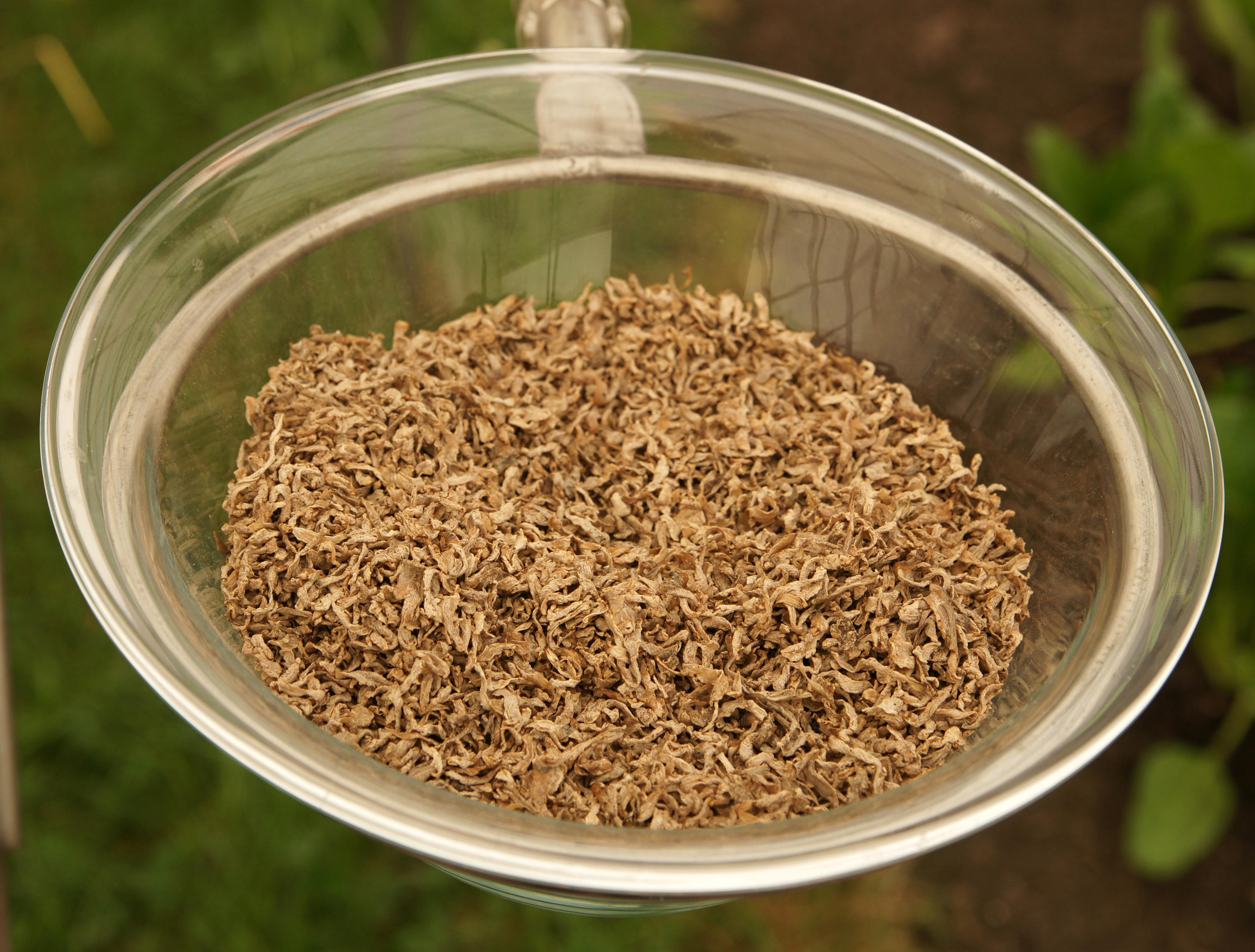
Beet pulp is a good source of insoluble fiber.

==== Beet pulp ====
Beet pulp is a common ingredient in dog diets as it is a very versatile and useful fiber source. Beet pulp provides fiber to the diet which acts as a stool hardener and aids in lower tract "cleansing". The composition of beet pulp is such that it is an insoluble and moderately fermentable fiber. This means it can add bulk to the diet as well as moisture to the stool while also supplying the animal's cells lining the intestine with energy due to the moderate fermentation that occurs.

==== Flax seed ====
Flax seed is the whole seed of the flax plant which contains both soluble and insoluble fiber. The insoluble fraction includes cellulose, hemicellulose, and lignin. These components have a very good water binding capacity which aids in adding bulk into the diet of the dog. This has varying benefits for dogs depending on their lifestyle. In some dogs, it aids in digestion by preventing constipation, in others it acts to improve satiety and encourage weight loss. Flaxseed is also a good source of omega-3 and omega-6 fatty acids which have multiple health benefits for the animal such as improving coat quality. Flax seed is also one of the richest sources of alpha linoleic acid (ALA). ALA can be converted by the dog to DHA and EPA to carry out various functions in the body.

=== Fructooligosaccharides and mannanoligosaccharides ===
Fructooligosaccharides, commonly known as FOS, consist of many different types of indigestible oligosaccharides. FOS is shown to be beneficial in providing a source of energy for the good gut bacteria in dogs. Mannanoligosaccharides are also known as MOS which also have an effect on the overall gut health in dogs. These compounds both contain oligosaccharides however; they work in different manners. Constipation prevention and treatment can be carried out by the supplementation of FOS by its subsequent effect on gut bacteria. MOS works in a different manner by effecting the attachment of bad bacteria in the gut of the dog. These bad bacteria attach to the epithelial lining of the gastrointestinal tract and can cause the beginnings of pathogenic diseases. MOS works to counteract these by preventing the binding of these deleterious bacteria.

A study carried out in dogs determined that these two compounds when supplemented together can help with overall immune function. This is due to the decrease in overall bad bacteria and an increase in good bacteria in the gastrointestinal tract. These two compounds also were not found to have any detrimental effects on food consumption, stool quality or stool output.

== Brain and cognitive health ==
A dog's brain undergoes many pathological changes during the aging process. Some of these changes can include damage to the DNA (deoxyribonucleic acid), a decrease in the amount of myelin overlay on nerve cells as well as a buildup of protein in the brain which can potentially have toxic effects. Due to these physiological changes senior and aging dog can have possible impairment of proper cognition. This impairment can include complex learning tasks as well as memory issues.

=== Vitamin E ===
The addition of Vitamin E as an antioxidant in senior dog food can have a positive effect on brain and cognitive health. Vitamin E is a fat soluble vitamin which works to prevent oxidative damage from occurring. Reactive oxygen species can develop in the brain and can have a harmful effect by causing oxidative stress on the tissues if they are not subdued by antioxidants. Mitochondrial aerobic metabolism is thought to be the largest source of reactive oxidative species. As the mitochondria age their function declines which causes an increase in the production of oxidative species.

Studies carried out in aging dogs looking at the effects of antioxidant supplemented diets have shown that older dogs supplemented with antioxidants including Vitamin E were able to correctly perform tasks more often than senior dogs whose diets were not supplemented. It has also been shown that in senior dogs consuming these antioxidant enriched diets there was an increase in positive behavioural actions during the feeding period compared to senior dogs consuming diets that were not supplemented.

=== L-carnitine ===
L-carnitine is an amino acid and precursor of acetyl-L-carnitine which is a mitochondrial cofactor. It acts to help with overall mitochondrial function as well as lipid metabolism which is an important function of mitochondria. This is important as an increase in mitochondrial function will help to reduce the rates of oxidative reactions in the brain which overall decrease damage to DNA and stimulates better cognitive function.

== Skin and coat health ==
Several physiological changes in the senior pet can lead to a decline in skin and coat health. Some of these changes include a loss of elasticity in the skin which leads to wrinkling, hair follicle atrophy which can cause hair loss, a decrease in oil secretion which can lead to dry and flaky skin as well as a loss of melanocytes which causes the loss of pigmentation of the hair follicles. Skin and coat health is one of the most noticeable aging changes due to the fact that it results in a change in appearance of the senior dog. Skin and coat health are important to upkeep as dogs age and there are many components in senior dog foods that can benefit this important area of health.

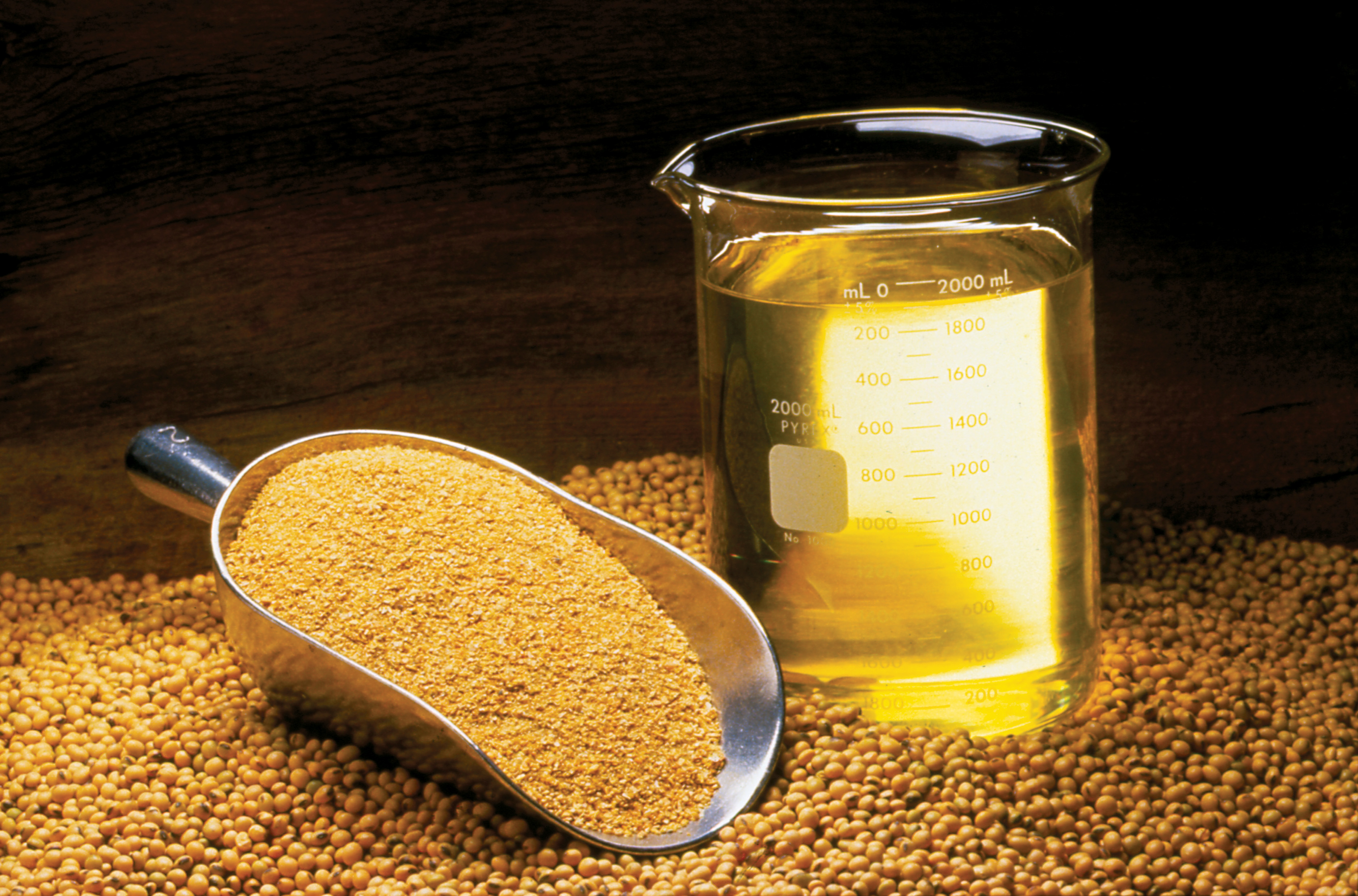
Soybean oil is a good source of linoleic acid.

=== Linoleic acid ===
Linoleic acid is a polyunsaturated fatty acid that is classified as an omega 6-fatty acid. Linoleic acid plays an important role in the maintenance of the water barrier of skin. This helps prevent the dryness and scaly skin that occurs during the aging process. Omega 6-fatty acids can also have a slight anti-imflammatory role. Good sources of linoleic acid to look for in senior dog foods include corn oil, soybean oil and poultry fat.

=== Vitamin A ===
Vitamin A is a fat soluble vitamin that aids in the keratinization process of hair. This process is important in maintaining a healthy coat in the aging dog and preventing the deterioration of epithelial tissues. Dogs do not directly need a source of Vitamin A as they can convert beta-carotene (a precursor to Vitamin A) into Vitamin A. However, Vitamin A supplementation in senior dog diets can assist senior dogs in maintaining their coats as their sebaceous activity and skin elasticity decrease. Vitamin A supplements can be included in senior dogs diets however there are also other good sources of Vitamin A. These include milk, egg yolk, and liver. The inactive form of Vitamin A, beta-carotene can be found in high amounts in carrots.

=== Zinc ===
Zinc is one of many trace minerals recommended for dogs of all ages. Dogs experience loss of elasticity and dryness of the skin as they age. The addition of zinc in the diet aids in the development of collagen and wound healing, and also will prevent the skin from becoming dry and flaky. Senior dogs can obtain zinc in their diet through the addition of various ingredients, including; red meats, whole grains, poultry by-product meals, and fish meals.

=== Copper ===
Loss of hair pigmentation is a common concern for senior dogs. Copper has been shown to improve coat conditions by reducing dry skin and improving the overall pigmentation of the coat. Therefore, copper may able to delay the natural aging process of the whitening of a dog's coat.

=== Riboflavin ===
Senior dogs require a larger amount of riboflavin for maintenance compared to adult dogs. Vitamin B2, also known as riboflavin, plays an important role as a cofactor for the metabolism of carbohydrates. Riboflavin is required in the diet to prevent cracking and dry skin, as well as a darkening of the pigmentation of skin. Riboflavin is also important for the vision of the senior dog as deficiencies can cause alterations in blood supply to the cornea which may lead to impaired vision and potential blindness. A source of riboflavin in senior dog diets is important to help prevent changes that aging can cause on skin.

== Immune system health ==
Immune functions start to decline due to compromised ability to efficiently produce various proteins and cells that are important for the body's defense system as dogs age. Free radicals can cause oxidative stress, killing the cells or impairing the functional capability of the cells, which leads to weakening of the immune system. Therefore, providing dietary antioxidants can be an effective method to prevent the oxidative stress and support the immune system.

=== Ratio of omega-6 to omega-3 fatty acids ===
Omega-6 and omega-3 fatty acids are very important for a strong healthy immune system and for preventing chronic disease in dogs. It is crucial in pet diets that the ratio of omega-6 to omega-3 fatty acids is properly balanced in order to achieve optimal health.

It is recommended to have a ratio of 5:1 to 10:1, with there being more omega-6 fatty acids than omega-3's. AAFCO has a maximum ratio listed of 30:1. For ideal health and decreased risk of low-grade chronic inflammation, it is more beneficial to have a lower ratio versus a higher one. Omega-3 fatty acids have anti-inflammatory properties and therefore need to be supplemented in a closer ratio to omega-6's which are more inflammatory. Out of all of the omega-3 fatty acids that could be used, the most potent are found in fish oil in the forms of EPA and DHA, these have the highest immunomodulatory activities. Omega-3 fatty acids tend to increase antioxidant requirements because they oxidize so rapidly, therefore when they are in a closer ratio to omega-6 fatty acids, as recommended, antioxidants must also be supplemented in the diet.

=== Vitamin E ===
Vitamin E is an antioxidant that can be supplemented in the diet in order to strengthen the effect of fatty acid supplementations. This vitamin works to decrease the production of pro-inflammatory markers that are found in synovial fluid of the joints. With the help of this antioxidant, chronic inflammation can be avoided which aids senior dogs in maintaining a healthier immune system as well as helping to ease the symptoms of osteoarthritis. Also, formation of H_{2}O_{2}, which is a reactive oxygen species that suppress lymphocyte proliferation, can be decreased by vitamin E.

=== β-Carotene ===
Beta-carotene can be found in certain vegetables and it is a highly potent antioxidants. The number of T-cells is naturally decreased with age, leading to compromised immune function. However, in old dogs supplemented with dietary beta-carotene had no statistical difference in the amount of CD4+ T cells when compared to younger dogs. It can also enhance cell-mediated immune responses and help prevent cancer. Dogs supplemented with high dose of dietary beta-carotene may show red discoloration of feces and staining of hair. However, toxicity level of beta-carotene in dogs is not clearly understood as dogs can also cleave beta-carotene into vitamin A in their intestines.

=== Prebiotic and probiotic ===
Since the gastrointestinal tract is exposed to foreign materials from ingested food, a healthy microbiota in the gut is a very important component of the immune system. Prebiotic and probiotic supplements can help maintain healthy gut flora. Examples of common prebiotic ingredients in dog foods are Fructooligosaccharides(FOS), Mannanoligosaccharides (MOS), and beta-glucan. Examples of common probiotic ingredients in dog foods are Lactobacillus acidophilus and Enterococcus faecium.

== See also ==
- Dog
- Aging
- Aging in dogs
- Dog health
- Obesity in pets
- Cancer in dogs
- Dog food
- Animal nutrition
- Dental health diets for dogs
- Puppy nutrition
