= Dog allergy =

Dog allergy may refer to:

- Allergies in dogs
- Allergy to dogs
