= Dog biscuit =

Nutritional supplement for dogs

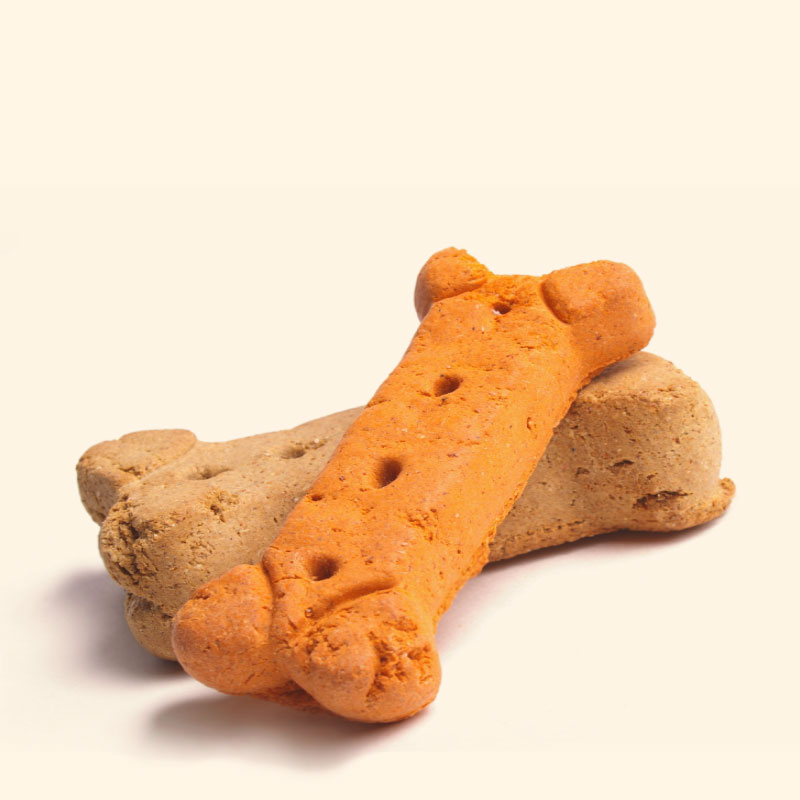
Dog biscuits

A dog biscuit, also going by names such as a dog treat, is most often described as a hard, biscuit-based, sometimes dietary supplement for dogs or other canines, marketed to be “A similar version of the snacks humans often enjoy.”

Dog biscuits tend to be hard and dry. While they do often differ in toughness depending on the specific brand's advised use, they are generally distinguished by the flat bone like shape.

When prescribed by a vet, the common use is often for the animal's oral health, as the dry and hard biscuit texture helps to clean the dog's teeth. It is sometimes seen as the dog equivalent of brushing their teeth.

Another item of consideration is the therapeutic benefits for the dog, fulfilling their ancestral instincts of hunting; while causing no danger, chewing is a highly relaxing activity, clearly shown to lessen anxiety.

== History ==
"Dog's bread", made from bran, has been mentioned since at least Roman times. It was already criticized (as in later centuries) as particularly bad bread; Juvenal refers to dog's bread as "filth" - "And bit into the filth of a dog's bread" Et farris sordes mordere Canini.

In Spain, "pan de perro" is mentioned as early as 1623 in a play by Lope de Vega. It is used here in the sense of giving someone blows; to "give dog's bread" to someone could mean anything from mistreating them to killing them. The latter meaning refers to a special bread (also called zarazas) made with ground glass, poison and needles and intended to kill dogs.

The bread meant as food for dogs was also called parruna and was made from bran. This was very likely what was referred to in associating the bread with (non-fatal) mistreatment.

In France, Charles Estienne wrote in 1598: "Take no notice of bran bread,... it is better to leave it for the hunting, or shepherd, or watch dogs." By the nineteenth century, "pain de chien" had become a way of referring to very bad bread: "It is awful, general, they give us dog's bread!"

The English dog biscuit appears to be a nineteenth-century innovation: "With this may be joined farinaceous and vegetable articles — oat-meal, fine-pollard, dog-biscuit, potatoes, carrots, parsnips" (1827); "being in the neighbourhood of Maidenhead, I inspected Mr. Smith's dog-biscuit manufactory, and was surprised to find he has been for a long period manufacturing the enormous quantity of five tons a-week !" (1828)

William Blackwood's Agriculturalist's Notebook from 1841 explains that in southern England, sporting dogs were given dog biscuits rather than barley meal. According to Blackwood, barley meal is not sufficient for a dog's diet without bones, as dogs gnaw and have stomachs which are designed for animal product. Small families often could not obtain enough meat and bones, which could lead to ailments, especially coupled with lack of exercise from being chained. A bag of dog biscuits, available for five shillings, would be a sufficient substitute for a yard dog during the year. They were made of "coarse, yet clean and wholesome flour", inferior to a sailors' biscuit. They were to be soaked in water or pot liquor for an hour or two. If there was no meat, dripping or lard would be added to it while softening.

In later years, dog biscuits began to be made of meat products and were sometimes treated as synonymous with dog food. In 1871, an ad appeared in Cassell's Illustrated Almanac for "SLATER'S MEAT BISCUIT FOR DOGS - Contains vegetable substances and about 25 per cent of Prepared Meat. It gives Dogs endurance, and without any other food will keep them in fine working condition."

In England, Spratt's Dog Biscuits obtained a patent for the product, and seems to have claimed to have invented the food. According to Michael Schaffer, most accounts attribute the dog biscuit industry to James Spratt, an electrician from Cincinnati. Spratt had patented a new type of lightning conductor in 1850, and he traveled to England later in the 50s to sell it. In London, he had an epiphany when he saw a group of dogs eating discarded hardtack. In 1860, still in England, Spratt showcased Spratt's Patent Meat Fibrine Dog Cakes, which consisted of wheat, beetroot, vegetables, and beef blood. Competitors then arose, such as Dr. A. C. Daniels' Medicated Dog Bread and F. H. Bennett's Malatoid Dog Biscuits. Schaffer described them as embracing "the dubious science and the lightly regulated hucksterism of their era." Autocar Messenger in 1920 called it "the first attempt to lift the dog out of the class of scavenger which he had occupied from caveman times", noting that Spratt's Patent had control over the early untouched market despite competitors coming out with their own products.

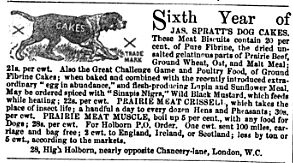
1867 advertisement for Spratts dog food

In at least one case in 1886, Spratt sued a seller accused of substituting another product, which was an early example of a company fighting knock-offs. Spratt's biscuits were square shaped and stamped with the words "Spratt's Patent" and a cross in the middle. Mr. Warnett, a general dealer at St. Albans, was alleged to have sold imitations which did not have the actual ingredients, passing them off as actual Spratt biscuits. Spratt also alleged that several people asked Warnett for Spratt's dog biscuits only to receive biscuits similar in every regard, save for being stamped with a hexagon and the phrase "American meat."

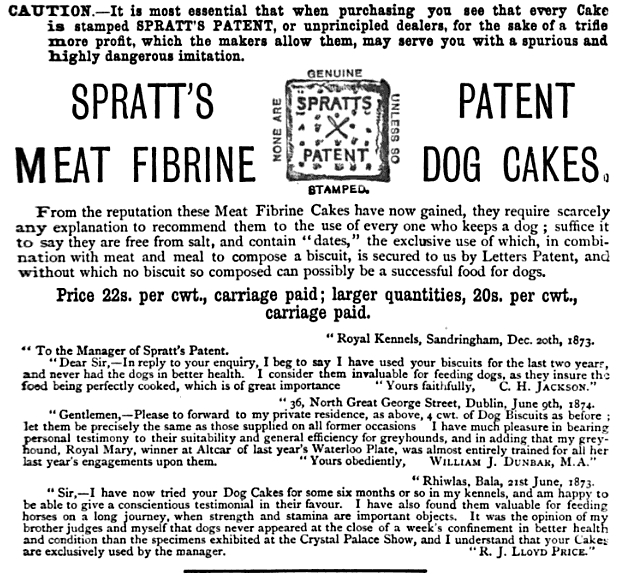
1876 advertisement for Spratt's Patent Meat Fibrine Dog Cakes

Spratt lost in this case and the judge regretted that he could not grant the defendant court costs.

At one point after this, as an industrial product, dog biscuits were classified in the same category as soap: "Of the making of dog biscuits, which the census places in the same category with soap, as using animal refuse from which soap grease has been extracted, it is unnecessary to say much."

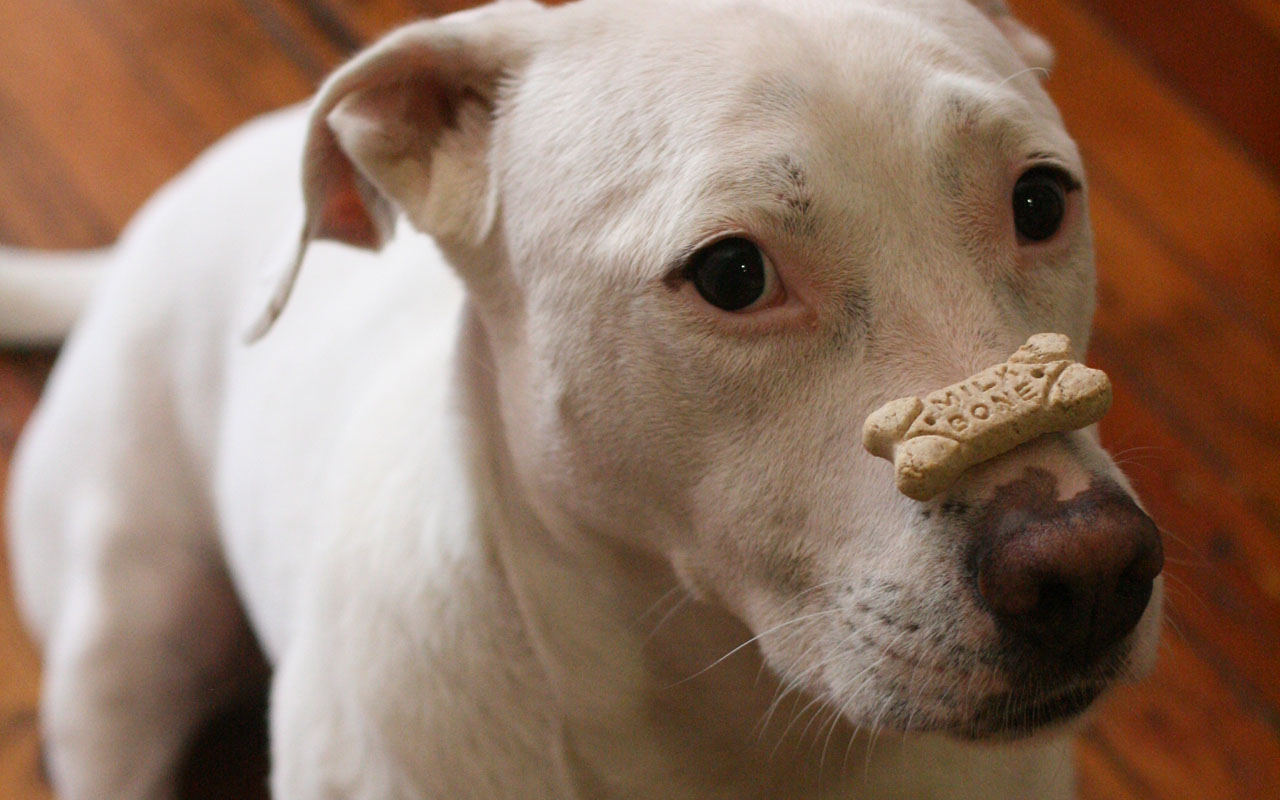
Dog waiting for Milk Bone treat

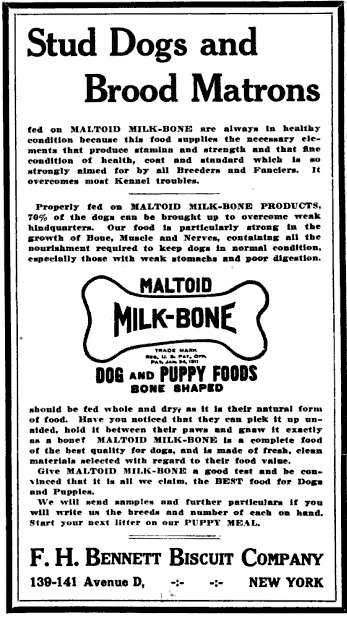

Spratt dominated the American market until 1907, when F. H. Bennett, whose own dog biscuits were faring poorly against those of the larger company, had the idea of making them in the shape of a bone. "His 'Maltoid Milk-Bones' were such a success that for the next fifteen years Bennett's Milk-Bone dominated the commercial dog food market in America." In 1931, the National Biscuit Company, now known as Nabisco, bought the company.

== World's largest dog biscuit ==
The world's largest dog biscuit weighs 279.87 kg and was baked to be 2,000 times larger than average by Hampshire Pet Products from Joplin, Missouri, US.

This record was superseded on May 9, 2025 when 8 people from the Belgian United Petfood Group created a lamb and rice dog biscuit weighing 515.6 kg (1136 lbs and 11.254 oz).
