= Lamb meal =

Dog food ingredient

Lamb meal is a popular ingredient in dog food. It is the dry rendered part from mammal tissues, specially prepared for feeding purposes by tanking under live steam or dry rendering. Though the meat has been cooked, dried, and ground, it is still meat, and has not had any blood, hair, hoof, horn, hide trimmings, manure, stomach or rumen contents added to it.
