= Nature's Variety =

Pet food company

- Industry: Pet food
- Founded: 1 December 2005
- Headquarters: St. Louis, Missouri Lincoln, Nebraska
- Products: Dog food, cat food, grain-free pet food, raw pet food
- Website: naturesvariety.com

Nature's Variety is a pet food company, wholly owned by Barcelona, Spain–based Agrolimen. With manufacturing facilities in Lincoln, Nebraska, and headquarters in St. Louis, Missouri, Nature's Variety specializes in natural, raw, and grain-free foods for dogs and cats, including dry kibble and canned varieties.

== Brands ==
Nature's Variety owns and manages the Instinct and Prairie brands.

Instinct is a full line of grain-free and gluten-free foods for dogs and cats available in a variety of forms and flavors.

Prairie is a line of canned and kibble dog and cat food that utilizes meat as the first ingredient, whole grains and fruits and vegetables.

== Food safety ==
Nature's Variety uses a food safety protocol called high pressure processing (HPP or pascalization) in its raw food. HPP is a process that kills pathogenic bacteria through high-pressure, water-based technology.
