= Filler (animal food) =

Non-nutritive animal food ingredient

In animal feed, a filler is an ingredient added to provide dietary fiber, bulk or some other non-nutritive purpose. Products like corn fiber (corncobs), fruit fibers (pulp), rice bran, and whole grains are possible fillers.

== Purpose ==
As sources of dietary fiber, a filler has little inherent nutritional value for a monogastric (non-ruminant) animal insofar as calories are considered. On the other hand, this property makes it useful for managing the caloric density of a food formula, so that the animal does not overeat. Cheaper fillers like corncobs may also serve to adjust the price of food.

== Effects ==
- Cellulose, beet pulp and pectin/Gum Arabic fibers help cats develop proper fecal consistency and overall colon health.
- Cellulose fiber reduces postprandial blood sugar levels in naturally diabetic cats.
- Adding 10-20% apple pomace reduces food energy density and protein absorption by cats. Although the latter is undesired in the usual case, it may be useful for animals with kidney disease.
- Compared to 26% corn starch control, 26% rice bran causes lower taurine blood levels by adjusting bile acid excretion.
- Hydrolyzed hemicellulose from softwood, a paper industry by-product, improves the gut microbiome and the immune system in mice.
- Fibers increase satiety of food. Fermentable fibers have a satiety-increasing effect beyond simple bulking of food in dogs.

Adding too much fiber makes the food less palatable, so a balanced amount should be given, or else there will be reduced nutrient intake and poorer coat and skin quality. Like in humans, fibers add bulk to stool, so too much fiber can lead to an uncomfortably large amount of bowel movement for the animal. Again like in humans, fermentable fibers feed the gut microbes, and too much of it would cause flatulence, soft stools, even diarrhea.

== Criticism ==
According to critics, many commercial pet foods contain fillers that have little or no nutritional value, but are added to decrease the overall cost of the food, especially when pet food manufacturers attempt to keep their pet foods at a desired price point despite rising manufacturing, marketing, shipping, and related costs. Critics allege that low-grade fiber fillers actually aggravate the intestinal walls instead of promoting health, and that carnivores such as cats are not able to effectively digest plant-derived fibers in their hindgut.

In rare cases, contaminated fillers have led to large-scale recalls at significant expense to the pet food companies. Two examples are aflatoxin on corn in the 2006 Diamond Dog Food Recall and melamine, which may have contaminated wheat gluten and other protein concentrates in the 2007 pet food recalls. (Wheat gluten does have a nutritive purpose in providing protein, so its status as a filler is dubious.)

== Alternatives ==
Adding water to dry food reduces the energy density of food, but does not produce any reduction in obesity of dogs. Doing the same works on adult neutered cats, however.

== See also ==
- Dog food
- Meat by-product
- Meat extender
