= Animal digest =

Pet food ingredient

Animal digest is a common ingredient used in pet foods. As defined by the Association of American Feed Control Officials, digest is produced by the chemical or enzymatic hydrolysis of clean animal tissue that has not undergone decomposition. These animal tissues may not include hair, horns, teeth, hooves, or feathers, with the exclusion of trace amounts that are unavoidable even after acceptable processing methods.

According to the United States Food and Drug Administration (FDA), a digest is an additive that has been treated with heat, enzymes, or also acids to produce a concentrated product intended as a natural flavoring. Pet food may legally be labelled as "Chicken Flavored" regardless of the percentage of chicken-derived product it contains, so long as the chicken flavoring is deemed "perceptible."

If a product is labeled as "flavored" by a certain type of meat, the digest it contains must have been produced from tissues pertaining to the listed animal species. For instance, chicken flavored food must be flavored with chicken digest.
