= Allergies in dogs =

Immune system response

Dogs are susceptible to allergies much like their human companions. Most allergies occur in dogs over 6 months old. A dog that is repeatedly exposed to a particular allergen becomes sensitized to it, and the immune system overreacts to a subsequent exposure, most commonly manifesting in the form of skin irritation. Some of the signs are redness, itching, hair loss, and recurring skin infections from the irritation. The dog may be more prone to scratching and licking at the irritated site, further exacerbating the problem.

Other common signs of allergies include coughing, sneezing, wheezing, ocular and nasal discharge, vomiting, diarrhea, and licking of the paws.

While it may be possible to identify the cause of an allergic response, it is best to seek attention from a veterinarian to identify the best treatment possible. To identify the specific allergens to which the dog is sensitive, veterinarians will commonly use a serum allergy test or a skin allergy test. Veterinarians may recommend either over the counter Benadryl without added decongestant or Zyrtec to alleviate clinical signs. If the allergy is more severe, allergy immunotherapy may be recommended.

There are a number of different kinds of allergies from which dogs may suffer. They may be gut-induced, skin-induced, and respiratory-induced.

== Allergies ==
=== Gut-induced allergies ===
Gut-induced allergies, or food allergies, are common health concerns. They may be induced by an allergic reaction to the preservatives or artificial coloring used in commercial dog foods, or they may be triggered by the intact protein source used in the food. Protein sources that commonly offend include beef, soy, chicken, and turkey.

Clinical signs of gut-induced allergies include the presence of rashes, itchy or tender skin, gastrointestinal upsets like vomiting and diarrhea, and swelling.

Dogs with sensitivities to food that contain these common proteins may benefit from food that contains a novel protein source. A novel protein is any protein not commonly used in dog food, such as elk, rabbit, or bison. Novel protein diets make up the majority of hypoallergenic dog food diets.

=== Skin-induced allergies ===
==== Flea allergy dermatitis ====
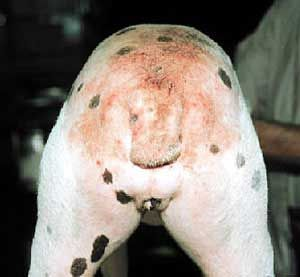
Dog with flea allergy dermatitis and secondary folliculitis

Flea allergy dermatitis is caused by the bite of a flea. The primary cause is due to the flea's saliva that is injected into the feeding site, triggering an immune response in the dog. This may include redness of the skin and pruritus, causing the dog to scratch, bite, and lick parts of the body, most commonly the base of the tail, abdomen, and head. A dog may find it soothing to be bathed in cool water with a shampoo designed for flea treatment. If the dog has self-mutilated by chewing or scratching, antibiotics may be needed, depending on the severity of the problem.

==== Bacterial hypersensitivity ====
Bacterial hypersensitivity is caused by an exaggerated immune system response to the natural flora normally found on the skin, like Staphylococcus bacteria. It may be identified by red blotches, pus pockets, hair loss and a skin formation that looks like ringworm, called epidermal collarettes. Typically, bacterial allergies are secondary to other problems the dog may have, such as parasitism or hormonal disorders.

==== Contact allergies ====
Contact allergies are the rarest form, alleviated by cessation of contact. The signs of contact allergies are very similar to those of flea allergies - skin irritation at the point of contact and itching. Sources of allergens include, but are not limited to, the synthetic materials in bedding, plants, pesticides, or household cleaning products.

=== Respiratory-induced allergies ===
==== Atopy ====
Atopy is synonymous with "inhalant allergy." It manifests as a condition called atopic dermatitis, which is characterized by itching, biting, hair loss and face rubbing. Other signs may be the presence of papules, which are small red bumps, or pustules, which are small pimple-like lesions. Atopy is a genetic disorder that predisposes the immune system of a dog to react to tree pollens, grass pollens, weed pollens, molds, mildew, and house dust mites, and can also be caused by exposure to chemical irritants, like common household products. Dogs will often have reactions to multiple allergens and may also experience concurrent flea or food allergies. Certain breeds are prone to atopic dermatitis, like Golden Retrievers, Irish Setters, Lhasa Apsos, Dalmatians, Bulldogs, and Old English Sheepdogs. The German Shepherd is also a high-risk breed for atopic dermatitis; a genome-wide association study in the breed linked the condition to a locus on chromosome 27 containing the PKP2 gene, which encodes plakophilin 2, a protein important for skin structure.

Treatment methods include special shampoos, prescribed oral steroids, oral cyclosporines, and natural treatments like administration of omega-3 fatty acids. Desensitization therapy, involving the repetitive administration of allergy injection serum, may help desensitize the immune system to that particular allergen.

=== Medication-induced allergies ===
Dogs can have allergic reactions to certain medications just like humans can, though it is not as common as the other allergies. It is important to know how to look for adverse effects, especially after vaccinations or a dosage of new medication. Anaphylaxis reactions can quickly lead to severe health issues. Anaphylactic symptoms include cold feet, collapse, muscle weakness, hyperventilation, extreme drowsiness, weak pulse, and trouble breathing. Common allergy symptoms to look out for include diarrhea, hives, intense scratching, runny rose, shaking head, watery eyes, sneezing, and a red rash on the body. If the dog is having a suspected allergic reaction, it should be checked by a veterinarian.

Precautions can ensure an allergic reaction to medication does not happen. These include prevention of double-dosing, mixing different medications without talking to a veterinarian, and giving the wrong dosage. These are simple measures to ensure there are no mistakes made when providing medication.

== See also ==
Hypoallergenic dog food
