= Hypoallergenic dog food =

Food for allergy-prone dogs

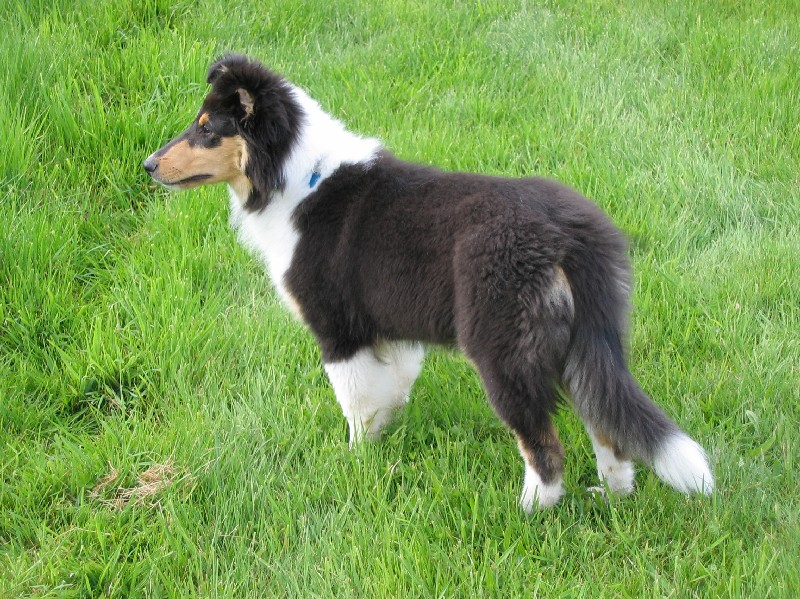
Allergies affect many different dog breeds, but collies are one of the breeds that are commonly affected

Hypoallergenic dog food diets are used for dogs that experience food-related allergies causing adverse effects to their physical health, usually in the form of itchy skin. This is a true, immune-mediated reaction. They are also useful for dogs with food intolerance, usually resulting in gastrointestinal signs, especially chronic diarrhea with or without vomiting.

The molecules that usually become allergens or that incide food intolerance, are intact proteins or glycoproteins. Hypoallergenic dog food diets offer a variety of protein sources that are unique by using proteins that are not recognized by the dog's antibodies as being antigens. Examples include diets with hydrolyzed protein with various origins, and diets with a single meat seen less often in commercial dog food, such as kangaroo, salmon, duck and venison meat, bones and sinews.

Hypoallergenic diets can also be used as a basis for an elimination diet, to begin the process of identifying which specific food(s) a dog is allergic or reactive to.

Additional supplements are commonly added to hypoallergenic diets, in order to decrease the inflammatory response involved with food allergies and sensitivities. They include omega 3 fatty acids, vitamin A, vitamin E, and prebiotic soluble and insoluble fibers.

== Hypoallergenic diets for dogs ==
A hypoallergenic diet is a diet which is less likely than the average diet to cause an allergic reaction in a dog, when that diet is eaten. The reaction is usually related to inflammation and itching in skin and ears. Hypoallergenic diets can also help dogs with a food intolerance. A food intolerance is a reaction involving the gastrointestinal tract, and most commonly results in vomiting or chronic diarrhea. Proteins, especially animal proteins including dairy, are the ingredients most likely to cause this, although wheat and corn can also cause problems

Hypoallergenic diets were created to be able to present a dog with a protein that they had not been exposed to previously. Food allergies and food intolerances develop when a dog is exposed to a protein, so they will not initially show any signs when first presented with a new protein.

There are 2 ways to accomplish this: Use hydrolyzed proteins, which are chemically treated to break down large protein molecules into small molecules. In July 2025 the most common proteins in hydrolyzed protein diets available in the US came from soy, chicken, chicken liver, salmon, and pork.

Novel ingredient proteins, which dogs have not been exposed to previously. In July 2025 in the US, the most common novel ingredient diets had kangaroo, salmon, duck, venison as their main protein source.

Adding novel protein sources, such as novel meats that a dog or its ancestors have never been exposed to is one method. Novel proteins can also be created by chemically modifying well known protein sources using hydrolysis techniques, rendering proteins unrecognizable by the gastrointestinal tract. Not all antigens are specific to proteins, however, and it is possible for almost anything that the body ingests to become an allergen. Providing diets with a limited amount of ingredients can be used for diagnostic purposes, as well as for dogs who are allergic to the common ingredients that are used in pet food. Certain nutrients are commonly incorporated into hypoallergenic dog food to help alleviate the symptoms of an allergic reaction. These ingredients include omega-3 fatty acids, Vitamins A and E, zinc, novel carbohydrates, and fiber.

== Allergen responses and symptoms ==
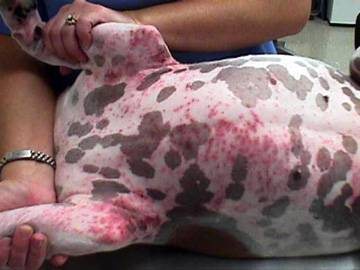
Rashes are common in dogs suffering from food-related allergic reactions

Allergens can elicit both immunologic and non-immunologic responses. Immunologic reactions, also known as Type 1 reactions, are caused by the binding of ingested molecules to specific immunoglobulin E (IgE) antibodies. Once binding occurs, mast cell degranulation follows, releasing granules that initiate the symptoms of an allergic reaction in the body. These immunological reactions are almost instantaneous, and it is widely accepted that the molecules which bind to IgE antibodies are usually intact proteins. Non-immunologic, or non-IgE mediated reactions are less understood, but are known to present similar symptoms as immunologic reactions. These reactions can be classified under food sensitivities, and it is argued that they are not truly allergenic. Whether a reaction is truly allergenic in nature or a sensitivity, it is important that hypoallergenic dog foods provide the ingredients necessary to keep canines from experiencing discomfort.

The signs of a canine food allergy or sensitivity vary greatly, but the most common to look for include rashes, swelling, itchy or tender skin, and gastrointestinal upsets. These signs are very similar to, but should not be confused with canine atopic dermatitis, which is not caused by food allergies.

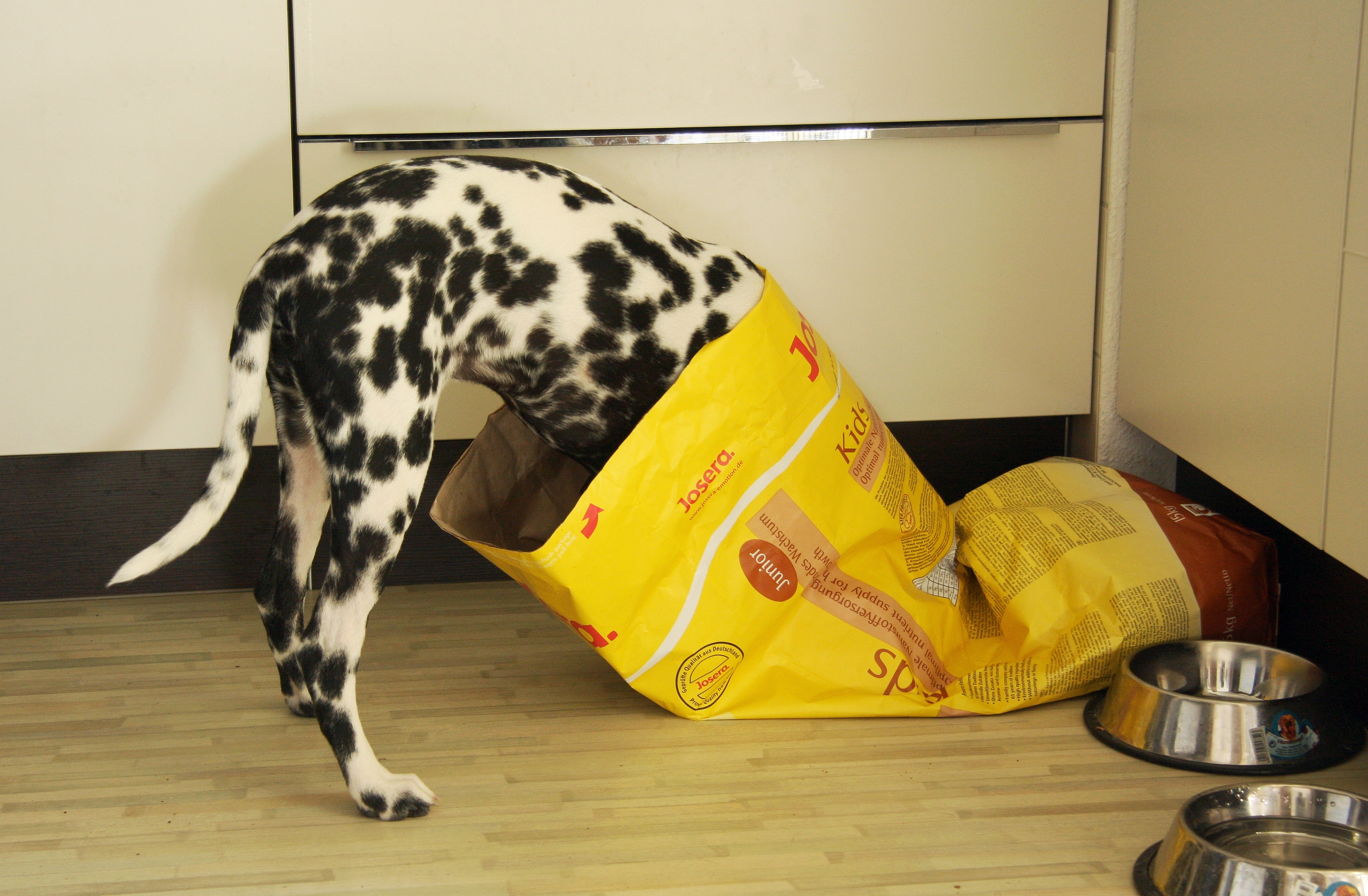

== Diet types ==
=== Hydrolyzed protein diets ===
One of the possible causes of food allergies in dogs is a reaction of the dog's immune system to the proteins in a diet. One method that may be used to try and combat this immunologic response in dogs with food allergies is the use of hydrolyzed proteins in the diet. Whole proteins are composed of single amino acids organized into a chain, which then interact in order to fold the protein into its final three-dimensional structure. Hydrolyzed proteins are whole proteins that have been broken down into smaller polypeptides through a process called protein hydrolysis. One method of protein hydrolysis involves the use of enzymes specific to proteins called proteases. Proteases act by cleaving or cutting whole proteins at specific amino acids within their structure in order to form multiple small polypeptides from a single whole protein. Different proteases are specific to different amino acids, and as such multiple proteases may be used in order to cut a protein at several different locations. The theory behind the use of these small peptides in food as an alternative to whole proteins is that their small size will prevent them from stimulating the immune system of the gut, thereby reducing and/or preventing an allergic reaction. When hydrolyzed proteins are used in hypoallergenic canine diets it is with the hopes of avoiding an immunologic reaction both in dogs that have consumed the whole protein previously and in dogs whose intestinal tract has never seen the whole protein before but has been known to react to other protein types.

=== Novel protein diets ===
Beef, soy, chicken, turkey and egg products are commonly used ingredients in commercial dog foods as a source of protein. These protein sources have been proven to elicit an allergic response in dogs with food allergies. Novel sources of protein can be used in place of these allergenic ingredients to meet the feeding requirements for a dog, while minimizing or eliminating the chances of an allergic response. For a protein to be considered novel, it must be one that the dog has not consumed before. Novel protein sources include venison, kangaroo and fish, such as salmon.

=== Limited ingredient diets ===
Introducing a food that consists of limited ingredients is a common method of reducing the occurrence of food related allergic reactions in dogs. Limited ingredient diets are made up of fewer ingredients, typically limiting the formula to one protein, carbohydrate, and/or fat. This is an attempt to improve digestion and reduce the likelihood of a reaction ensuing in dogs with sensitivities to common ingredients found in most commercial dog foods. These diets will avoid protein and carbohydrate sources, such as beef, dairy, poultry, barley, and wheat. There are many feed ingredients that have been observed to predispose animals to diet related reactions. This is due to their frequent exposure to such ingredients, which makes it likely for them to adopt sensitivities and allergies to commercial dog foods. Studies have shown that it is possible for dogs to have symptoms caused by more than one ingredient in a given diet, this makes the use of a limited ingredient diet relevant as a result of the inclusion of single protein and carbohydrate sources. If symptoms of food allergies persist after the introduction of this type of diet, it can also be helpful for determining the new allergen that is causing the adverse reaction due to the limited number of ingredients. Although these diets consist of fewer dietary ingredients, they still provide all the necessary nutrients to meet the animal's requirements.

== Nutrients included in hypoallergenic diets ==
=== Omega-3 fatty acids ===
Essential n-3 fatty acids in dog food help to treat the inflammation associated with allergic reactions. These essential fatty acids help to manage inflammatory responses by changing the levels of pro-inflammatory and anti-inflammatory eicosanoids produced during a reaction. They also help to maintain healthy skin and to maintain cell structure. These n-3 fatty acids are usually incorporated into dog food diets by using ingredients like fish oil.

=== Vitamin A ===
Vitamin A is involved in cell growth and division, as well as hair growth and skin maintenance. Since some of the key symptoms of food allergies include damage to the skin, it is important to include Vitamin A in hypoallergenic diets to help clear up the damage done by any previous allergic reactions a dog may have had. Ingredients in dog food that function as a source of vitamin A are fish oils such as cod oil.

=== Vitamin E ===
Vitamin E is an antioxidant which has important functions in immune health. These compounds scavenge for free radicals, protecting cell membranes from damage caused by lipid oxidation. This is beneficial to have in hypoallergenic dog food diets to help maintain cell integrity in case damage does occur due to a reaction. Vitamin E is commonly found just as a vitamin supplement in diets, but it is also present in other food ingredients such as soybean oil, corn oil, olive oil, and sunflower oil.

=== Zinc ===
Zinc supplementation in hypoallergenic dog foods aids in the maintenance of skin and coat health. Zinc also plays a role in mitigating inflammatory and immune reactions. Zinc can be found supplemented as a mineral in the diet, but it can also be added in the diet through lamb meat, as this ingredient is known to be high in zinc.

=== Novel carbohydrates ===
Carbohydrates are large macronutrients which supply energy to the organism consuming them, and include nutrients such as sugars, oligosaccharides, and starches. Dogs may become sensitive or allergic to certain carbohydrate sources in their diet, and novel carbohydrates may be used in an attempt to avoid this reaction. Novel carbohydrates are carbohydrates which the dog they are being fed to has never consumed before. Some examples of novel carbohydrate ingredients include brown rice and sweet potato, as well as brewer's rice.

=== Fiber ===
Negative digestive effects that accompany dietary food allergies can be reduced by including soluble and insoluble fibers. Insoluble fibers have a relatively low fermentability, which help to decrease the negative digestive effects such as gas and soft stools. When soluble fibers are mixed with water they form a gel-like substance which helps to reduce gastric emptying in order to increase the time available for nutrients to be absorbed in the gastrointestinal tract. Compounds called fructooligosaccharides (FOS) are found in various soluble fibers, which aid in promoting intestinal health. FOS act as a prebiotic to increase the growth of beneficial bacteria and hinder the growth of pathogenic bacteria in the animal's digestive tract. Common ingredients in dog food that provide such fibers include beet pulp, cellulose and chicory root.

== See also ==
- Dog food
- Dog health
- Veterinary medicine
- Animal allergy
- Allergy
- Fatty acid
- Rash
- Pet food
- Food intolerance
- Border Collie
- Collie
