= Puppy nutrition =

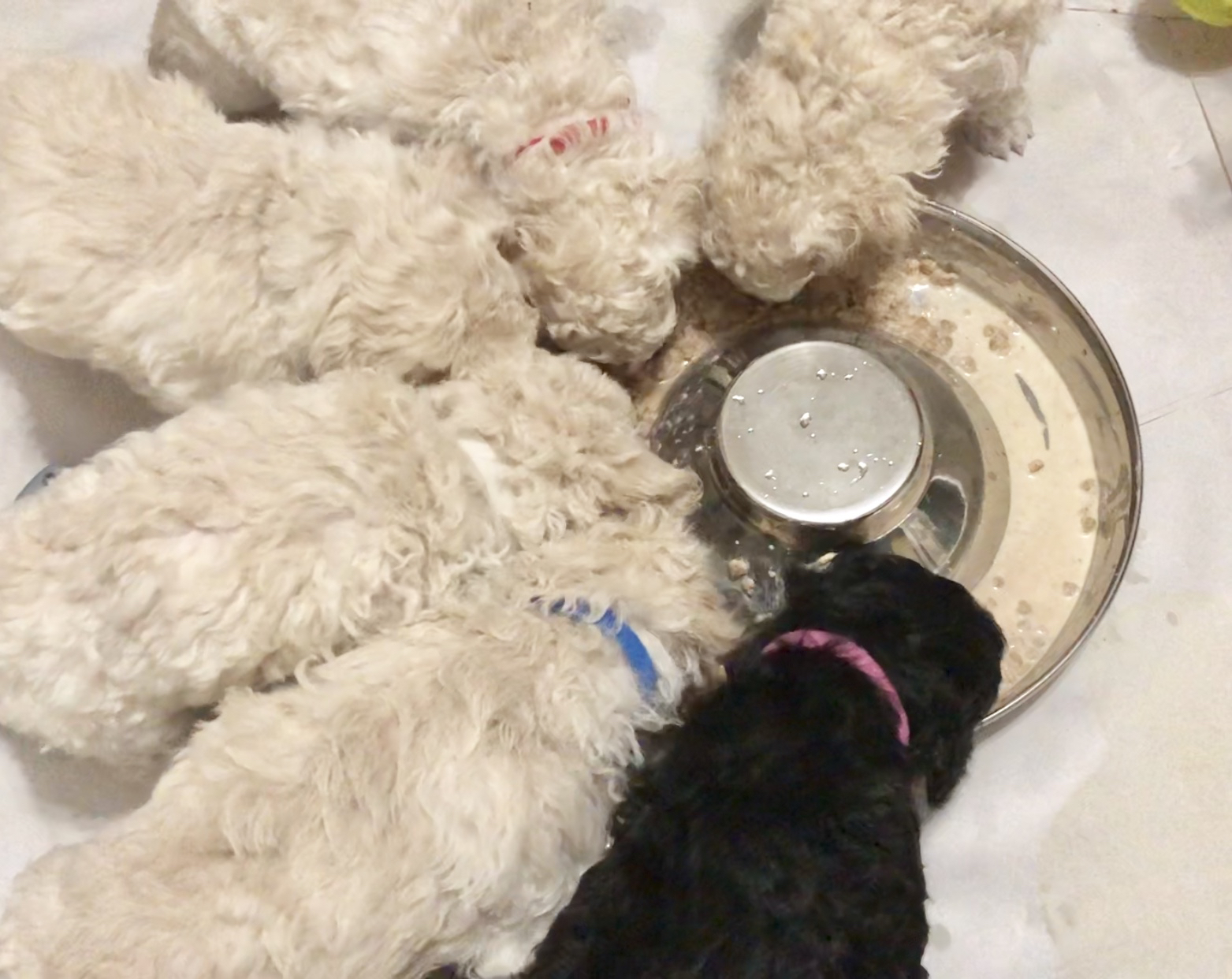
6 healthy puppies getting nutrition at feeding time

The developmental life stage of dogs requires a specific intake of nutrients to ensure proper growth and development and to meet energy requirements. Despite the fact that puppies have different nutritional requirements compared to their adult counterparts, of the 652 breeders surveyed in the United States and Canada in 2012, 8.7% report feeding puppies commercial diets not intended for the developmental life stage of canines. Large and small dog breeds have even more specific nutrient requirements during growth, such as adjusted calcium to phosphorus ratio, and as such should receive a breed specific growth formula. Feeding diets formulated by a nutritionist for specific breeds and life stage differences in nutrient requirements ensures a growing puppy will receive the proper nutrition associated with appropriate skeletal, neurological and immune development. This includes nutrients such as protein, fibre, essential fatty acids, calcium and vitamin E. It is therefore important to feed puppies a diet that meets the minimum and/or maximum requirements established by the National Research Council.

The nutritional requirements determined by the NRC are based on scientific evidence and used as the basis for nutritional adequacy in cats and dogs. However, these values are based on the assumption that the availability and digestibility of the nutrients are not variable, although in reality, this is not the case. The Association of American Feed Control Officials (AAFCO) also has recommended nutrient levels, but their values serve primarily as regulatory guidance. AAFCO bases their recommendations on feeding trials and are not necessarily supported by scientific evidence; however their nutritional adequacy statement on pet food bags is considered an important part of the label because their recommendations account for ingredient variability. Other agencies involved in pet food regulations include the FDA in the United States who directly regulates the sales of pet food, the FEDIAF in Europe and PFIAA in Australia who recommend regulatory requirements for the pet food industry, as well as others. When selecting puppy food, it is important to consult the labels and ensure products meet the standards of regulatory agencies of your respective country.

== Energy ==
Young growing dogs require greater amounts of energy per unit body mass than fully grown adult dogs. From time of weaning until the puppy reaches 40% of the adult body weight, the optimal energy intake per unit body weight is twice that of an adult dog of the same breed. From 40% to 80% of adult body weight, energy requirements decrease to 1.6 times the adult requirement, and from 80% to the end of growth, this decreases further to 1.2 times the adult energy requirement. Because of this, it is important to ensure that puppy diets contain higher amounts of energy than adult dog foods. However, over nutrition associated with feeding ad libitum results in accelerated skeletal growth and weight gain leading to osteopenia, especially in large breed dogs. Therefore, appropriate energy requirements should be met, but not exceeded in the growing dog.

Owners and puppy raisers should monitor their puppy's weight gain by referencing a 9-point body condition score scale which is easily accessible on the internet, regularly weighing the puppy, and consulting with their veterinarian. Owners should also be mindful as to the energy level of their puppy; high energy level puppies will require more energy and may need to be fed extra amounts of food, just as lower energy puppies may require less food. The 9 point body condition score has been shown to be an effective method for estimating percent body fat in dogs. Therefore, by adhering to the 9 point body condition scale, and adjusting food intake accordingly, owners will be able to maintain their puppy at an appropriate weight throughout its growth. In addition to visual estimates of body condition, physical palpation of the pet can provide insight on general health and weight. Speaking to a licensed veterinarian can be very beneficial, as they can help develop these dietary and weight monitoring skills.

== Calcium and Phosphorus ==
An important aspect of the composition of puppy food is the calcium and phosphorus content. Bone mineral is composed mainly of calcium, which functions in skeletal mineralization during growth. Puppies younger than 5 months are not able to adjust the absorption of calcium in response to intake, therefore an oversupply or undersupply can be harmful. When raised on diets deficient in calcium, pathological bone fractures can result. These fractures have been shown to occur in smaller breed puppies when their diet contained less than 0.33% calcium on a dry matter (DM) basis. Larger breeds present with fractures at a calcium level of less than 0.55%, thus requiring these breeds to have greater calcium requirements.

The ratio of calcium to phosphorus greatly impacts the retention of phosphorus. A ratio of 1.3:1 will allow for good phosphorus retention, but levels above a ratio of 2:1 will decrease phosphorus retention. Raising puppies on diets containing excess calcium and phosphorus will result in osteochondrosis which disturbs bone remodeling and cartilage and bone maturation. These changes are noticed in larger breed puppies at lower levels of excess than in smaller breeds. Because large breed puppies are more sensitive to deficient and excess calcium and phosphorus levels, it is important to ensure that their diets contain sufficient amounts of both. The minimum requirement laid out by the NRC is 8.0g/kg DM calcium (0.8%), with a 12g/kg DM (1.2%) recommended allowance. However, recommendations laid out by AAFCO consist of slightly higher calcium values; 1.2% to 1.8% on a DM basis, whereas phosphorus levels should be between 1.0% and 1.6%, with a ratio of calcium to phosphorus between 1:1 and 2:1. Many commonly used ingredients, such as corn, which are added in high amounts to commercial dog foods do not contain adequate amounts of calcium, and as such, calcium supplements are often added to the formulation to ensure proper amounts for development. In addition, a descriptive study of over-the-counter maintenance dog foods determined that 4/45 of the foods studied contained calcium concentrations that exceeded the AAFCO recommendation, but were labeled for all life stages. Therefore, it is important to feed a diet specifically recommended for the developmental life stage and consult the calcium and phosphorus levels in puppy foods.

== Fats and Fatty Acids ==
Fat is a nutrient that provides more energy per gram than all other nutrients. Fat provides 9.4kcal/g of gross energy (GE) compared to protein and carbohydrate which only provide 5.56 and 4.15 kcal/g respectively. Due to this greater energy concentration and the higher energy demand of puppies, the higher fat content of canine development diets helps reach these increased energy requirements while also providing the essential fatty acids necessary for the growing dog. Omega-3 (n-3) fatty acids are an important component of puppy diets. Multiple studies suggest brain and retinal function are dependent on the level of n-3 polyunsaturated fatty acids acquired during in-utero development and postnatal life. DHA is the main n-3 fatty acid and can be obtained as DHA itself from dietary sources such as fish and fish oils, or as the DHA precursor linolenic acid. With a high DHA intake, plasma lipid DHA content increases, aiding neurological development, as demonstrated by increases in memory and learning ability. Other benefits of n-3 and DHA include promotion of neurogenesis, increased neuron size and phospholipid synthesis, as well as protection against cell death and peroxidative brain damage by damaging free radicals in the rodent model and presumably across the mammalian kingdom. A deficit of dietary n-3 fatty acids leads to a reduction in brain DHA content by 50-80%, leading to cognitive deficits and increased n-6 fatty acid level which increases inflammation. Adequate intake and recommended allowance levels of 85g/kg (DM) of total fat (8.5%), and 0.5g/kg (DM) of omega 3 fatty acids (EPA+DHA) are laid out by the NRC. Both of these values are also laid out as recommendations by AAFCO. However, according to a study on the effects of supplementing DHA in puppy diets, diets containing 1.4% n-3 fatty acids, or 0.19% DHA resulted in optimal neurological function.

== Vitamin E ==
Along with DHA, vitamin E also supports the proper development of eyesight, reduces oxidative damage, and provides additional immune function support. During instances of immune system stimulation, such as vaccinations and infection, immune cells generate more tissue damaging free radicals. These free radicals are reduced by the action of antioxidants such as vitamin E, which promote the formation and maintenance of healthy immune cells. The adequate intake level laid out by the NRC consists of 24 mg/kg (36 IU/kg) of vitamin E, with a recommended allowance of 30 mg/kg (45 IU/kg). However, the regulatory guidance laid out by AAFCO states a vitamin E minimum recommendation of 50 IU/kg DM. Nonetheless, these values have been shown to be insufficient for immune protection; immune function is best optimized at a level of 500 IU/kg. In addition to prevention of free radical damage, this higher level of vitamin E greatly increases the number of memory CD4+ immune cells, aiding in a greater and a longer response to infection. Due to their still-developing immune system, puppies are more susceptible to infection than adult dogs, and proper levels of vitamin E, as indicated above, are needed in their diet.

== Fibre ==
Although young growing dogs have immature gastrointestinal tracts, they do contain microflora which can ferment fibre and generate short chain fatty acids beneficial to gut health. Colonization and establishment of these bacterial populations happens over time, beginning immediately after birth. Even with the ability for fermentation, addition of fibre to the diet should be done carefully, as fibre will dilute other nutrients in the feed. There are different types of fibre, all are made of carbohydrates, and NRC classifies them into fermentable and non-fermentable carbohydrates. Fermentable carbohydrates are generally 3-10 monosaccharide units joined by glycosidic bonds which cannot be degraded by endogenous enzymes and require the fermentation processes of intestinal microflora for proper degradation. Non-fermentable fibres are carbohydrate structures which are not fully fermented even by intestinal microflora. Little research has been done on non-fermentable fibre, however it is known that it causes fecal bulking and reduced intestinal transit time. It has been shown that addition of non-fermentable fibre in concentrations of 22% or greater of the total diet will reduce growth, feed intake and feed efficiency.

Fermentable fibre is more beneficial for growing puppies, and it is often considered a prebiotic, meaning it supports the growth of beneficial microflora species in the intestinal tract. Fermentable fibre often contains fructo-oligosaccharides (FOS) and mannanoligosaccharides (MOS), both of which greatly stimulate gut health. FOS are fermented by beneficial bacteria such as bifidobacteria promoting their growth, while most pathogenic bacterial strains such as E. coli, C. perfringens and Salmonella are unable to ferment it. MOS has been shown to stimulate the immune system and increase resistance to pathogenic bacteria. Beet pulp is generally the standard fermentable fibre used in canine diets, however blends of fermentable fibre sources have been shown to be as effective at promoting gut health. Although fermentable fibre is extremely beneficial, it should still be added in moderate amounts as addition of fermentable fibre to a concentration of 14.1% or greater will result in lower digestibility of the feed.

== Protein ==
Growing puppies require higher levels of protein than adult dogs of the same breed to promote proper growth and development. Protein should account for at least 25% of energy; however protein requirements also depend on the digestibility of the protein and age of the puppy. Amino acid and nitrogen requirements decrease between 10 and 14 weeks, indicating that different protein levels are often beneficial before and after 14 weeks of age. Before 14 weeks of age, a protein level of 250 g/kg of diet (25% of the diet) containing 4.0 kcal ME/g will result in optimal growth. After 14 weeks of age, protein requirements decrease to 200 g/kg of diet (20% of the diet) for optimal growth.

Protein in excess of these levels is metabolized and leads to an increase of the glomerular filtration rate, and increased urea excretion in the urine, with no evidence of damage to the kidneys. However, addition of protein past these requirements is not recommended, although the NRC has not quantified a safe upper limit. Considering that the energy density of protein is similar to that of carbohydrates, an excess of protein in the diet may lead to fat deposition and weight gain. This excess weight can lead to abnormal joint development, potentially giving rise to joint issues in the future. Additionally, excess of some amino acids may also have detrimental impacts; for example, excess lysine will negatively antagonise arginine. The minimal requirement laid out by the NRC is 180g/kg (18%) DM of crude protein, with a recommended allowance of 225g/kg (22.5%) DM. With this in mind, it is also important to consider the quality and digestibility of the protein used.

== Iodine ==
To date, there is little information available about minimum requirements of dietary iodine for developing puppies. However, literature suggests that overdosage of iodine in puppies has deleterious effects on the thyroid gland. High dietary iodine may cause both hypothyroidism and changes in bone metabolism, considering that thyroid hormones are key factors in osteogenesis, as they stimulate osteoblasts, and promote collagen synthesis and mineralization of the osteoid. This is particularly important during juvenile development, as these hormones favor the action of growth hormone (GH) and its facilitator, insulin growth factor-1 (IGF-1) at the osteoplastic level. Hypothyroidism acquired at an early age presents a delay in the maturation and development of the ossification sites of newly developing bone. It is therefore important to closely monitor the amount of iodine in puppy diets in order to prevent overdosage. The NRC states an adequate intake and recommended allowance of 900 μg/kg (DM) which translates into 220μg/1000 kcal. These values have been shown in multiple studies to be the recommended maximum allowance of iodine that would result in no abnormalities.

== Synopsis ==
Canine development diets are designed specifically to meet the energy demands and nutritional requirements for healthy growth. Proper nutrition is imperative to support development of bones, joints, muscles, and the immune system, and includes the addition of nutrients such as protein, essential fatty acids, calcium, fibre, vitamin E, and others. Ensuring optimal energy intake allows the diet to meet the high energy demands of puppies while avoiding over nutrition, over-accelerated growth, and unhealthy weight gain. Dietary fats also help to meet these high energy demands and provide the essential fatty acids necessary for brain, neuron, and retinal development and function. Since growing puppies require greater amounts of protein than their adult counterparts, it is important to include the appropriate amounts to support healthy development. Correct levels of both fermentable and non-fermentable fibre help to support GI and immune health. During growth, young dogs are more susceptible to infection, but the addition of proper levels of vitamin E to the diet reduces free radical oxidative damage and leads to an increase in immunity. Calcium and phosphorus, in the appropriate amounts and ratio, aid in proper bone and cartilage growth and maturation. It is imperative to be aware of the levels of other minerals as well, as the over-dosage of iodine can lead to hypothyroidism, and the delay in maturation and development of bones. It is therefore important to feed a diet that meets the nutrient minimum and/or maximum requirements established by the National Research Council in order to ensure optimal growth and development of young dogs of all breeds.
