= Dental health diets for dogs =

Oral disease is one of the most common diseases found in dogs. It is caused by the buildup of various anaerobic bacteria in the mouth which forms plaque, eventually hardening into tartar on the teeth along the gum line, and is related to the development of gingivitis. Since small and toy breeds have a much smaller jaw but contain the same number of teeth, crowding allows higher bacterial build up and puts them at higher risk of developing periodontal disease.

Although daily brushing provides the best preventative measure, feeding a dental diet or using dental chews for dogs is an effective approach pet owners can take to help prevent and control accumulation of plaque and tartar to avoid consequences of severe periodontal disease. Dental diets consider many aspects of oral health such as inflammation, bone health and physical and chemical characteristics of the kibble when being formulated. Some diets, chews and/or other oral products may also strive to receive approval by the Veterinary Oral Health Council (VOHC) for validation of their product's claims.

== Bone health ==
Teeth play a vital role in an animal's survival; they are used for eating, grooming and defense.

Each tooth is made up of a crown, which is above the gum line and covered in enamel, and roots that anchor the tooth to the alveolar bone. Beneath the enamel, there are collagen fibres and inorganic hydroxyapatite, which together form dentin. Hydroxyapatite is the storage form of calcium found in the bone.

Blood calcium concentration are kept within a narrow range. If deficient, calcium will be mobilized from the bone to compensate imbalances.

The ratio of calcium to phosphorus is essential to bone and teeth health; if there is excessive phosphorus within a diet, it can result in resorption and reduction of the alveolar bone as shown in Henrikson's studies when dogs were fed a low calcium, high phosphorus diet.

Vitamin D also plays a major role in calcium absorption and bone health because it helps to maintain calcium homeostasis and bone metabolism. Deficiencies negatively impact parts of the teeth including the gingivae, periodontal ligaments and the alveolar bone, leading to degeneration of the teeth and jaw.

According to the Association of American Feed Control Officials (AAFCO) dietary recommendations based on dry matter content, the maximum amount of calcium within a diet is 1.8% and the phosphorus content within a diet cannot exceed 1.6%. These recommendations ensure that the calcium to phosphorus ratio will be 1:1, or at max 2:1. AAFCO also states that the maximum amount of vitamin D within a canine diet cannot exceed 3000 IU/kg.

== Inflammation ==
One of the main aims of dental food for dogs is to minimize plaque accumulation and gingival inflammation. The oral cavity of dogs can be exposed to a variety of bacteria, parasites and viruses from their environment and it is not surprising that these induce an inflammatory reaction in the periodontium. The accumulation of these bacteria, along with extracellular polysaccharides and salivary glycoproteins, leads to the formation of plaque. This bacteria buildup in plaque causes gingival inflammation and indirectly stimulates activation of the host immune system. Severe gingivitis in dogs can further advance into periodontal disease in which the periodontal tissues begin to degrade and, if left untreated, can lead to tooth loss. Studies have also shown that periodontal disease can negatively affect systemic health which impacts the overall health of the dog, therefore exhibiting the importance of preventing periodontal disease. Using a dental diet may be beneficial towards preventative care in regards to periodontal disease. Dental diets not only try to combat the buildup of plaque physically, but attempt to reduce plaque build up chemically as well. Chemical compounds such as anti-microbial elements are added to some dental diets to directly target the oral cavity in order to prevent gingivitis.

== Chemical compounds in kibble ==
Excessive plaque formation can lead to severe inflammation of the gums which may result in the loss of teeth. This plaque is also able to mineralize on the teeth, creating a crystallized calcium phosphate build up known as tartar. Ingredients such as polyphosphate, zinc salts, and chlorhexidine have active properties to help prevent or reduce the formation of plaque and tartar. These compounds are able to work on the whole mouth including between teeth and all the way up to the gum line, and is not limited to just the chewing contact surface area.

Polyphosphates constitute a wide variety of compounds that have beneficial effects on oral health, the most effective of these are the hexametaphosphates, tripolyphosphates and pyrophosphates and may be attached with an alkali metal, alkaline metal, ammonium or a salt. Sodium tripolyphosphates as an example, are able to bind directly to the enamel as well as the mineralized sections of the teeth where it takes up the binding sites for calcium to attach, and interacts with calcium already bonded to enamel, to prevent it being able to form crystals. Calcium mixed in the saliva can also be bound by sodium tripolyphosphates thus further preventing crystal formation. Sodium tripolyphosphates are also beneficial for stain prevention, and can be broken down in the digestive tract and provide a source of phosphorus and allows the undeposited calcium to be available for whole body metabolism.

Zinc compounds, more specifically zinc ascorbate, also play a role in preventing plaque accumulation due to antimicrobial activity. Zinc salts inhibit bacterial growth by binding to sulfur to control plaque formation, as well as reduce foul oral odours. However, research has only been performed on cats, so the same evidence may not be directly applicable to dogs.

Chlorhexidine is another example of a non-specific antimicrobial agent. It acts by disrupting bacterial deposition and plaque formation on the teeth, further assisting in reducing gingivitis. Chlorhexidine can also reduce the amount of pre-existing plaque. Chlorhexidine is generally found on products such as dental chews or oral rinses and may not be suitable for use in a long-term diet as prolonged use may lead to staining of the teeth and tongue, and change the taste of the food.

Such components of the diet may help prevent plaque accumulation, thus reducing the overall inflammatory state of periodontal disease in dogs.

== Physical characteristics of kibble ==
The physical characteristics of dental kibble are very important as they contribute to the mechanical cleaning of the tooth's surface. The kibble need to be large and very dense to promote chewing, as more time spent chewing will aid in the decrease of accumulation of plaque, tartar and calculus. When the kibble is being chewed, the broken pieces rub against the tooth's surface and scrape off the buildup of bacteria that forms the tartar, plaque and calculus. Ingredients that have an adequate amount of carbohydrates and are high in insoluble fibers (typically around 10%), such as soy fiber, wheat bran fiber or cellulose fiber, are added to increase the density of the kibble to assure it does not easily crumble and promotes a texture favourable to scraping of the tooth. Increasing the diameter will also significantly reduce the accumulation of plaque and calculus compared to traditional dog food as it will require more chewing by the molars. Traditional hard kibble will not have the same effects on oral health as it has been proven that the increase in fiber and diameter is what provides those benefits in the diet. A disadvantage is that the mechanical cleansing is more beneficial for the molars compared to the incisors and canines. The incisors and canines are typically used for grabbing and tearing, whereas the molars are used for crushing and chewing, so most of the contact with the broken kibble is in the back of the mouth. The physical characteristics and chemical agents of the kibble work together to delay the buildup of plaque, and are both equally important to the cleansing of the dog's teeth.

== Veterinary Oral Health Council ==
The Veterinary Oral Health Council (VOHC) is operated by the American Veterinary Dental College and provides a Seal of Acceptance to diets, treats, chews, water additives and other formulations and products that have been formulated specifically for dental health. They must have clinical evidence to mitigate the effects of periodontal disease in accordance to their standards and protocols to the alleged claims of plaque and/or tartar control.

Trials are not conducted by the VOHC itself, but by the companies applying for the Seal and must follow strict protocols and guidelines to minimize error and bias between trials. Trials are also specific to either tartar or plaque claims. The Seal is recognized by various veterinary dental associations worldwide.

== See also ==
- Veterinary dentistry
