= Association of American Feed Control Officials =

U.S. non-profit organization

Coordinates: 40°5′38″N 88°14′23″W

- Type: Non-profit organization
- Location: United States

The Association of American Feed Control Officials (AAFCO) is a non-profit organization which sets standards for the quality and safety of animal feed (fodder) and pet food in the United States. AAFCO is a voluntary organization consisting largely of state officials who have responsibility for enforcing their state's laws and regulations concerning the safety of animal feeds. AAFCO also establishes standard ingredient definitions and nutritional requirements for animal feed/pet food. Most states have adopted the AAFCO models or use them in the regulation of animal feed/pet food. AAFCO meets twice yearly, typically in January and August, so that committees and the board of directors can conduct the organization's business of assessing the need for changes to the Model Bill, model regulations, ingredient definitions, etc. Once per year, the latest version of all AAFCO-approved documents is printed in the organization's Official Publication.

Its voting members are representatives from each state in the United States, Puerto Rico, Costa Rica, Canada, the U.S. Food and Drug Administration (FDA) and the U.S. Department of Agriculture. Additionally, there are non-voting advisors on each AAFCO committee who are mainly from industry, such as the National Grain and Feed Association, Pet Food Institute, and American Feed Industry Association. AAFCO meets twice per year, in January and August, to conduct its business.

Unlike the FDA, AAFCO has no regulatory authority. However, AAFCO members have enforcement authority in their respective state or federal agencies. The AAFCO model regulations on feed ingredients have been adopted by many states; other states have adopted similar regulations. In 2007, the Center for Veterinary Medicine at the FDA formalized its relationship with AAFCO in identifying feed ingredients.

== Official publication ==
The AAFCO official publication contains the latest version of all AAFCO-approved documents. It has been criticized for being too expensive for pet food consumers to access, and by the FDA's legal advisor team for referring to a non-federal document. The publication is available in book form and, since 2013, an online browsable form.

== Further information ==
- Official site
