= Noise phobia in dogs =

Fear of loud noises in dogs

Dog noise phobia, along with dog noise anxiety, are terms sometimes used by dog owners and veterinarians to describe canine fear of, and the corresponding stress responses to, loud noises.

Noise-related phobia are common in dogs, and may be triggered by fireworks, thunderstorms, gunshots, and even bird noises. Associated stimuli may also come to trigger the symptoms of the phobia or anxiety, such as a change in barometric pressure being associated to a thunderstorm, thus causing an anticipatory anxiety.

== Signs of dog noise anxiety ==
Signs and symptoms of dog noise phobia may include:

- Urinating or defecating
- Vomiting
- Hiding
- Chewing
- Panting
- Pacing
- Digging
- Trying to jump out of windows or otherwise escape
- Drooling
- Seeking out the owner
- Flatulence
- Barking
- Trembling
- Dilated pupils

Milder symptoms may become exaggerated after repeated exposure to the phobia stimuli.

The symptoms may present immediate physical danger to the dog, as in the case reported by Katherine A. Houpt, VMD, Ph.D., where a fleeing dog was hit by a vehicle. The progression of mild phobia to a significant one merits immediate treatment of any level of noise phobia.

== Common problem noises ==
A variety of noises can provoke a dog's noise anxiety:

- Thunderstorms
- Fireworks
- Vacuums
- Construction noises
- Sirens
- Gunshots
- Noises from a television
- Prolonged shouting or screaming from owner/s and/or children in the home, especially if the former is raised in anger
- Pots and pans clattering together
- A backfiring vehicle driving by

Visuals, smells, and even barometric pressure or electrostatic changes can become associated with these noises progressively and then serve to further aggravate the condition.

== Treatment options ==
While it may not always be possible to remedy noise anxiety completely, effective management of the symptoms and associated dangers and discomforts are possible through a variety of treatments with varying effectiveness.

=== Medications ===
Commonly used medications include:

- Diazepam
- Clorazepate
- Alprazolam
- Amitriptyline
- Clomipramine
- Fluoxetine
- Melatonex (Melatonin)
- Selegiline

Many of these medications are not specifically available in veterinary formulations but may still be prescribed by a veterinarian as an extra-label drug.

==== Possible negative effects of medication in dogs ====
Side-effects, drug interactions, and allergenic sensitivities are concerns when administering any medication to a person's dog. The Canine Liver Disease Foundation claims that many common drugs also can lead to liver damage in dogs, although they do not specifically cite any of the abovementioned drugs prescribed for dog anxiety.

Some drugs may result in sedation or general mood alteration of a dog. The website for Clomicalm (Clomipramine Hydrochloride) states it does not alter a dog's personality or sedate it, but does list lethargy/depression, vomiting, diarrhea, and an elevation in liver enzymes as possible results.

=== Pressure wraps ===
Several "pressure wraps" or "body wraps" have appeared for sale to address the problem of dog noise anxiety. Dr. Donald Heagren, DVM, has cited the success one retail brand of pressure wrap, in regards to helping dogs deal with fireworks, while Dr. Shereen Farber, OTR, has similarly vouched for the successful functioning of another called The Anxiety Wrap.

There are existing theories to explain the effectiveness of maintained body pressure in treating a dog's noise anxiety, although there are not yet any existing studies specifically examining this treatment in this specific context. The mechanism that allows pressure to treat other forms of anxiety in humans and other animals may be responsible for any successes.

One example of successful treatment of anxiety through application of constant body pressure by a wrap is that of Temple Grandin's "hug machine". Temple Grandin, after seeing how cattle would calm down while being put into a squeeze chute to receive their shots, developed a machine based on the same principle to treat the anxiety resulting from her own autism. Her "hug machines" function by maintaining a constant pressure on the body, leading to a reduction in anxiety.

Linda Tellington-Jones' "TTouch" technique, designed as a way of relaxing and training horses and eventually adapted to dogs as well, sometimes utilizes an ace bandage wrapped around the animal. Body wraps are also used to extend the benefits of the other aspects of the treatment.

=== Training ===
Different forms of training and behaviour modification may aid or, eventually, eliminate the symptoms or sources of dog noise anxiety. It is, however, important not to punish your dog if it is exhibiting symptoms of noise anxiety, as the punishment may increase the fear associated with the scenario. While it's been speculated that comforting your pet may reinforce their fearful behavior, this has been revealed to be a myth; the reality is that, while it does not directly help the animal in question, it also does not cause any apparent harm, nor does it perpetuate the problem.

==== Desensitization ====
Desensitization involves the introduction and gradual increase of the anxiety-causing stimuli in order to reduce the dog's stress response. The dog is trained to be calm when confronted with low-volume recordings of the source of the fear, which are then incrementally increased, allowing the dog to maintain a calm that can extend to a full, normal experience of the noise.

This training method is more successful in dogs than in cats, but still usually requires at least a weekly training session for the lifetime of the dog. Commercial CDs for the express purpose of dog noise desensitization are available.

==== Counterconditioning ====
Counterconditioning, in contrast to desensitization, attempts to condition the fear stimulus with positive associations. Treats, a favorite toy, activity, or a place, are presented prior and following a thunderstorm, for example.

With repeated reinforcement, the dog should eventually come to associate the noise with the positive experience and be undaunted by future occurrences.

==== Possible advantages and disadvantages of training ====
Training, in contrast to other remedies, often requires a large dedication of time at regular intervals. Some dogs may require the training routine to be extended for their entire lifetime to effectively manage the symptoms of noise anxiety. The use of trainers, also, may be prohibitive in cost. Finally, some dogs show little-to-no response from training of any duration

In contrast, it is sometimes possible to train one's own dog without the hiring of a trainer or purchasing of products, and some dogs may respond very well to training. Furthermore, the danger of side effects as may be present with medication are not a concern.

=== Exercise and nutrition ===
Vigorous exercise and nutrition may contribute to a reduction of noise anxiety, along with general stress.

An increase in the amount of physical exertion on days where the fear-response is expected to occur can tire and relax the dog physically and mentally, as well as produce serotonin, which can act in the capacity of a natural sedative.

High-protein diets have been linked to some behavioral problems in dogs. A consultation with a veterinarian may yield dietary advice able to play at least a small role in reduction of the dog's anxiety symptoms.

=== Sound therapy ===
Certain ambient noise, music or can be is played to calm and entertain dogs. It is may be used to relieve separation anxiety or noise phobia. Examples include the radio broadcasts by Classic FM on Fireworks Night and the podcasts and playlists produced by Spotify.

== See also ==
- Clomipramine
- Dog behavior
- Dog health
