= Pet Check Technology =

Dog walking app

Pet Check Technology is an online software and mobile application for dog walking companies and dog walking customers. The application uses QR codes, e-mail alerts, and GPS tracking, to show customers when and where their dogs went with their walkers. Pet Check Technology was launched in the Los Angeles area in August 2011.

== About ==
Pet Check Technology was created in 2011 by Doug Simon, founder of the Chicago-based dog-walking company Walk the Dog. Pet Check Technology was created to help check that dogs were being walked for the time allotted on the dog walker's schedule.

Pet Check Technology provides dog-walking companies with tools for scheduling customers, billing, and tracking dog-walking employees. Pet Check also allows users to see when their dog was taken out for a walk, where they went, and what time they got back.

== Functionality ==
The dog walker scans a QR code with the Pet Check mobile app for iOS or Android when arriving to pick up a dog. The app displays their schedule as well as any notes for the customer walk reports. The app then uses GPS to track the walk. Scanning the QR code again will end the walk. The customer can track the walk on an map. Completed walk reports are stored.
