= Mastocytoma in dogs =

Cancer tumor in dogs

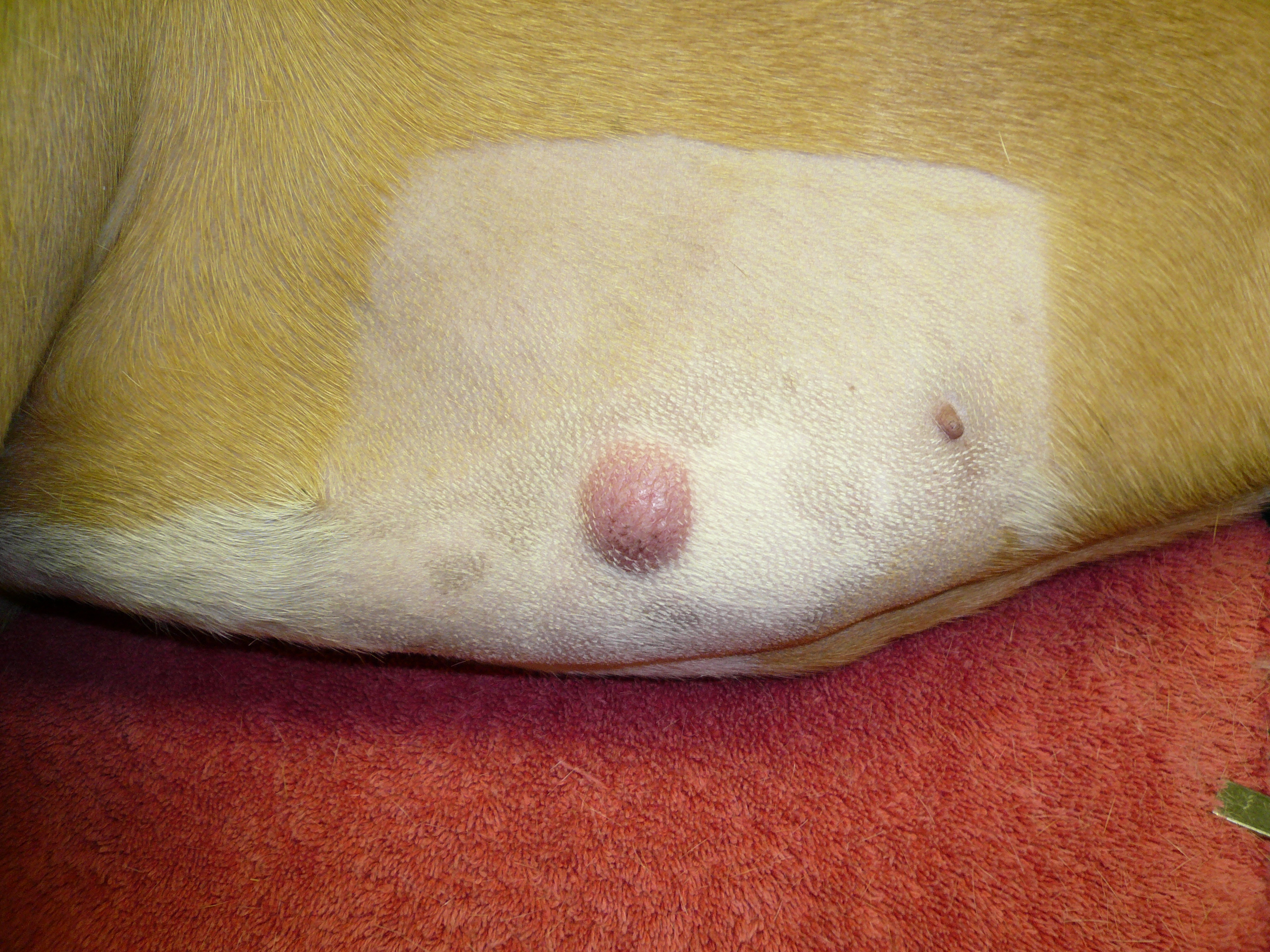
Mastocytoma of the skin of the lateral abdominal wall in a German boxer

A mastocytoma in dogs (or mast cell tumor in dogs) is a neoplasm (neoplasia) originating from mast cells in the domestic dog, which occurs mainly in the skin and subcutis. Mastocytoma are not only extremely common in dogs, but also tend to be much more malignant in them than in other animal species. The average survival time for malignant tumors is only four months, whereas for benign tumors it is over two years.

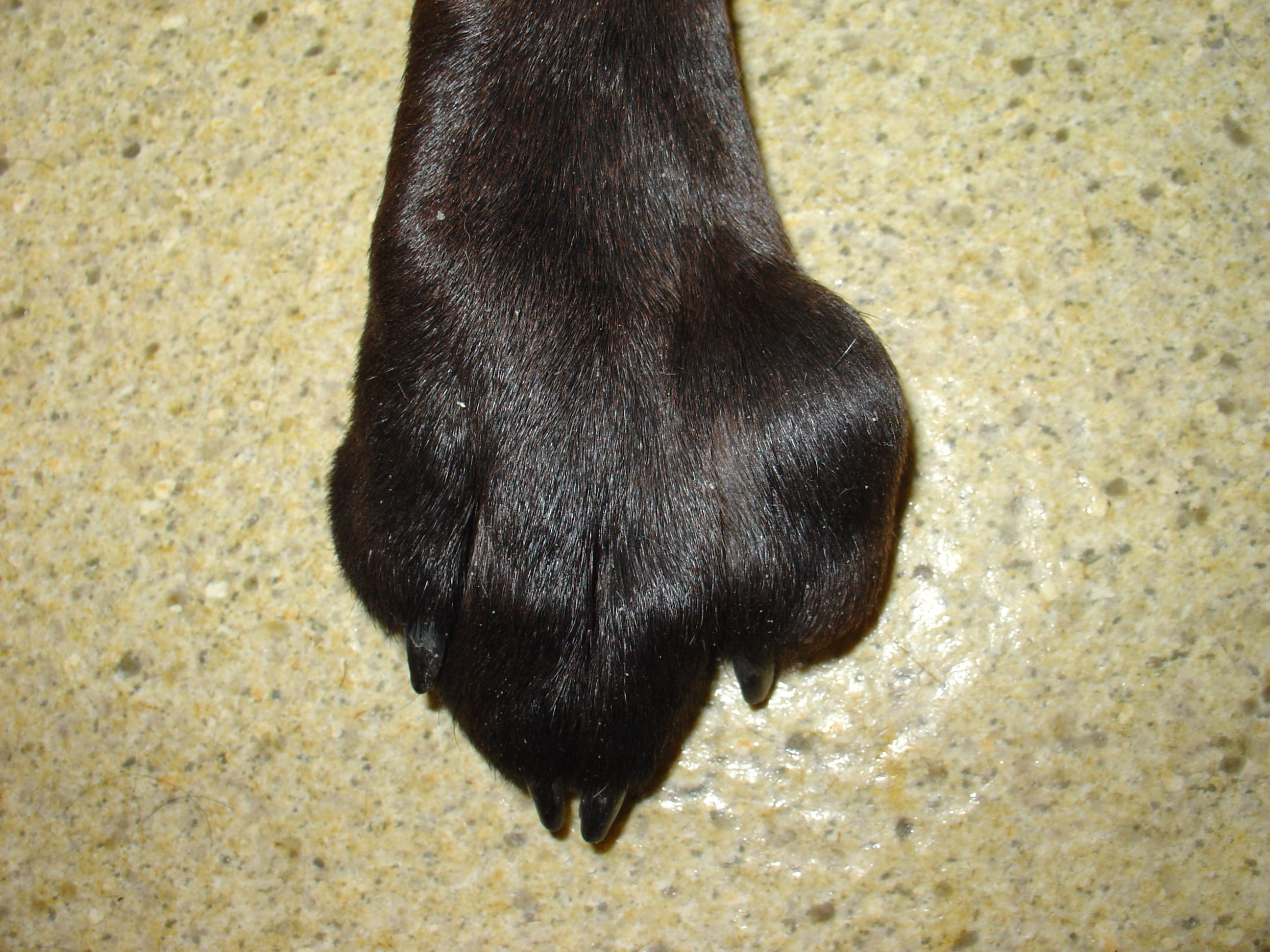
Mastocytoma on the paw in a Labrador Retriever

Mast cells are cells of the immune system that play a role in the innate immune response. They produce a number of biologically active substances, including primarily histamine. Mastocytoma account for about one-fifth of all skin tumors in dogs. They present as nodules or raised patches, and about one-fifth of affected animals have ulcers and bleeding in the stomach and duodenum. Metastasis in malignant mastocytoma occur primarily in lymph nodes, liver, spleen, and bone marrow. Any lump in the skin or subcutaneous tissue can be a mastocytoma. Detection is only possible by taking tissue with a fine needle (fine needle biopsy) followed by staining and microscopic examination (cytopathology).

Although the classifications according to the clinical appearances and cell appearance in cytodiagnostics give indications of the biological behavior (benign or malignant) and thus the prospect of cure, this tumor disease is unpredictable and should be treated at an early stage. The treatment of choice is complete surgical removal, possibly combined with radiotherapy or chemotherapy. Tumors for which surgical removal is not possible or only incompletely possible can also be treated with tyrosine kinase inhibitors.

Mastocytoma are also more common in domestic horses, ferrets, and domestic cats, but usually behave benignly in these species. In other animal species and in humans, mastocytomas are very rare.

== Mast cell ==
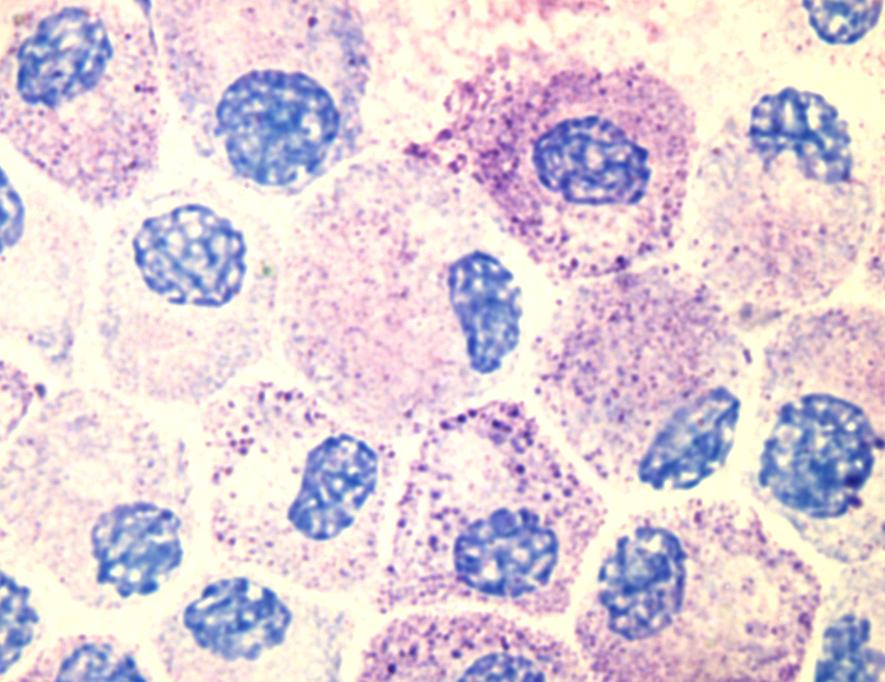
Mast cells in cell culture

Mast cells (mastocytes) are cells of the immune system and represent an important link between the innate and acquired immune response. They arise from precursor cells in the bone marrow and migrate as immature cells to many tissues, especially those in close contact with the outside world, where they differentiate.

Mature mast cells are roundish cells in connective tissue whose cytoplasm contains granules with deviating staining behavior (metachromasia). The granules are stored histamine, heparin as well as cytokines such as tumor necrosis factor-a. On the cell surface, mast cells bear binding sites (receptors), two of which are functionally most important: The stem cell factor receptor (tyrosine kinase KIT) regulates mast cell differentiation, proliferation, activation and lifespan via stem cell factor binding. The immunoglobulin receptor FcεRI (high-affinity IgE receptor) binds immunoglobulin E (IgE) with high binding strength (affinity). Not only stem cell factor, but also a number of interleukins and ultraviolet radiation lead to activation and proliferation of mast cells. When mast cells are activated, they either release inflammatory mediators, cytokines, and proteases from the granules or produce and release new ones in a short period of time.

The function of mast cells is best understood in allergies, and they are also involved in autoimmune diseases and in enhancing inflammatory responses in bacterial infections. On the other hand, mast cells may also have anti-inflammatory effects by protecting against damaging factors such as bacteria and parasites. In addition, mast cells may contribute to the development and growth of other skin tumors due to their large repertoire of biologically active substances.

== Occurrence and origin ==
Mastocytomas in dogs occur mainly in the skin and subcutaneous tissue. Very rarely, they are found in internal organs such as the small intestine, the mucosa of the mouth, the nasal mucosa or the conjunctiva. About 20% of all skin tumors and 6% of all tumors in dogs are mastocytomas. They occur more frequently in some breeds: German Boxer and related short-headed breeds, Golden Retriever, Beagle, Irish Setter, Dachshund and Bernese Mountain Dog. There is no dependence on the sex of the animal. The median age of affected dogs is eight years, but a mastocytoma can develop in dogs as young as four months old or at a very advanced age.

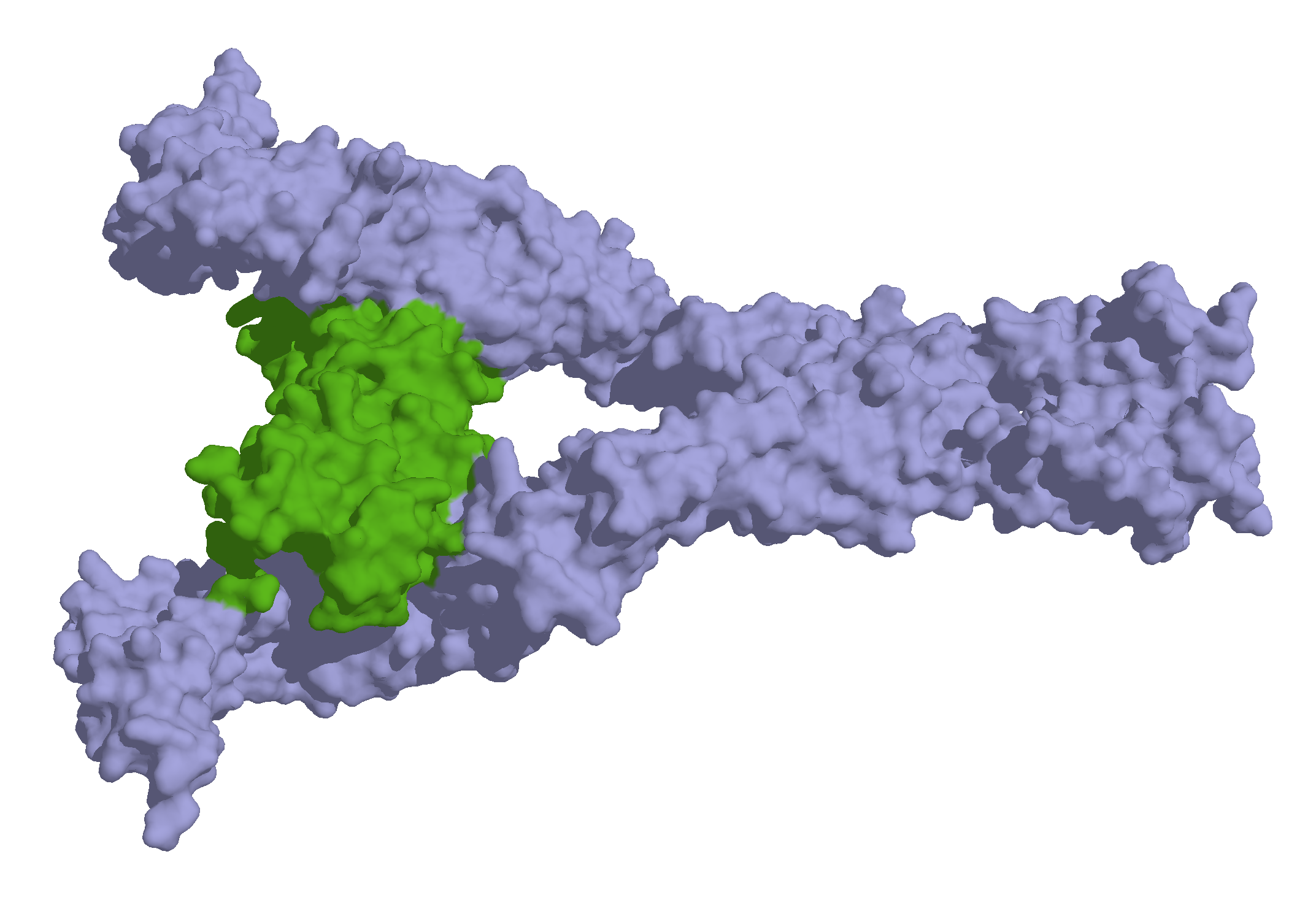
Surface model of stem cell factor receptor with bound stem cell factor (green).

In humans, a number of mutations and chromosomal alterations are known to lead to pathological proliferation of mast cells (mastocytoses). Mutations of the gene for the stem cell factor receptor (c-KIT) lead to prolonged cell life and increased formation of new mast cells. The D816V mutation is the most common of these c-KIT mutations and occurs in 80% of patients with mastocytosis. However, there are also mastocytosis patients without alterations in the stem cell factor receptor. In total, there are over 20 known chromosomal alterations in humans that can lead to mastocytosis, with chromosomes 2, 7, 12, 13, 14, and X being most commonly affected.

In dogs, c-KIT alterations also appear to play a role. Both increased gene expression and a mutation with phosphorylation of the stem cell factor receptor leading to activation without binding of the stem cell factor (ligand-independent) can occur. More than 30 such mutations are now known, the most common of which is a duplication (tandem mutation) of exon 11, which encodes the portion of the stem cell factor receptor located directly on the inside of the cell membrane (juxtamembrane domain). However, mastocytomas without c-KIT mutations also occur in dogs; in contrast to US studies, almost no relevant c-KIT mutations were even detected in mastocytomas of German dogs. Whether this was coincidental or methodological or reflects genetic differences in breeding lines needs to be clarified by further investigations. The causes for the clustered occurrence of mastocytoma in dogs are so far unexplained, presumably there are several causes (multifactorial events).

== Clinical image ==
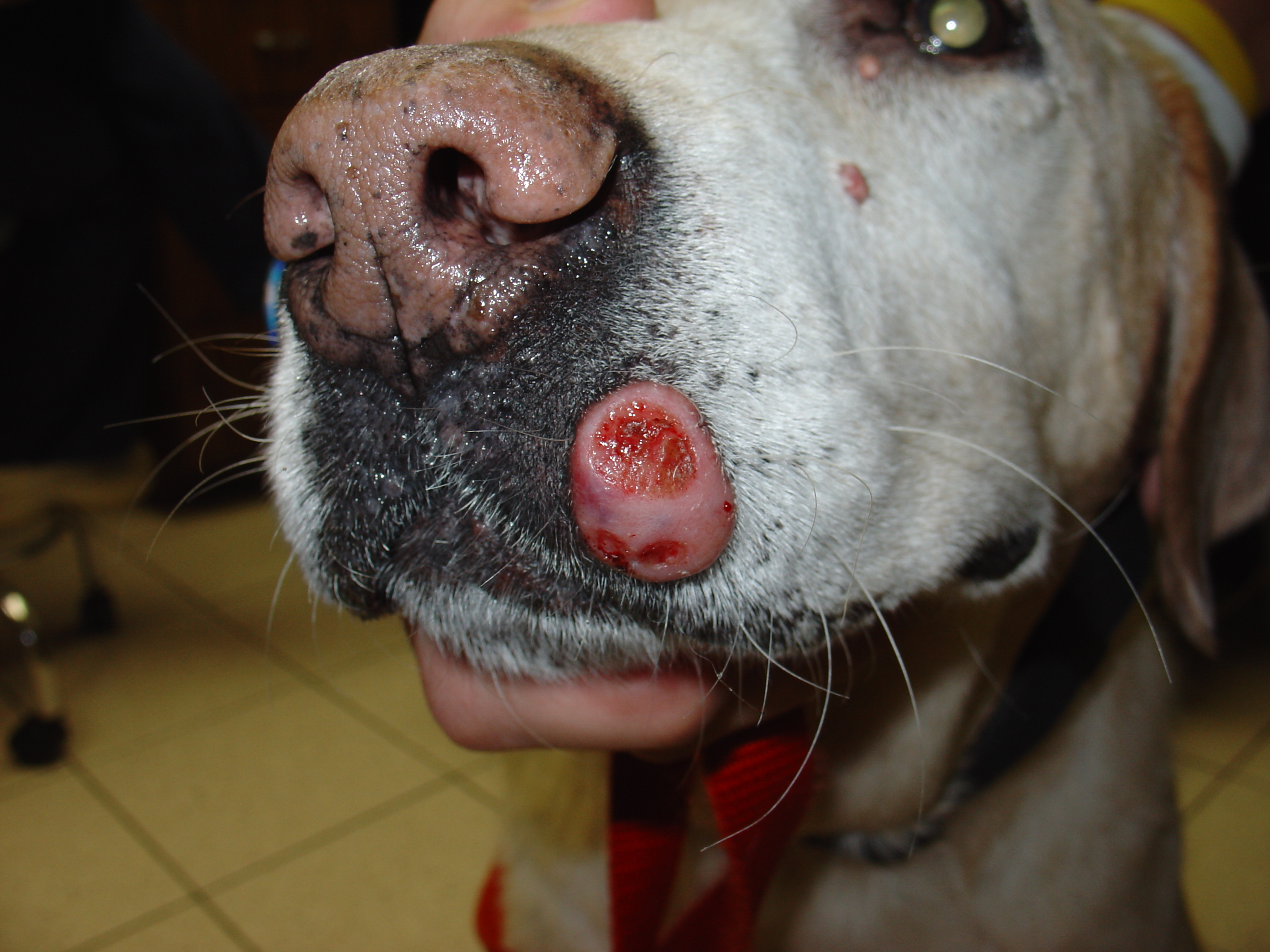
Ulcerated disintegrating mastocytoma on the chaps of a Labrador retriever

Mastocytomas of the skin present as nodules (papules), raised patches (plaques), or nodules (nodus), which may be superficially ulcerated. Their consistency ranges from soft to coarse-nodular. Locally, redness and itching may occur (Darier's sign). Occasionally, satellite nodules occur, i.e., metastasis of the tumor via lymphatic vessels into neighboring skin areas; in about 10% of cases, multiple mastocytomas are formed from the outset (primary multiplicity).

Mastocytomas can form daughter tumors (metastases) to the (regional) lymph nodes responsible for the area as well as to other organs such as the liver, spleen, and bone marrow; other locations are very rare.[9] The metastasis rate for benign mastocytomas is less than 10%; for malignant tumors, it is more than 50%.

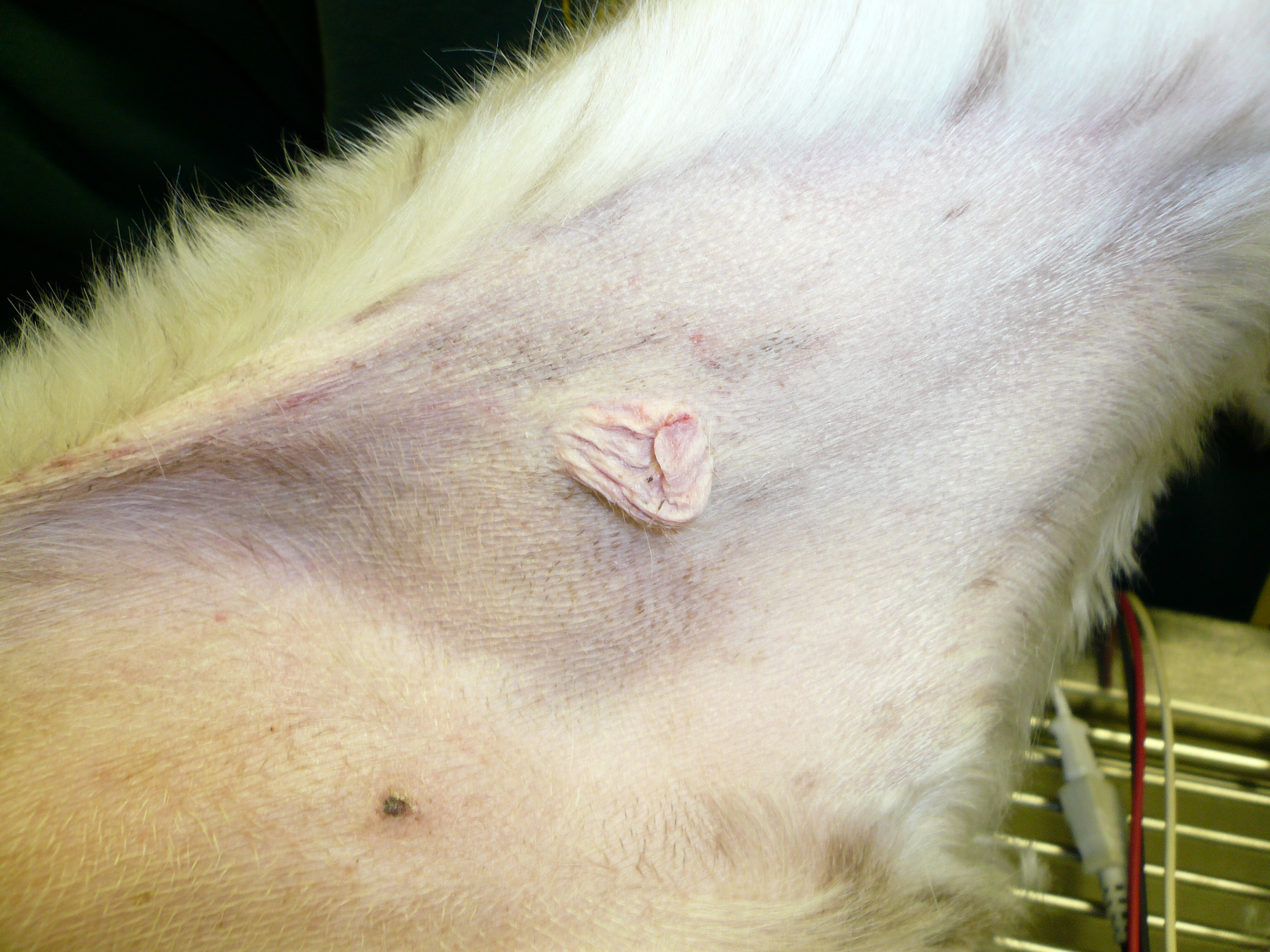
Mastocytoma on the inner thigh of a Springer Spaniel

Even without the formation of daughter tumors, a mastocytoma can trigger severe general disorders (paraneoplastic syndrome). These are triggered by the release of inflammatory mediators and cytokines. The production of heparin by the mast cells can lead to an increased tendency to bleed, and as a result of the production of fibroblast-inhibiting cytokines (especially FGF-2), to the disruption of wound healing processes. In about one fifth of the dogs with a mastocytoma, feeding instability, vomiting, tarry stools and anemia occur as a result of gastric or duodenal ulcers, in autopsies such ulcers are even detected in more than 80% of patients. About 80% of the dogs with such ulcers are euthanized due to poor general condition. In particularly severe cases, these ulcers can lead to a life-threatening gastric or intestinal rupture. In addition, a clinical picture reminiscent of a malignant disease of the hematopoietic system can occur. This systemic mastocytosis is observed mainly in animals in which a mastocytoma has previously been removed. It is accompanied by lassitude, aversion to feeding, vomiting, weight loss, pallor, and enlargement of the liver and spleen.

According to the clinical picture, mastocytomas are classified into four stages according to the criteria of the World Health Organization:

Stage 1	a tumor confined to the skin without lymph node involvement a) without general disturbances b) with general disturbances
Stage 2	a tumor confined to the skin with lymph node metastasis a) without general disturbances b) with general disturbances
Stage 3	multiple tumors or infiltrative large single tumors with or without lymph node involvement a) without general disturbances b) with general disturbances
Stage 4	Tumor with distant metastasis or recurrence with metastasis

== Diagnostics ==
A visual or palpatory diagnosis is not possible, since neither appearance nor consistency allow differentiation from other skin tumors.

The diagnostic tool of choice is fine needle biopsy, since sufficient cells can be obtained from mastocytomas. In the cytological preparation, mast cells can be distinguished relatively easily from other cell types on the basis of their granules, although certain rapid staining solutions stain mast cell granules only unreliably, and cells of poorly differentiated mastocytomas may contain very few granules.

Changes are rarely observed in the blood count; occasionally, an increase in a subtype of white blood cells (eosinophilia) may occur. In systemic mastocytosis, a decrease in white blood cells (leukopenia) often occurs. Circulating mast cells in the blood are usually not observed.

According to the histopathological cellular pattern, mastocytomas in dogs are classified into different grades. The most widely used classification of mastocytomas is based on the scheme of Patnaik and coworkers from 1984:

Tumor grade 1 (well differentiated)	well defined cell borders; round to oval, uniform cell nuclei; hardly any mitoses; granules numerous, large and well stained
Tumor grade 2 (moderately differentiated)	unclear cell boundaries; few mitoses; granules reduced in number, size and staining
Tumor grade 3 (anaplastic)	cell boundaries hardly recognizable; cell size and nuclear-cytoplasmic ratio strongly varying; many mitoses; few, small, poorly stained granules

However, a 2011 study challenges this classification. Identical specimens of 95 mastocytomas, of which the outcome of the disease was also known, were sent to 28 pathologists in 16 different institutions. While the agreement between the different investigators was 75% for grade 3 tumors, it was less than 63% for grades 1 and 2, and the predictions derived from them also showed little agreement with the outcome of the disease. Kiupel and coworkers therefore proposed a new system with only two grades: low-grade and high-grade. Tumors are judged to be high-grade (high grade, malignant) if one or more of the following criteria are met in ten fields of view at high magnification (objective 40x):

- at least seven mitoses
- at least three multinucleated cells (three or more nuclei)
- at least three abnormal nuclei (retractions, segmentation, irregular shape)
- Nucleus enlargement (karyomegaly, the nucleus diameters of 10% of mast cells vary at least twofold).

The median survival time was four months in animals with high-grade mastocytomas, whereas it was over two years in animals with low-grade mastocytomas. In addition, recurrences and metastases were significantly more frequent in high-grade mastocytomas. Furthermore, there seems to be a correlation between the type of c-KIT mutation on the one hand and the biological behavior or tumor grade on the other hand. Immunohistochemical detection of cell division markers such as Ki-67 or the argyrophilic nucleolus organizer region (AgNOR) also shows correlations with the biological behavior of mastocytomas. More than 23 Ki-67-positive cells per cm2 or more than four AgNOR per nucleus are considered to be prognostically unfavorable.

Thus, the biological behavior of mastocytomas in dogs is highly variable and only predictable to a limited extent, which is why the term mastocytoma is preferable to the terms mastocytoma (benign) and mastosarcoma (malignant) in dogs. The clinical stage, histopathological grade, c-KIT expression pattern, and cell division markers provide clues but do not allow precise conclusions. Apparently, mastocytomas in dogs are molecularly heterogeneous neoplasms. Mastocytomas in the German Boxer, one of the most commonly affected breeds, usually show a benign course. The localization of the tumor also seems to play a role. For example, mastocytomas of the toes, perineum, groin, and mucous membranes are more prone to metastasis than those of other regions. In contrast, mastocytomas of the conjunctiva are rarely prone to recurrence or metastasis, regardless of grade. Apparently, epigenetic factors, immediate environmental conditions (microenvironment), vascularization, and growth factors may influence biological behavior.

Differentially, any other skin tumor of the dog can be considered: In the skin especially histiocytomas, basaliomas, melanomas and T-cell lymphomas, in the subcutis especially lipomas, hemangiopericytomas and hemangiosarcomas. However, the differentiation of these tumors hardly causes any problems in cytodiagnostics.

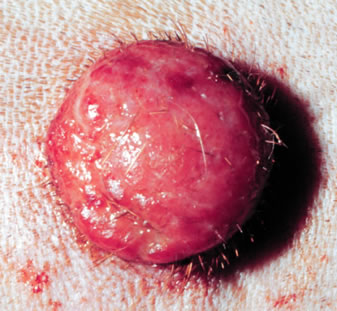
Histiocytoma

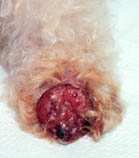
Malignant melanoma

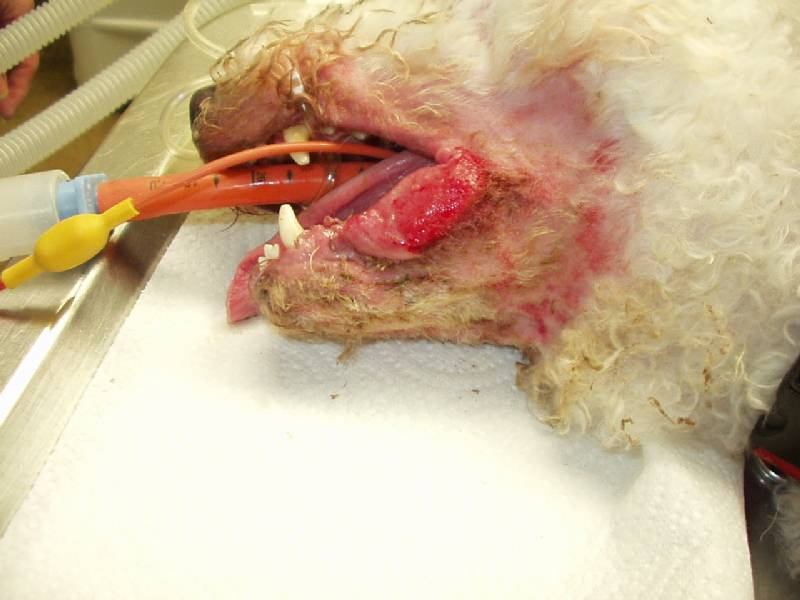
T-cell lymphoma

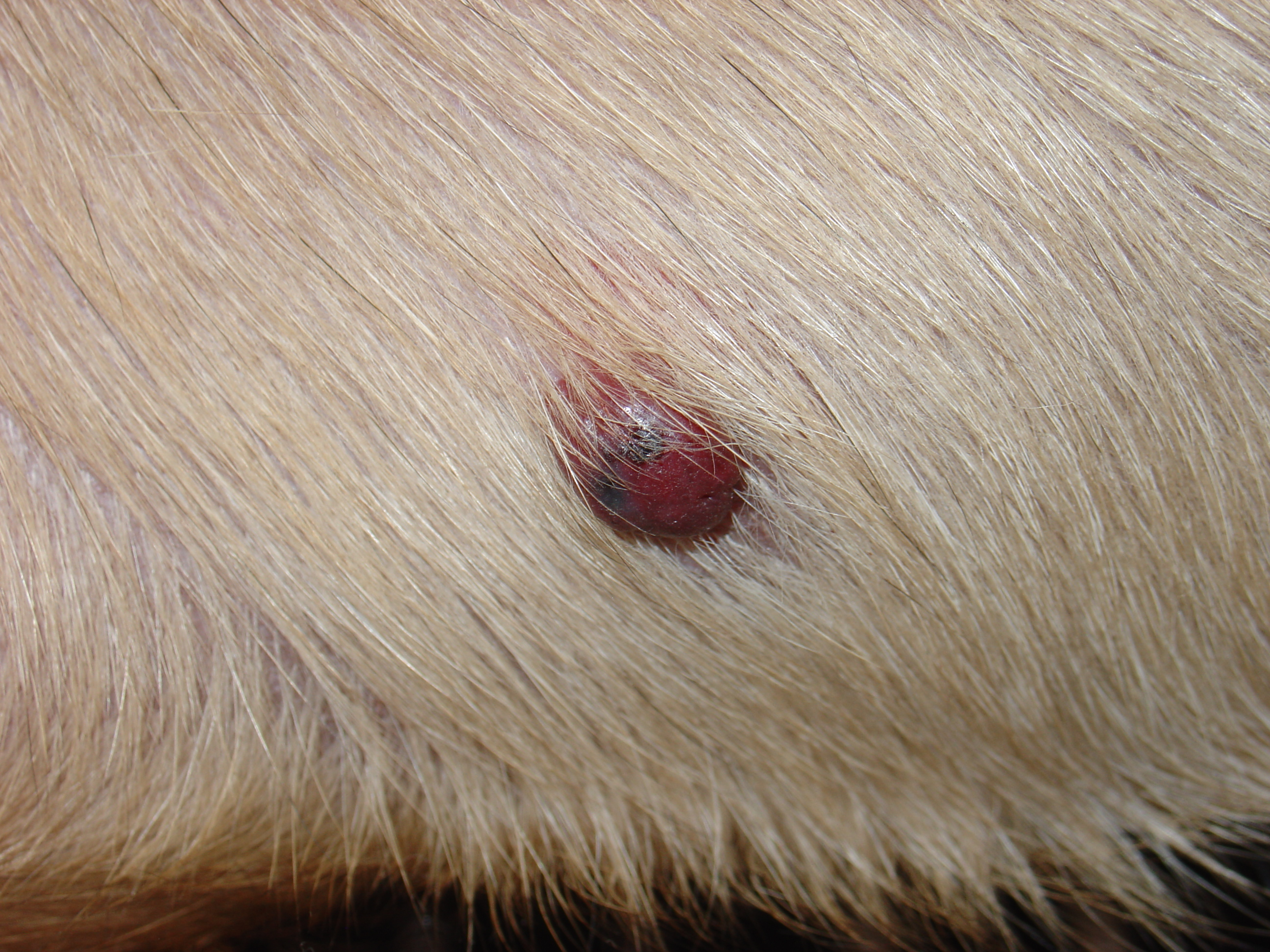
Hemangiosarcoma

== Treatment ==
Although the classifications based on clinical appearances and cellular appearance in cytodiagnostics provide clues to the biological behavior, a mastocytoma remains unpredictable and is potentially to be considered malignant. The first-line treatment method is surgical removal of the tumor at the earliest possible stage. Concomitant chemotherapy and radiation may be necessary, especially if complete removal is not possible or unsafe for anatomic reasons. For inoperable tumors, treatment with tyrosine kinase inhibitors may be attempted. In general, the prospect of cure is best in well-differentiated mastocytomas (low-grade or grade 1) and in animals without general signs (substages a). Young dogs (<1 year of age) also have a better prognosis than older dogs.

=== Surgery ===
Surgical removal (resection) should be performed as early as possible, i.e. before lymph nodes or even other organs are affected (stage 1). Mastocytomas have a pseudocapsule of compressed tumor cells and usually fine extensions into the surrounding tissue that extend beyond the palpable tumor tissue. For this reason, a safe distance of about 3 cm beyond the palpable margin is recommended. Removal is performed, even in the case of mastocytomas in the subcutaneous tissue, with the entire skin and in depth, including the subcutaneous fascia. On the limbs, it can be difficult to close the resulting skin defect, so skin grafting may also be necessary. Biopsies should be taken from the margins and the remaining tissue in depth (tumor bed) to check for the presence of residual tumor tissue.

Particularly on the limbs, these basic tumor surgery rules cannot always be fully implemented because this would result in the loss of nerves, vessels and tendons, so that amputation must also be considered. In some circumstances, the use of H₁- and H₂-receptor antagonists prior to surgery may attempt to reduce tumor size. The administration of these agents is also indicated in cases of incomplete excision to reduce the number of tumor cells (cytoreductive resection), as the procedure may lead to degranulation of mast cells and consequent release of inflammatory factors.

For well-differentiated mastocytomas smaller than 5 cm, the prospect of cure (prognosis) is very good with proper surgical excision, but poor for recurrence. Therefore, planning the surgical approach at the time of initial surgery is crucial. For tumors smaller than 2.5 cm, survival is very high, even for high-grade tumors.

=== Radiotherapy ===
Radiation therapy is mainly used as an adjuvant therapy for mastocytomas that cannot be completely removed and is considered the treatment of choice. Mast cells are very sensitive to ionizing radiation. For grade 2 mastocytomas, various studies show freedom from disease after one year in about 95% of patients, and between the second and fifth year after treatment in about 90% of patients. For grade 3 tumors without lymph node involvement, the one-year survival rate in one study was 71%. Radiation therapy can also be used as a neoadjuvant or palliative treatment, as it usually leads to significant shrinkage of the tumor. A study of brachytherapy for grade 2 and 3 tumors after surgical excision also showed good success and good tolerability.

=== Chemotherapy ===
Various agents are used for chemotherapy. Glucocorticoids have a direct inhibitory effect on the proliferation of mast cells. Direct injection into the tumor is no longer recommended, but systemic administration is often combined with the administration of cytostatic drugs. The cytostatic agents used are vinca alkaloids such as vinblastine, cyclophosphamide, hydroxycarbamide, doxorubicin, mitoxantrone, and L-asparaginase, although combinations of different agents are more promising. According to the 2012 European consensus paper, chemotherapy is always indicated when the tumor has already spread throughout the body or when neither reoperation nor radiation are possible in cases of incomplete surgical removal.

Hydroxycarbamide responded in 28% of treated dogs in one study, and 4% (two animals) showed complete cure (complete remission). Side effects were primarily blood count changes such as anemia and neutropenia. The combination of hydroxycarbamide with prednisolone in incompletely removed grade 2 tumors resulted in death from liver failure in two cases; of the remaining dogs, all survived the first year and 77% survived the second year. With the combination of hydroxycarbamide, vinblastine, and prednisolone, a response rate of 65% was achieved in unremovable or incompletely removable mastocytomas, and the median survival time was significantly higher in grade 2 than in grade 3 tumors (954 versus 190 days). Side effects (neutropenia, increase in liver enzymes) were moderate.

=== Tyrosine kinase inhibitors ===
In the meantime, with the tyrosine kinase inhibitors, there are active substances that act specifically on the stem cell receptor of the mast cells. Since 2009, two tyrosine kinase inhibitors - masitinib (trade name Masivet) and toceranib (trade name Palladia) - have been approved for the treatment of mastocytomas in dogs in the EU.

Masitinib is approved for the treatment of unresectable grade 2 and 3 (or high-grade) mastocytomas with c-KIT mutation. Side effects are primarily vomiting, diarrhea, neutropenia, anemia, and proteinuria, but most are mild. Median survival increased from 75 to 118 days in a study of dogs with grade 2 and 3 tumors without metastases, and to 253 days when the agent was used for initial treatment.

Toceranib has multiple targets (multitarget drug): It acts not only at the stem cell receptor but also at the vascular (VEGF) and platelet-derived growth factor (PDGF) receptors, making it applicable to mastocytomas without a c-KIT mutation. Side effects are similar to those of masitinib, but occur very frequently and are severe in over one-third of animals.

There is also positive experience with the tyrosine kinase inhibitor imatinib, which is approved for human medicine.

=== Stelfonta (tigilanol tiglate injection) ===
In 2020, FDA approved a non-surgical treatment called STELFONTA (tigilanol tiglate injection) for the treatment of all grades of non-metastatic mast cell tumors. Injected directly into the tumor, Stelfonta has a targeted mode of action to destroy mast cell tumors, evident within hours. Stelfonta activates protein kinase C and causes necrosis of tumor cells by damaging blood vessels.

Post marketing data mirrors the pivotal study, achieving a 75% complete response rate with a single injection, or 88% with up to two injections. 89% of dogs have no tumor recurrence at the site of Stelfonta treatment at 12 months.

Stelfonta is also approved for treatment of canine mast cell tumors by the EMA, VMD, APVMA and Swissmedic. The treatment is accompanied by the administration of an antihistamine, a corticosteroid, and an analgesic.

== Mastocytomas of other species ==
=== Mastocytomas in humans ===
An abnormal proliferation of mast cells is called mastocytosis in human medicine. The increased storage of

Classification according to ICD-10
C94.3	Mast cell leukemia
C96.2	Malignant mastocytomas Malignant mastocytosis
Q82.2	congenital mastocytosis Urticaria pigmentosa
ICD-10 online (WHO version 2019)

mast cells in the skin (cutaneous mastocytosis) is a rare disease with an incidence of less than ten new cases per 1 million population. The most common form of these skin mastocytoses is the benign urticaria pigmentosa ("pigmented nettle rash"). In about 20% of young children, other organs are also affected, and in adults, the figures vary between 40% and 90%.

Isolated mastocytomas as in dogs, on the other hand, are very rare in humans. Benign mastocytomas (mastocytoma, mast cell nevus) usually develop in young children under two years of age and appear as single or multiple, reddish or reddish-brown raised spots or nodules of the skin. In response to mechanical stimuli or spontaneously, they may swell like hives (Darier's sign) and cause itching. There is no tendency for degeneration or involvement of other organs. Mastocytomas usually regress without treatment, but this may take years. Malignant mastocytomas (mast cell sarcomas) are extremely rare in humans[46] and are controversial as a disease entity in their own right.

=== Mastocytomas in other animal species ===
Mastocytomas are also relatively common in horses, cats, and ferrets, although less so than in dogs. In the domestic horse, they occur primarily in older animals in the head and neck region and lower limb sections. The recurrence rate is low with proper surgical removal. In the domestic cat, mastocytomas of the skin are mostly benign. Histologic grading, as in the dog, has not been shown to be useful. Surgical excision is also the treatment of choice in the cat, in combination with radiation if resection is incomplete. If numerous mastocytomas occur, palliative treatment with glucocorticoids may also be attempted. A special form of mastocytoma occurs in Siamese cats. Here, the mast cells resemble histiocytes and collections of lymphocytes and eosinophilic granulocytes are interspersed in the tumor. In older cats, mastocytomas occasionally occur in the small intestine and can lead to intestinal intussusception or perforation and exhibit aggressive biological behavior. In ferrets, mastocytomas account for approximately 16% of skin tumors, but also usually behave benignly.

In other mammals, mastocytomas are very rare. There are single case reports in domestic cattle, domestic donkeys, domestic pigs, llamas, Richardson's gopher, hamsters and African hedgehogs. In mice, spontaneous mastocytomas are very rare, but the mouse mast tumor cell line P 815 is widely used in research.

In birds and reptiles, mastocytomas are very rare; isolated cases have been described in the domestic chicken, the chain snake, and a Galápagos giant tortoise.

== Bibliography ==
- Martin Kessler: Kleintieronkologie: Diagnose und Therapie von Tumorerkrankungen bei Hunden und Katzen. 2. Auflage, Parey Verlag, Stuttgart 2005, ISBN 978-3-8304-4103-8, pp. 210–215.
- Martin Kessler: Mastzelltumoren, Mastozytom (Mastzellsarkom). In: Hans Georg Niemand, Peter F. Suter (Hrsg.): Praktikum der Hundeklinik. 10. Auflage, Parey Verlag, Stuttgart 2006, ISBN 978-3-8304-4141-0, pp. 1135–1136.
- Anthony S. Stannard und L. Thoma Pulley: Mastocytoma of the dog. In: Jack E. Moulton (Hrsg.): Tumors in domestic animals. 2. Auflage, University of California Press, Berkeley [u. a.] 1978, ISBN 0-520-02386-2, pp. 26–31.
- C. Guillermo Couto: Mast cell tumors in dogs and cats. In: Richard W. Nelson und C. Guillermo Couto (Hrsg.): Small animal internal medicine. 3. Auflage, Mosby, St. Louis 2003, ISBN 0-323-01724-X, pp. 1146–1149.
- 55. Österreichische Apotheker-Verlagsgesellschaft m.b.H: Austria-Codex Schnellhilfe 2016/17. Druckerei Berger, Horn 2016, p. 1015, ISBN 978-3-85200-244-6
