= Dietary indiscretion =

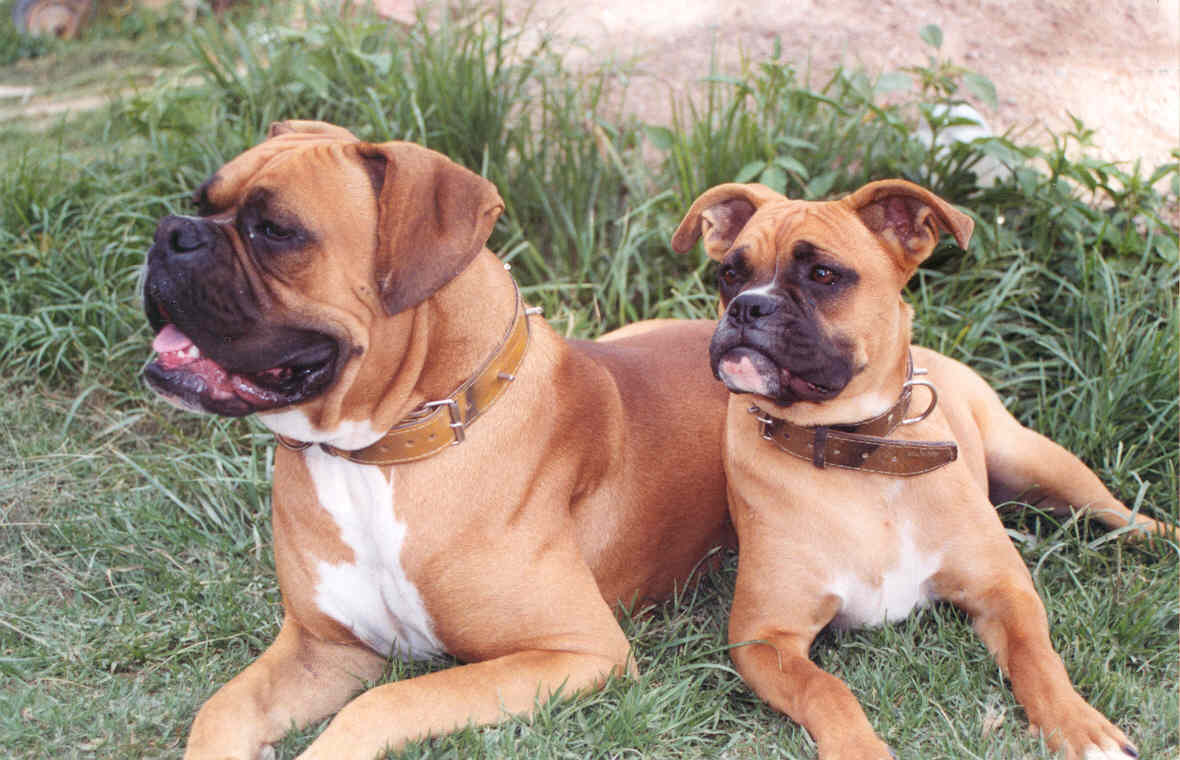
Domesticated dogs are among the animals that most often display dietary indiscretion, due to their close contact with humans.

Dietary indiscretion is the tendency for certain animals to feed on unusual items, or undergo drastic changes in feeding behaviour. The unusual items can include non-foodstuffs, such as garbage or foreign objects, or foodstuffs that are not normally consumed by the animal. The changes in feeding behaviour can include the ingestion of spoiled or raw food, or consuming abnormally large quantities of food. Dietary indiscretion is relatively uncommon in humans, but is especially prevalent in domesticated animals, such as dogs, as a result of their close contact with their human owners.

== In humans ==
Dietary indiscretion is relatively uncommon in humans, except for people with certain psychological disorders.

=== Eating disorders ===
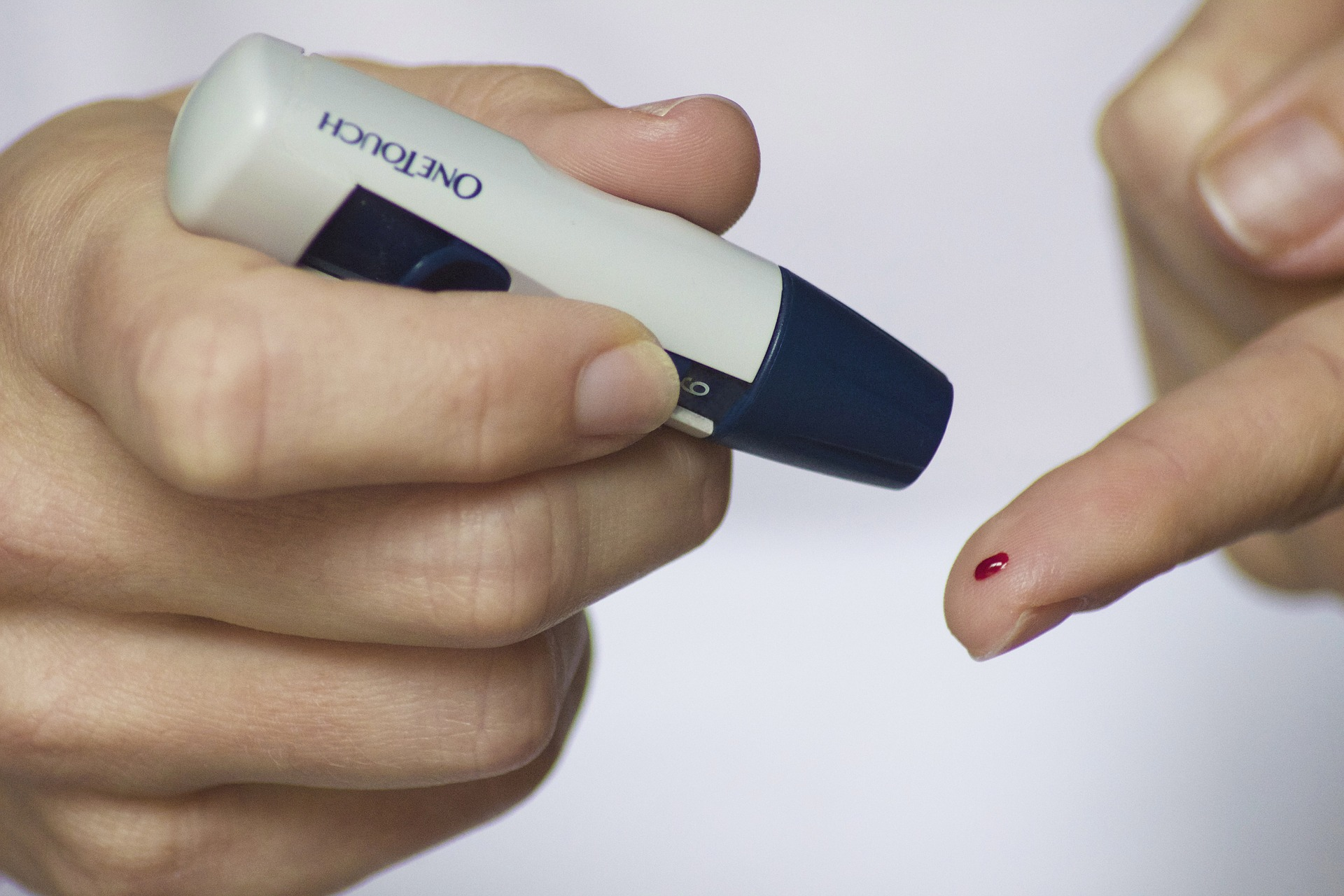
In individuals with diabetes, dietary indiscretion refers to eating foods that are not doctor-recommended.

Certain eating disorders, such as binge-eating disorder and bulimia nervosa, involve compulsions to engage in episodes of binge eating. According to the Diagnostic and Statistical Manual of Mental Disorders, a binge involves an episode of dietary indiscretion, where an abnormally large amount of food is consumed in a short period, and the individual feels that they do not have control over the amount they are eating. Dietary indiscretion is also characteristic of another eating disorder known as pica, which is characterized by an appetite for non-nutritive substances, such as paper, cloth, and soil.

=== Diabetes ===
The phrase "dietary indiscretion" is sometimes used by endocrinologists when discussing patients with diabetes mellitus. In particular, individuals with type 2 diabetes should avoid certain dietary items, including sugar-sweetened beverages, saturated and trans fats, and starches, such as white rice. When doctors are treating patients with diabetes, dietary indiscretion refers to the patient not following the dietary recommendations, and consuming foods that can potentially exacerbate the effects of their diabetes. For example, in a case study by J.S. Baird of Columbia University, when a patient presents to the hospital with diabetic ketoacidosis, the first step for physicians is to determine whether or not the patient had performed dietary indiscretion, which could be a potential cause of the ketoacidosis.

== Other animals ==
Dietary indiscretion frequently occurs in domesticated animals, especially in dogs. Dietary indiscretion involving the consumption of human food by domesticated dogs can be harmful and can result in conditions including acute inflammation of the pancreas (pancreatitis) and acute gastritis. In addition to these conditions, dietary indiscretion can be harmful to animals if non-digestible items, such as bones, are consumed. These items cannot be digested, and as such they often become lodged in the intestinal tract, causing severe, often life-threatening, digestive distress.

If the animal consumes a substance that is contaminated with bacteria or other toxic substances, garbage toxicosis, or "garbage gut", can result. Garbage toxicosis involves the bacteria (or other toxic substances) entering the digestive system, resulting in the production of toxins by the bloodstream. In dogs, garbage toxicosis results in symptoms similar to those in humans with gastroenteritis. These can include:

- bloody or watery diarrhea
- projectile vomiting
- abdominal pain and swelling
- fever
- lack of energy
- dehydration

Garbage toxicosis can generally be diagnosed by veterinarians based on symptoms and physical examination. Occasionally, further tests, such as blood and stool samples, X-rays, and other diagnostic assays are used to confirm the diagnosis.
