= Dog camp =

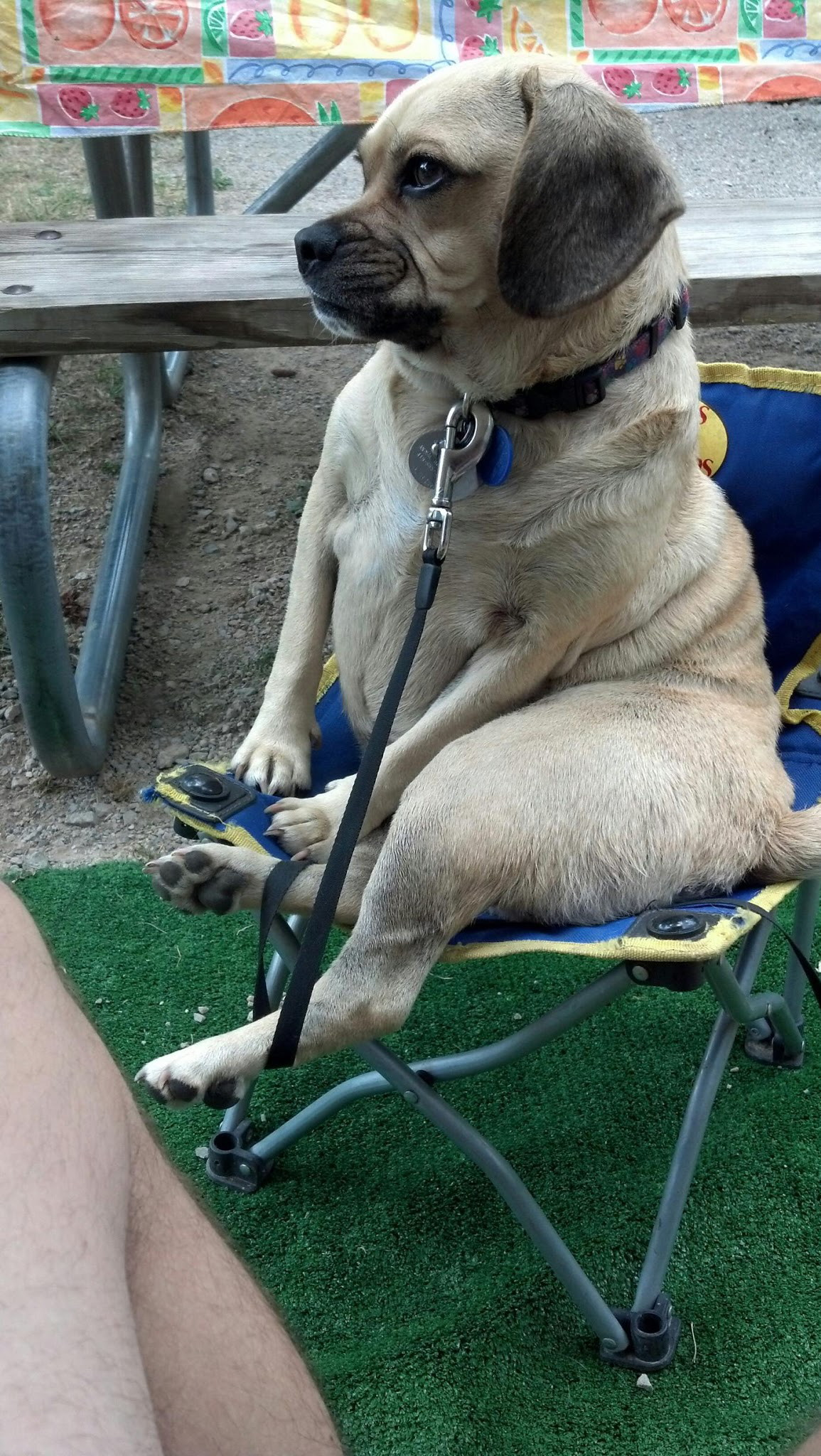
Camping dog

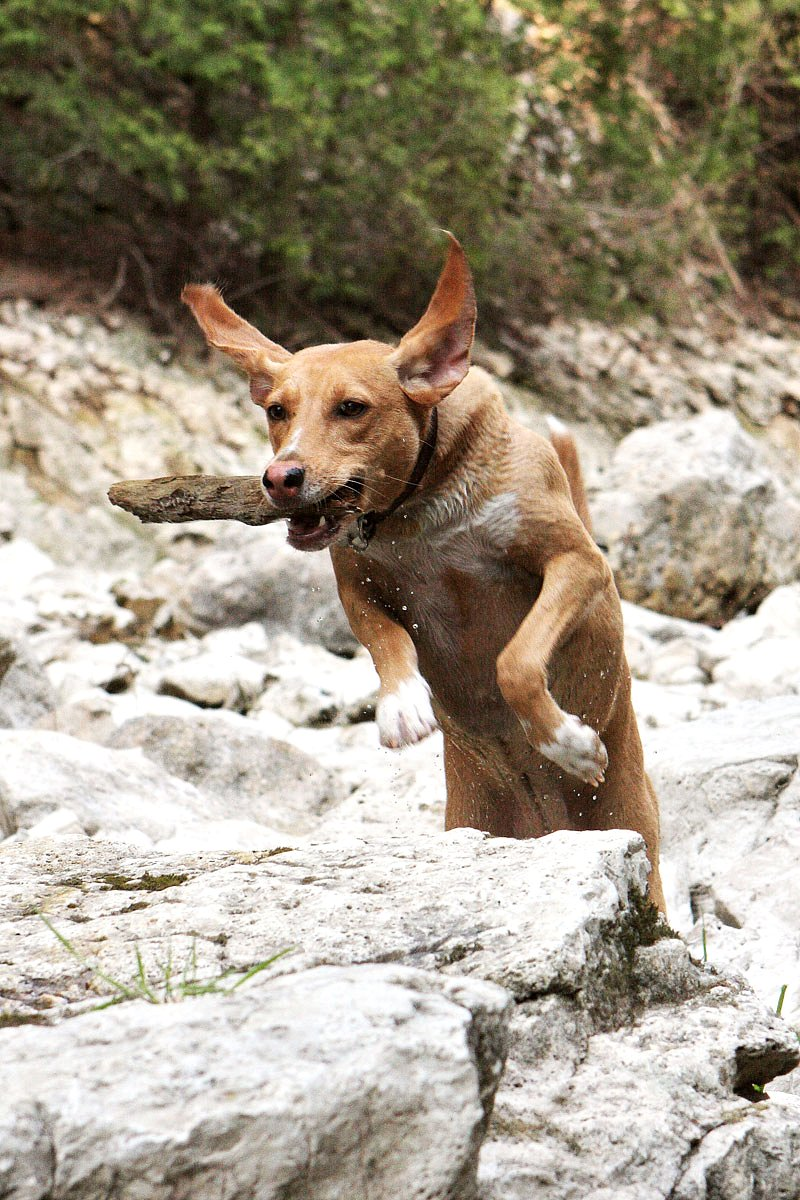
Dog camps may include leash-free exercise and play

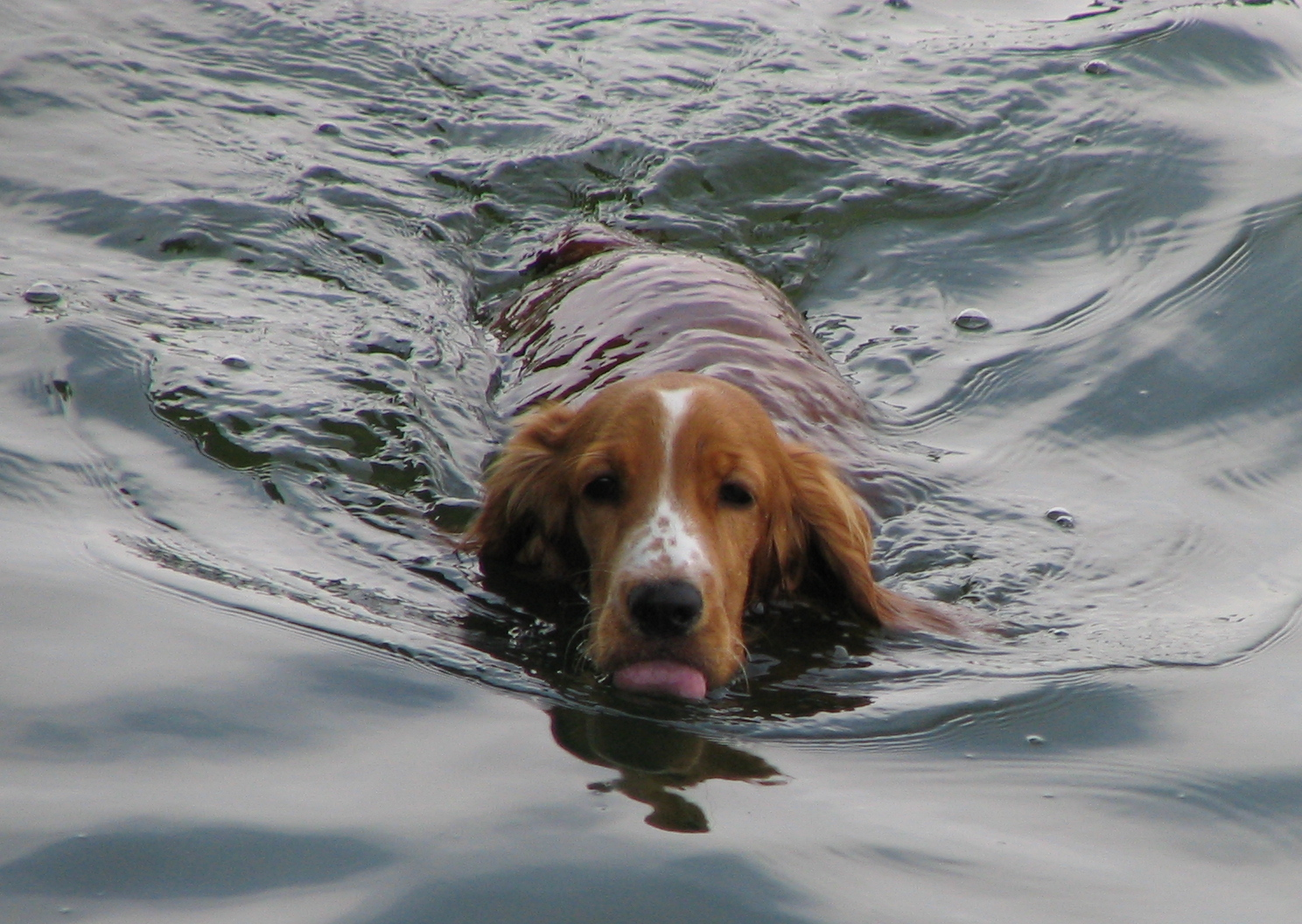
Many dog camps are located near lakes to facilitate swimming

Dog camp is a form of vacation for owners accompanied by their dogs with dog-centric activities ranging from casual recreational playtime to serious obedience or sport training. In many dog camps dogs can play and socialize throughout the day while supervised by their owners. Some of the activities at a dog camp might include running, fetching balls or frisbees, chasing other dogs, tug of war, socializing amongst playmates, and lessons.

== Dog Scout camp ==
Dog Scouts of America, modelled after Boy Scouts and Girl Scouts, offers several camps in addition to their regular programs throughout the year where dogs earn merit badges for achievements. At camp, owners and their dogs convene in a woodsy camp setting for a week, lodging in RVs, tents or cabins. There are numerous dog activities including swimming, canoeing, dock diving, agility, backpacking, hiking, freestyle dancing, bonfires and talent shows. Some of the activities cater only to the humans. Dogs are awarded their badges or titles in a ceremony at the end of the camp week. There are over 100 badges that dogs and their owners can earn. Clicker training and positive reinforcement are the standard forms of training taught at DSA camps. DSA also offers weekend workshops for those who cannot attend a weeklong camp.

== Doggie boot camp ==
A doggie boot camp is an intensive program of training away from home with the owner being present to handle the dog, rather than the sending a dog off to "board and train" at the trainer's location without the owner. Some dogs which are fearful or nervous do not cope well being handled by a stranger and do better with this method of being handled by the owner with a trainer present. The owner and dog get daily one-on-one training. Dogs may be taught anything from manners and basic obedience to dealing with behavioral problems that need attention from an experienced trainer. Boot camps are not recommended for dogs with serious aggression problems because such a dog needs one-on-one training with an experienced trainer and there is a risk factor to being around other dogs and strangers. Boot camps also typically incorporate social activities for the humans.
