= Dog wheelchair =

Device to aid mobility of dogs

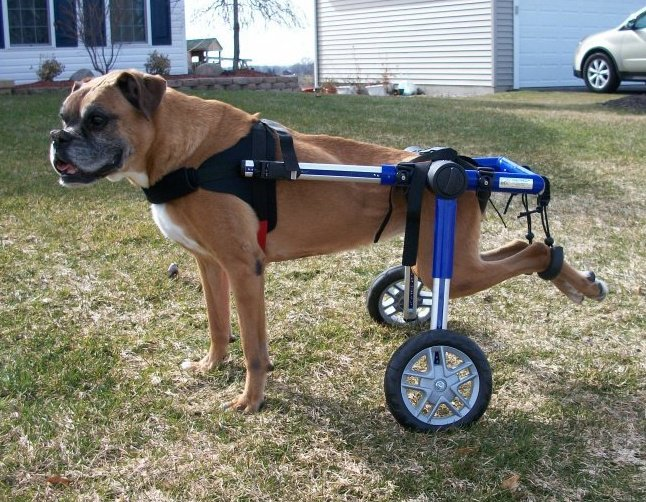
A disabled Boxer using a wheelchair to help it walk

Dog wheelchairs are assistive devices designed to help dogs with mobility issues, whether due to permanent or temporary conditions. They allow pets to maintain independence and continue engaging in social and physical activities, which may reduce stress and secondary health complications associated with immobility. These devices are commonly recommended by veterinarians and are increasingly available in both rehabilitation settings and consumer markets.

== History and invention ==
Dog wheelchairs, and other types of pet wheelchairs, are a modern progression of historical assistive devices made for pets. The use of prostheses for animals initially emerged in bovine agriculture and gradually extended to pets, coinciding with more widespread pet keeping. By the late Victorian era, veterinary practice was established for beloved pets to be fitted with various prostheses, including splints, artificial limbs, false teeth, and glass eyes. Dog wheelchairs as we recognize them today were invented in the 1960s.

The modern dog wheelchair was pioneered by Dr. Lincoln “Nick” Parkes, a Navy Air Corps veteran and founder of K-9 Karts Company. Parkes earned his veterinary degree in 1957 and completed one of the first internships offered by the University of Pennsylvania School of Veterinary Medicine. After practicing for a few years in Colorado, he joined the Animal Medical Center (AMC) in New York City, where he specialized in neurologic and orthopedic surgery. Dr. Parkes developed the first animal wheelchair prototype in 1961, after owners of partially paralyzed pets frequently asked if there was a way for their animals to get around on their own. He fashioned a simple wheelchair from metal bars and four wheels, which served as an early prototype for his K-9 Karts. Over the years, he developed improved models that prioritized usability and comfort.

Advances in materials and design, including adjustable frames and lightweight components, have contributed to the increased availability and effectiveness of dog wheelchairs in modern veterinary practice. Recent innovations include lightweight aluminum frames, modular designs for easy adjustment, and 3D-printed components tailored to individual dogs. Most dog wheelchairs are manufactured to meet custom measurements, but mass-market wheelchairs have been produced for a variety of sizes of dogs since 2008 by the company Walkin' Wheels.

== Types ==
Wheelchairs designed for pets enable mobility, and can alleviate discomfort and improve quality of life. The appropriate wheelchair depends on the dog's size, condition, and mobility needs. Proper fitting is crucial to avoid discomfort or injury. Ill-fitting wheelchairs may cause chafing wounds or exacerbate existing conditions.

- Rear-support wheelchairs assist dogs with rear limb weakness or paralysis. They assist with conditions like severe hip dysplasia.
- Front-support wheelchairs are available for dogs with weakness in their front legs. These devices are typically triangular-shaped, featuring a singular wheel in the front and two in the back.
- Quad-support wheelchairs are designed for dogs with quadriplegia, meaning they experience a lack of mobility in all four legs.

== See also ==
- Cerebellar hypoplasia
- Animal locomotion
- Category:Gait abnormalities
