= Veterinary prosthesis =

Prosthetic devices for animals

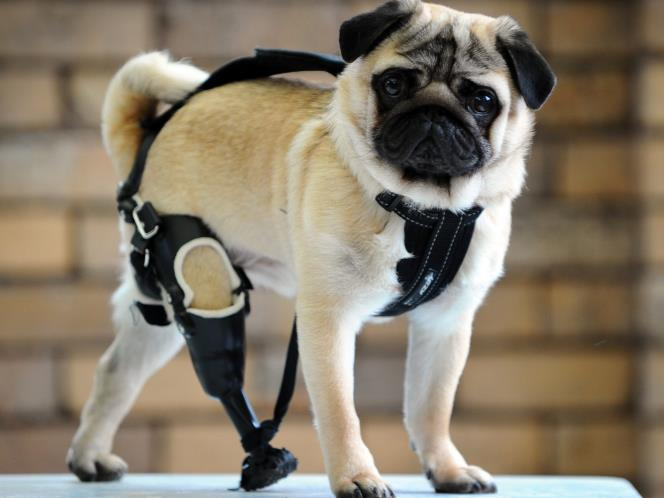
A Pug with a prosthetic hind leg

A veterinary prosthesis is a medical device that takes the place of an absent body part for an animal. These devices are created with the intention of mimicking the body part to serve the same purpose and functionality. The design of new animal prosthesis is driven by the needs of individual animals in consideration with environmental requirements and attachment sites.

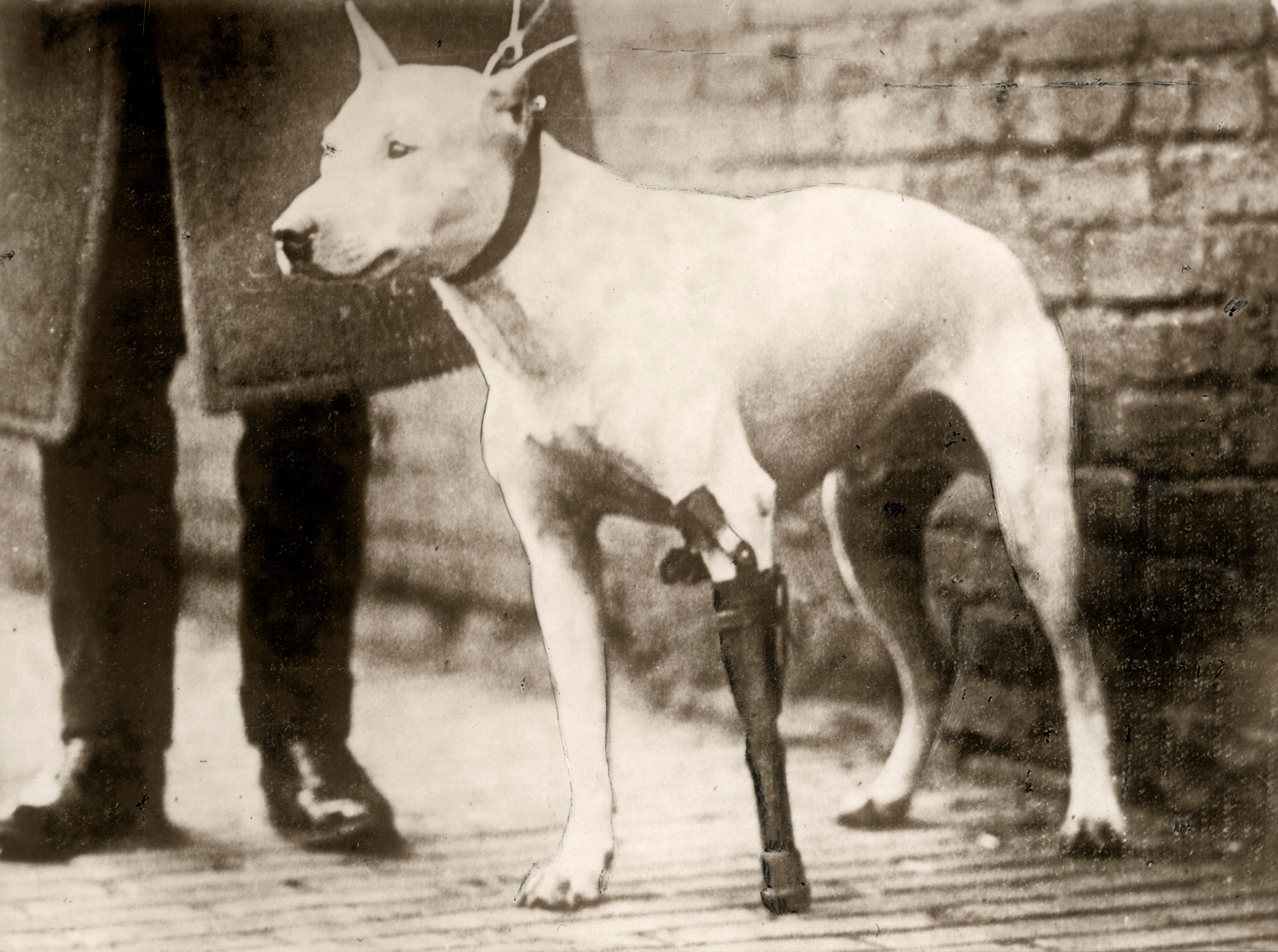
A Bull Terrier with a prosthetic leg (1924)

== Timeline ==
=== 2000s ===
==== 2000 ====
Petsthetics is a Southwest Florida-based company that seeks to improve the quality of life of pets in need of prosthetic devices. With the primary goals of pain reduction, support, and the improvement of mobility, Petsthetics was founded by Prosthetist and Orthotist Peter DiPaolo, who has over 15 years of experience in Human Orthotics & Prosthetics. DiPaolo gained recognition following the treatment of Rosie, a Great Dane puppy who had received an amputation after suffering a broken foot. After Rosie was fitted with a prosthetic leg, she was adopted as a service dog by Maja Kazazic, a survivor of a grenade attack who had also lost her leg.

==== 2003 ====
OrthoPets is a company founded in 2003 that provides custom prosthesis for pets. Primarily treating dogs, OrthoPets provide prosthetic devices starting at $1976. The process, lasting approximately 15 days in its entirety, begins with an online order. After the kit is received, the pet owner is able to create a fiberglass impression of their pet's limb. Once the used kit is sent back to OrthoPets with necessary medical information, the impression is converted into a digital 3D model that is carved to suit the patient. Upon the design's completion, the 3D model is vacuum formed, then fitted with straps and padding. Janet Van Dyke, affiliate faculty of Colorado State University in the College of Veterinary Medicine and Biomedical Sciences and President of the Veterinary Orthopedic Society (VOS), commends the "tremendous clinical experience" of OrthoPets and notes that their care extends to zoo animals and is not restricted to household pets.

==== 2005 ====
Beauty, a bald eagle who had been shot in the beak by a poacher, was found in 2005 attempting to find food in an Alaskan landfill. Beauty was initially moved to a recovery facility Anchorage, Alaska, before Janie Veltkamp, a raptor biologist, transported Beauty to Birds of Prey Northwest, a raptor center based in Idaho. With the collective contributions from Veltkamp, mechanical engineer Nate Calvin, veterinarians, and dentists, a 3D-printed beak was created for Beauty. The prosthetic beak, which required hundreds of hours to design, allowed for Beauty to regain the ability to eat and drink.

==== 2006 ====
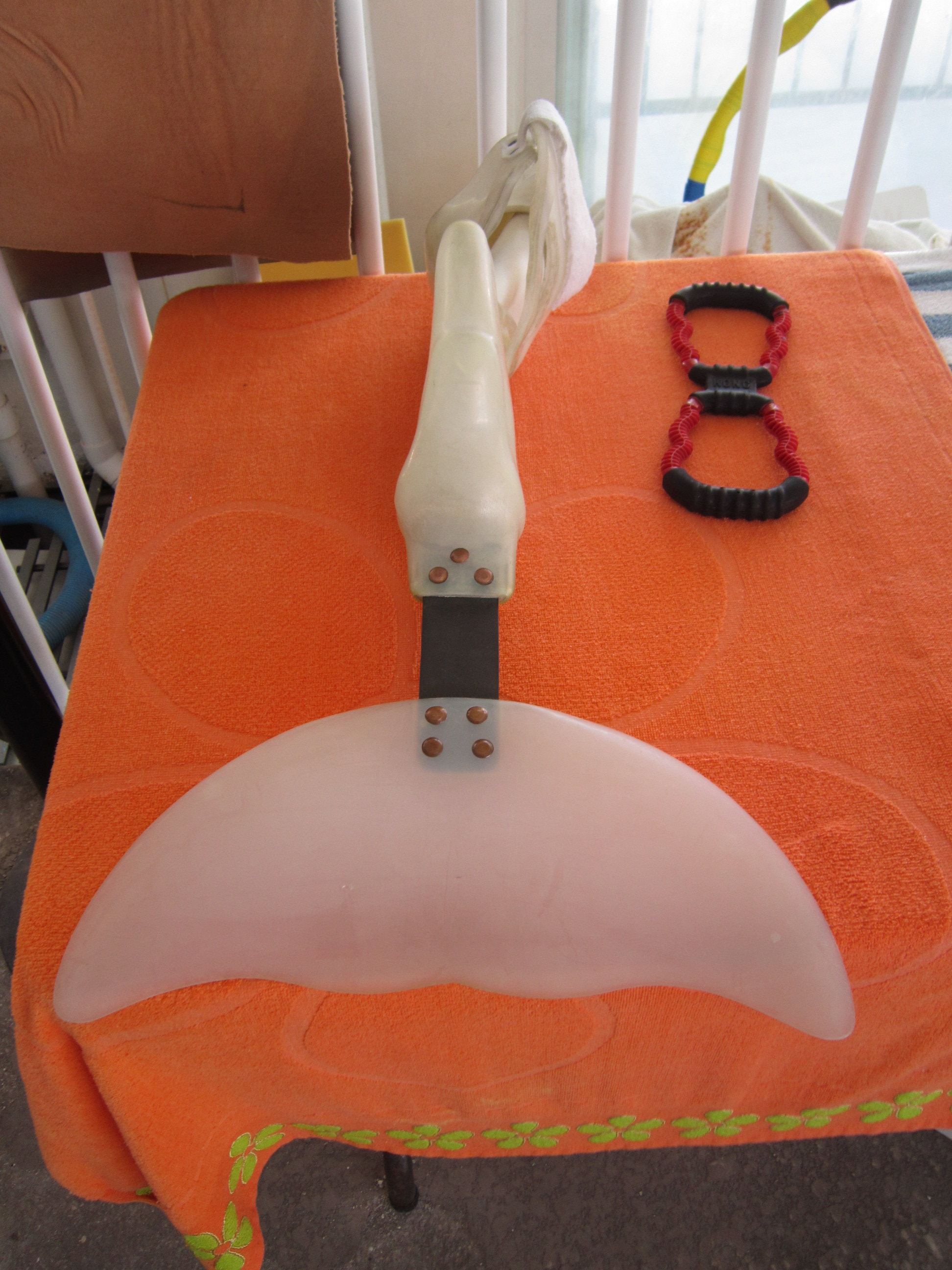
Winter's prosthetic tail

Winter, a bottlenose dolphin, was discovered in 2005 in Mosquito Lagoon, Florida, tangled in a crab trap fishing line. She was recovered and rehabilitated with the aid of the Clearwater Marine Aquarium (CMA). Due to a lack of blood flow caused by the crab trap line, "Winter's tail had virtually melted away, lost to necrosis, or cell death." In 2006, prosthetist and Hanger Clinic's Vice President of Lower Extremity Prosthetics, Kevin Carroll, proposed a prosthetic tail for Winter. During the research and design process, considerations were made regarding Winter's spinal movements, her aquatic environment, and her jumps above the water's surface. To keep the tail's position steady, the gel liner WintersGel was developed. WintersGel is made using silicone, intending to provide comfort while avoiding skin irritation. The suction property of the liner allowed the tail to remain firmly attached to Winter. WintersGel has also been used to treat humans who have prosthetic devices. Winter's prosthetic tail was used primarily for physical therapy since she had taught herself to swim without her tail.

==== 2007 ====
Chhouk, a male Asian elephant, was first rescued in 2007 after being located in a Cambodian forest. Not even a year old, Chhouk received urgent care after he had lost a foot to a poacher's snare. The treatment of the life-threatening wound involved a lower-leg amputation, completed at the Phnom Tamao Wildlife Rescue Center. The Cambodian School of Prosthetics and Orthotics (CSPO) later created a prosthesis that allowed for Chhouk's normal movement capabilities to be restored. Chhouk receives new prosthetic devices on an ongoing basis as he grows larger and wears out the prosthetic foot.

==== 2008 ====
In 2008, Yu Chan (a female loggerhead turtle) was found tangled in the net of a Japanese fisherman. She had sustained injuries to her flippers, missing portions of two flippers. The Sea Turtle Association of Japan and Kawamura Gishi, a manufacturer of prostheses, helped to design prosthetic flippers for Yu Chan, which fit to the loggerhead through the assistance of a vest. Yu Chan's swimming capacity, which was reduced to 60% upon being rescued, was restored and she was able to swim with no observable problems.

=== 2010s ===
Mr. Stubbs, an American alligator, received a tail prosthesis.

== Current research ==
The goals for animal prosthesis involve discovering low cost and comfortable solutions. New solutions continue to be developed based on the unique circumstances of the animals. Research about these prosthetic devices is also present in higher education such as Bucknell University. Engineering students Emma O’Shea, Grace Adams, and Will Carcieri completed two semesters researching animal prosthesis and designing a 3D-printed prosthetic leg for Doug, a golden retriever dog. A primary concern during this research involved inaccessibility due to cost, which supports further research to address this issue.
