= Boxer cardiomyopathy =

Disease primarily affecting Boxer dogs

Boxer cardiomyopathy (also known as "Boxer arrhythmogenic right ventricular cardiomyopathy") is a disease of the myocardium primarily affecting Boxer dogs. It is characterized by the development of ventricular tachyarrhythmias, resulting in syncope and sudden cardiac death. Myocardial failure and congestive heart failure are uncommon manifestations of the disease.

== Overview ==
Boxer cardiomyopathy shares striking similarities to a human myocardial disease called arrhythmogenic right ventricular cardiomyopathy (ARVC). On histopathology, the disease is characterized by the progressive replacement of ventricular myocardium (primarily right ventricular myocardium) with fatty or fibro-fatty tissue. Clinically, the disease is characterized by the development of ventricular tachyarrhythmias, including ventricular tachycardia and ventricular fibrillation. Affected dogs are at risk of syncope and sudden cardiac death.

== Cause ==
Boxer cardiomyopathy is a genetic disease inherited in an autosomal dominant pattern. The presentation in affected offspring is quite variable, suggesting incomplete penetrance. In 2009, a group led by Dr. Kathryn Meurs at Washington State University announced that they had identified one genetic anomaly associated with Boxer cardiomyopathy but as of 2012 there is still debate over the significance of the discovery.

== Clinical presentation ==
Boxer cardiomyopathy is an adult-onset disease with three distinct clinical presentations:

The concealed form is characterized by an asymptomatic dog with premature ventricular contractions (PVCs).

The overt form is characterized by ventricular tachyarrhythmias and syncope. Dogs with overt disease may also have episodic weakness and exercise intolerance, but syncope is the predominant manifestation.

The third form, which is recognized much less frequently, is characterized by myocardial systolic dysfunction. This may result in left-sided, right-sided, or bi-ventricular congestive heart failure. It is not known if this form represents a separate clinical entity, or whether it is part of the continuum of disease.

== Sudden cardiac death ==
All dogs with Boxer cardiomyopathy are at risk of sudden cardiac death. This includes asymptomatic dogs, meaning that sudden death may be the first sign of disease.

Sudden cardiac death is usually caused by the degeneration of ventricular tachycardia to ventricular fibrillation. Unless terminated promptly by defibrillation, death usually occurs within minutes.

== Diagnosis ==
Physical examination The physical examination is often unremarkable, although an arrhythmia characterized by premature beats may be detected.

Electrocardiogram: An ECG often shows premature ventricular complexes (PVCs). These typically have an upright morphology on lead II (left bundle branch morphology). This occurs as the ectopic impulses usually arise in the right ventricle. In some case, the ECG may be normal. This is due to the intermittent nature of ventricular arrhythmias, and means that the diagnosis should not be excluded on the basis of a normal ECG.

Holter monitor: A Holter monitor allows for 24-hour ambulatory ECG monitoring. It facilitates quantification of the frequency and severity of ventricular ectopy, and is important in the management of affected dogs. Boxer breeders are encouraged to Holter their breeding stock annually to screen out affected dogs.

Genetic test: A genetic test for Boxer cardiomyopathy is now commercially available. The genetic test is not yet accepted as a definitive test and additional diagnostic testing continues to be essential to characterize the phenotype, and to help direct therapeutic interventions.

Echocardiogram: Echocardiography is recommended to determine if structural heart disease is present. A small percentage of dogs have evidence of myocardial systolic dysfunction, and this may affect the long-term prognosis.

== Treatment ==
Current treatment options for Boxer cardiomyopathy are largely restricted to the use of oral anti-arrhythmic medications. The aim of therapy is to minimize ventricular ectopy, eliminate syncopal episodes, and prevent sudden cardiac death. A number of medications have been used for this purpose, including atenolol, procainamide, sotalol, mexiletine, and amiodarone. Combinations can also be used. Sotalol is probably the most commonly used antiarrhythmic at this time. It has been demonstrated that sotalol alone, or a combination of mexiletine and atenolol, results in a reduction in the frequency and complexity of ventricular ectopy. It is likely that these medications also reduce syncopal episodes, and it is hoped this extends to a reduced risk of sudden death. Consequently, antiarrhythmic therapy is typically recommended by veterinary cardiologists for Boxer dogs with ARVC. Although relatively rare, oral antiarrhythmic medications may be proarrhythmic in some dogs; consequently, appropriate monitoring and follow-up is recommended.

The ideal therapy for Boxer cardiomyopathy would be implantation of an implantable cardioverter-defibrillator (ICD). This has been attempted in a limited number of dogs. Unfortunately, ICDs are programmed for humans and the algorithms used are not appropriate for dogs, increasing the risk of inappropriate shocks. In the future, reprogramming of ICDs may allow them to emerge as a viable option in the treatment for Boxer cardiomyopathy.
