= Fawn (colour) =

Yellowish tan colour

Common connotations
- Dog coat

Colour coordinates
- Hex triplet: #E5AA70
- sRGB^{B} (r, g, b): (229, 170, 112)
- HSV (h, s, v): (30°, 51%, 90%)
- CIELCh_{uv} (L, C, h): (74, 63, 46°)
- Source: X11
- ISCC–NBS descriptor: Moderate orange yellow
- B: Normalized to [0–255] (byte)

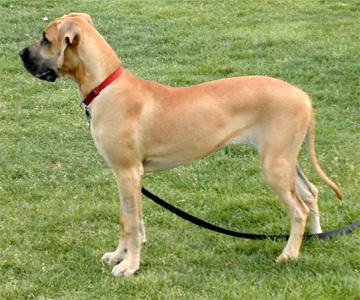
A fawn Great Dane.

Fawn is a light yellowish tan colour. It is usually used in reference to clothing, soft furnishings and bedding, as well as to a dog's coat colour. It occurs in varying shades, ranging between pale tan to pale fawn to dark deer-red. The first recorded use of fawn as a colour name in English was in 1789.

== Fawn in dog breeds ==
The fawn coat colour is found in many breeds, such as Boxers, Great Danes, Pugs, and in the crossbreed Puggles. Genetically, in most cases the colour is due to the recessive a^{y} gene at the Agouti locus. Some breeds, such as Chows and Doberman Pinschers use the term "fawn" to describe a red dog (at the Eumelanin locus) that carries a copy of the dilution gene; in Dobermans this colour is more commonly called "Isabella".

== See also ==
- List of colours
- Amber (color)
- Buff (color)
