= Canine hydrotherapy =

Form of physical therapy for dogs

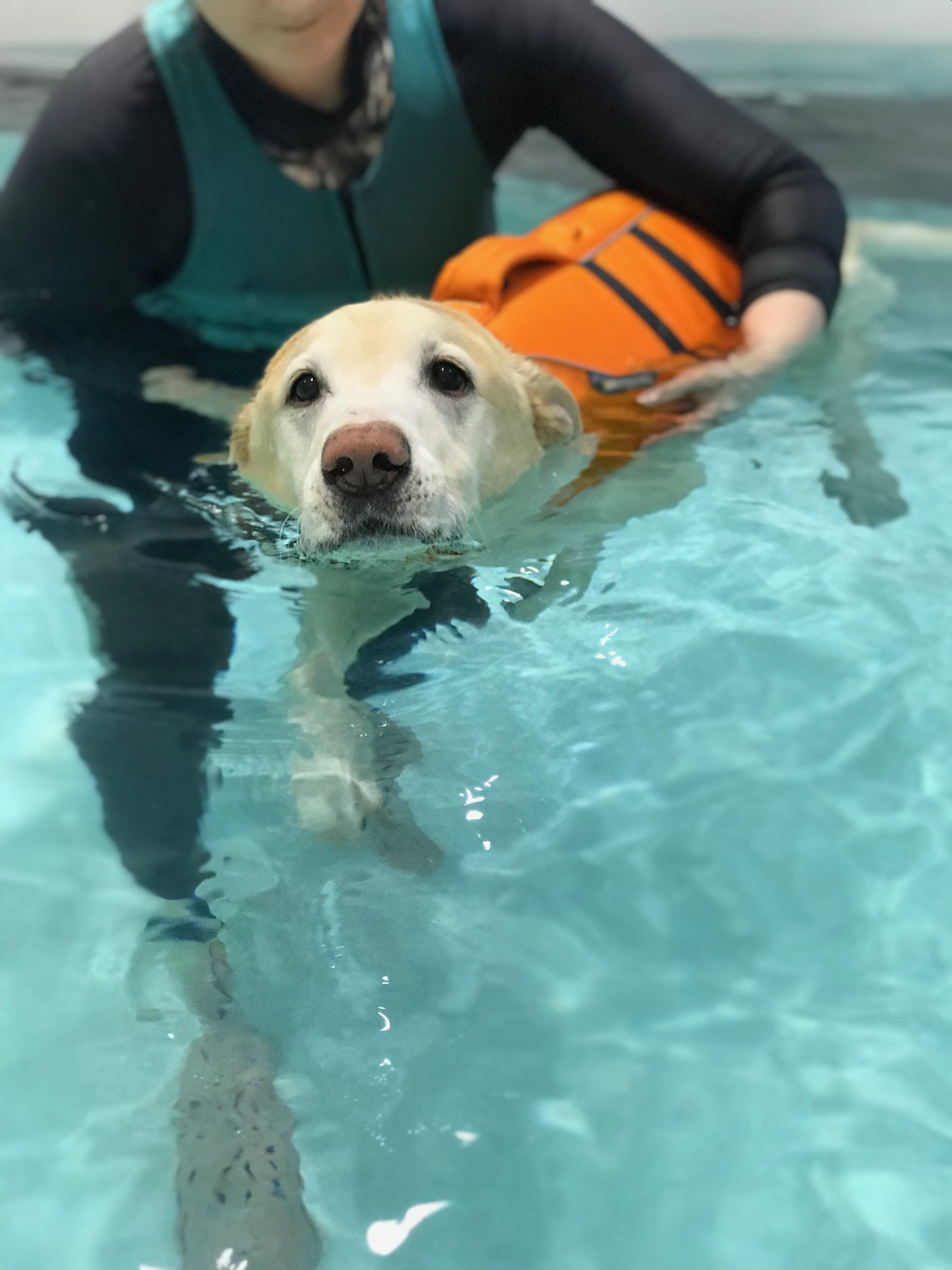
A yellow Labrador Retriever undergoing hydrotherapy.

Canine hydrotherapy is a form of hydrotherapy directed at the treatment of chronic conditions, post-operative recovery, and pre-operative or general fitness in dogs.It assist dogs in recovering from injuries, managing chronic conditions like arthritis, and improving cardiovascular fitness.

== Background ==
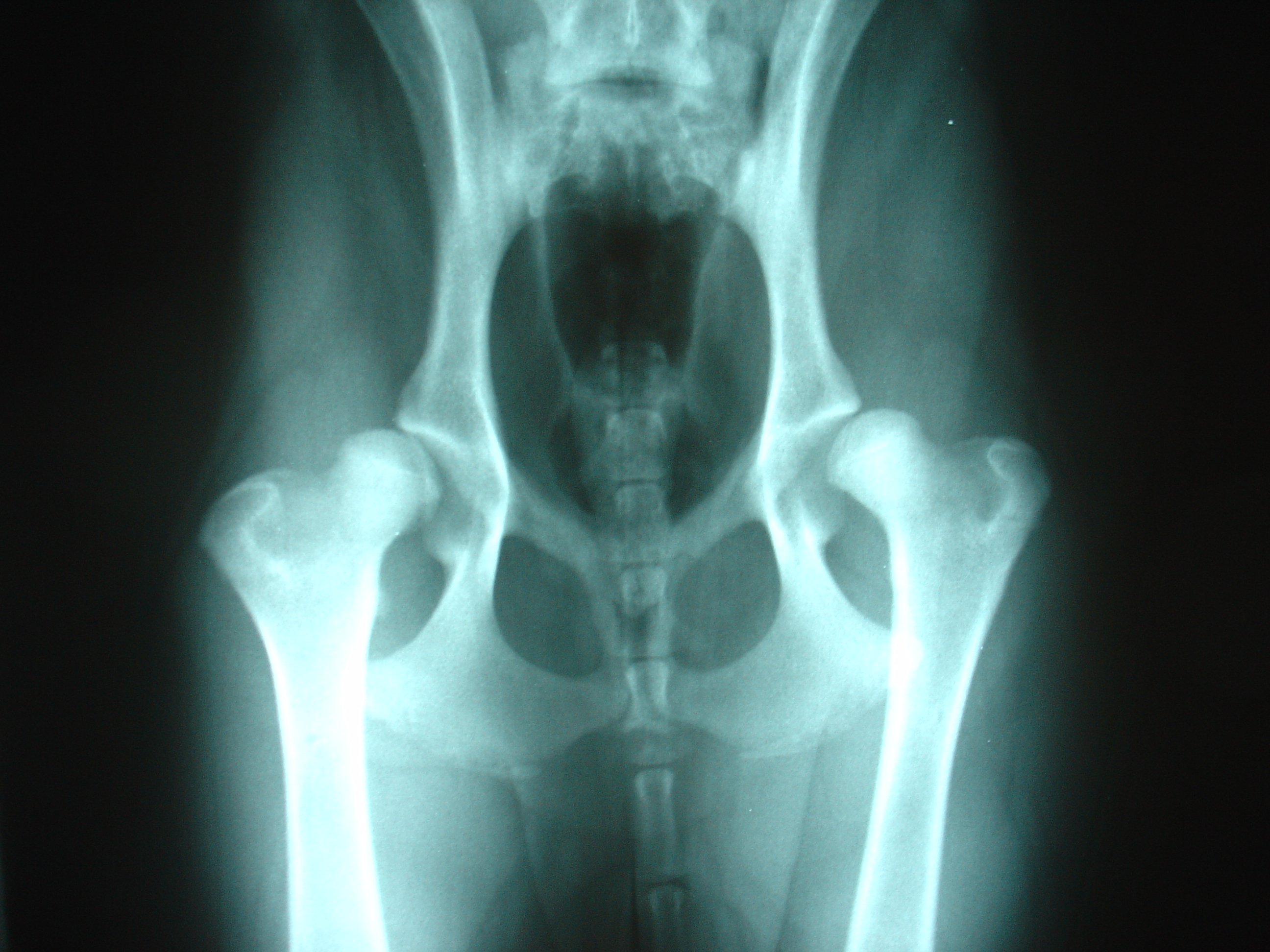
Hip dysplasia may be helped by hydrotherapy.

A number of conditions in dogs may be aggravated by or may show slow or no improvement as a result of weight bearing exercise. Among these are hip dysplasia and osteochondritis dissecans (OCD), conditions most common in medium to large purebred dogs, such as German Shepherds, Labrador Retrievers or Golden Retrievers; chronic degenerative radiculomyelopathy (CDRM), a degenerative disease of the spinal cord which causes hind limb problems in German Shepherds; and luxating patella which is seen predominantly in small and toy breeds.

Injuries to the cruciate ligament or other ligaments may make post-operative weight-bearing exercise in dogs problematic. Obese dogs, while requiring exercise, may aggravate existing conditions or injure themselves due to the weight exerted on their joints if walked normally.

== History ==
Hydrotherapy for humans has been used since ancient times, and some attempt at formalizing treatment was made during the 18th century. Similarly, the benefits of seawater for the treatment and prevention of leg injuries in horses has been known for centuries. Because of the financial benefits surrounding the treatment of race horses, around the mid-19th century, inventors began to produce devices to replicate the benefits of cold seawater immersion for horses.

The greyhound racing industry eventually recognized the benefits of the equine treatment, and in the UK was brought to the forefront by a specialized canine hydrotherapy pool. From there, the therapy was extended to dogs in general. This had led to the development of underwater treadmills to relieve stress on the animal's joints whilst building strength. These have been a turning point in the rehabilitation of dogs as they can be placed in smaller areas, but offer a controlled treatment.

== Pool design ==
Pool designs for canine hydrotherapy vary, but most have generic elements. The pool tends to be smaller than a human swimming pool and is heated. (This is unlike equine hydrotherapy pools. Horses generate a lot of body heat when swimming, so equine pools use cold water to prevent the animal overheating.) A dog's muscles benefit from the warming effects of the heated water. Most pools have a ramp for entry and exit, and some have harnesses to maintain the dog in position in the water. There may be a manual or electric hoist for lifting dogs in and out of the water. Water is chlorinated or treated with an alternative chemical. Some have jets to add resistance and make the dog swim more strongly.

== Uses ==
A blind 16-year-old poodle swimming in a kitchen sink for exercise during the COVID-19 pandemic lockdown

As an alternative or complement to weight-bearing exercise and medication, canine hydrotherapy may speed recovery after operations or slow the progression of degenerative conditions. It may be used as a pre-operative fitness regime to allow a dog to maintain condition before an operation if it can not exercise normally. When a congenital condition is identified in a puppy, it may be the case that surgery is not possible until the animal is physically mature; during the period preceding the surgery, hydrotherapy can be employed to maintain the dog's condition.

Spinal injuries or surgery can cause impairment of motor function, which may be treated by allowing the dog to exercise in water; it provides support and allows the dog to exercise its muscles while nerve regeneration is taking place. Degenerative conditions can make normal weight bearing exercise difficult and pressure on joints and limbs may aggravate some conditions, so hydrotherapy can be used in these cases to allow the dog to exercise in an environment where there is no pressure on the affected areas.

Obese dogs can build fitness and lose weight as a result of exercise in a hydrotherapy pool without putting excessive weight on their joints. Hydrotherapy may be used as part of a general fitness routine for dogs.
