= Maja Kazazic =

Bosnian genocide survivor and speaker

- Born: Mostar
- Occupation(s): Businesswoman, genocide survivor, motivational speaker

Maja Kazazic (born May 14, 1977) is a Bosnian genocide survivor, businesswoman, and motivational speaker. She was critically injured during the Bosnian War in 1993, losing her left leg and suffering severe injuries.

== Biography ==
Kazazic was born in Bosnia to Mugdim Kazazic and Azra Kazazic. The family lived a normal life until the early 1990s when the political situation shifted and war broke out.

In the 1990s, a genocide occurred in Bosnia. Kazazic resided in the city of Mostar with her family. About 60,000 residents were expelled to the city's left side by the forces of Croatia and Serbia. The forces opened fire at them while herding them with firearms across the bridges. The residents were left stranded, surrounded by two armies, without food, water, electricity, medical supplies, or communication with the outside world as soon as forces bombed all the bridges.

Kazazic was 16 years old when a rocket-propelled grenade exploded, killing five of her friends and leaving her the only survivor in Bosnia two years into the war as she and her friends were hanging out in the courtyard of her building. Kazazic received care in a nearby makeshift hospital located in a basement that was devoid of medical equipment and antibiotics. Her left leg developed an infection, and over the course of a few months, the flesh was gradually removed from it until it had to be amputated.

Kazazic was taken to Frankfurt, Germany, by British relief worker Sally Becker after two months, where she received the treatment she required to survive. Veterans for Peace transferred Kazazic to a hospital in Cumberland, Maryland in the United States in September 1993 as part of their Children of War Rescue Project. She started training to walk with a prosthetic.

Kazazic earned a BA in Psychology from St. Francis University and became a certified Empathy Life Coach and Amputee Peer Counselor. She moved to the Gulf Coast of Florida following her graduation and started working as a web analyst for an insurance brokerage.

Kazazic developed post-traumatic stress disorder as a result of the tragedy experiencing panic episodes that occasionally rendered her unable to function. Kazazic adopted Rosie, an amputee Great Dane, at her clinician's advice. Hanger Clinic provided the prosthetic limb for Rosie. Maja adopted Rosie in September 2015.
