= Boxer (dog breed) =

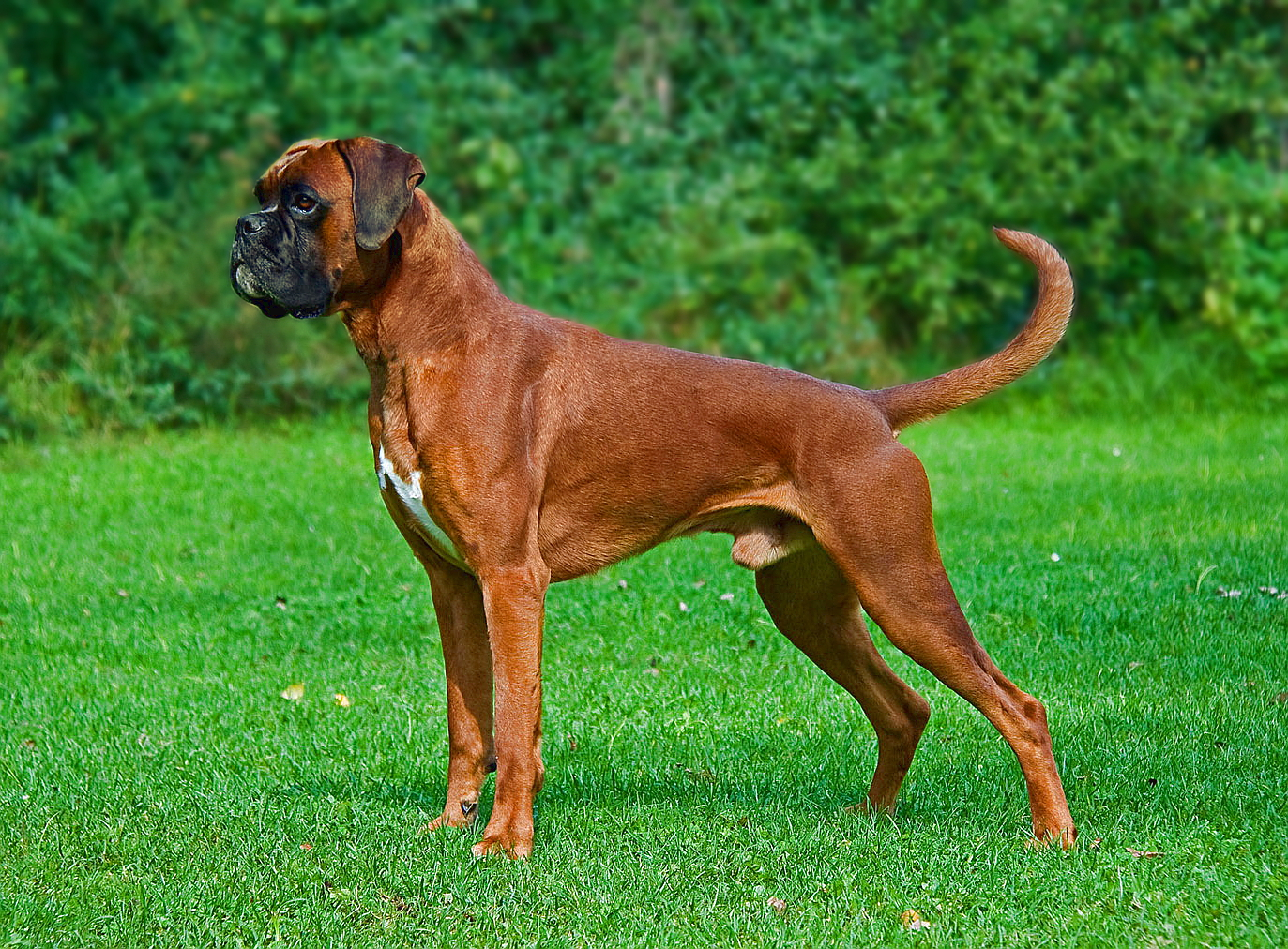
- Fawn boxer, uncropped and undocked
- Other names: German Boxer; Deutscher Boxer
- Origin: Germany
Traits
Height	Males	56–64 cm (22–25 in)
	Females	53–61 cm (21–24 in)
Weight	Males	30–32 kg (66–70 lb)
	Females	25–27 kg (55–60 lb)
- Coat: short, shiny, smooth, close-lying
- Colour: fawn or brindle, and white
- Litter size: average 6–8
Kennel club standards
- VDH: standard
- Fédération Cynologique Internationale: standard

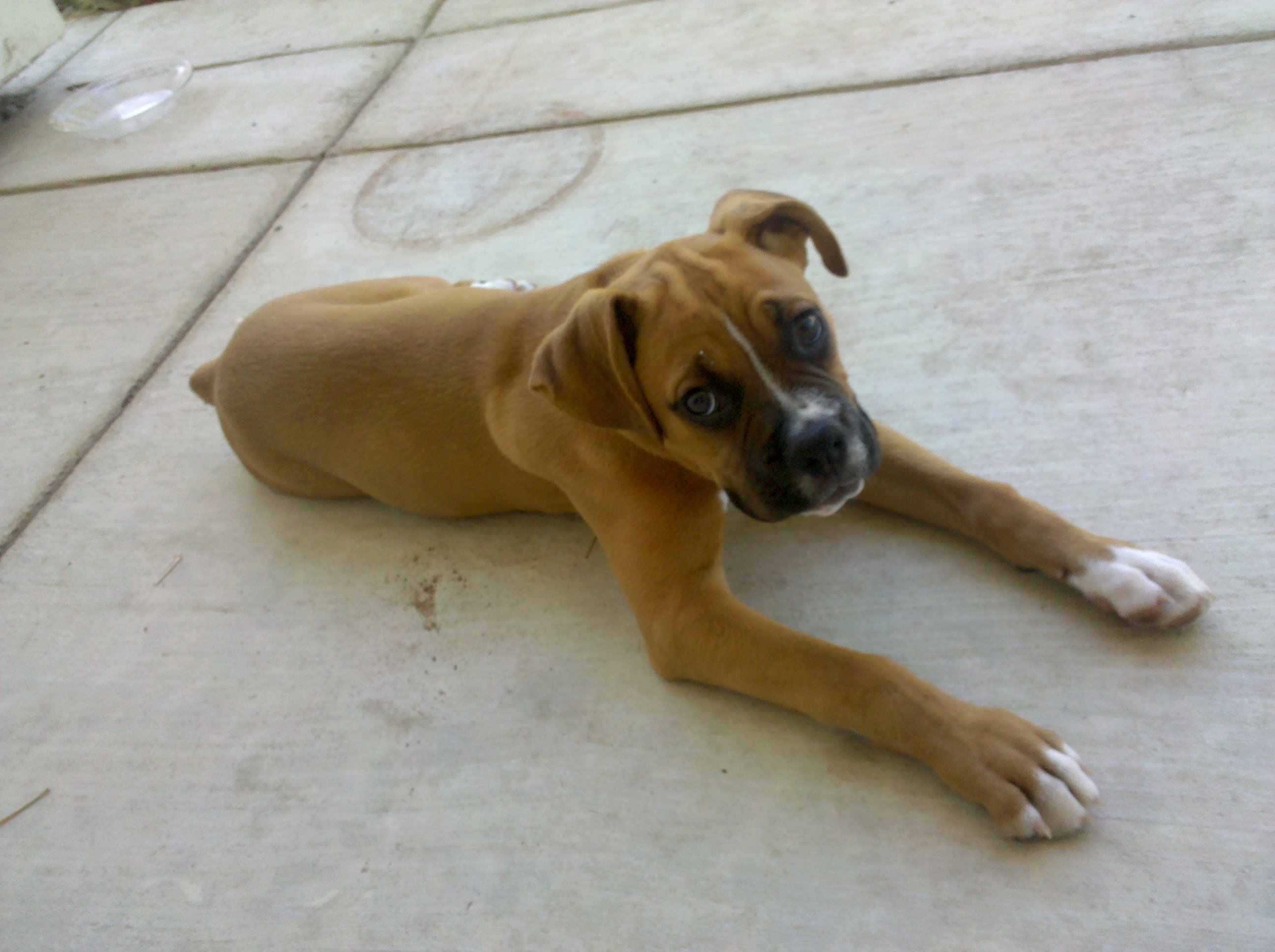
Fawn boxer puppy

The Boxer is a medium to large, short-haired dog breed of mastiff-type, developed in Germany. The coat is smooth and tight-fitting; colors are fawn or brindled, with or without white markings. Boxers are brachycephalic (they have broad, short skulls), have a square muzzle, mandibular prognathism (an underbite), very strong jaws, and a powerful bite ideal for hanging on to large prey. The Boxer was bred from the Old English Bulldog and the now extinct Bullenbeisser, which became extinct by crossbreeding rather than by a decadence of the breed. The Boxer is a member of both The Kennel Club and American Kennel Club (AKC) Working Group.

The first Boxer club was founded in 1895, with Boxers being first exhibited in a dog show for St. Bernards in Munich the next year. Based on 2013 AKC statistics, Boxers held steady as the seventh-most popular breed of dog in the United States for the fourth consecutive year. According to the AKC's website, though, the boxer is now the 11th-most popular dog breed in the United States.

== Appearance ==
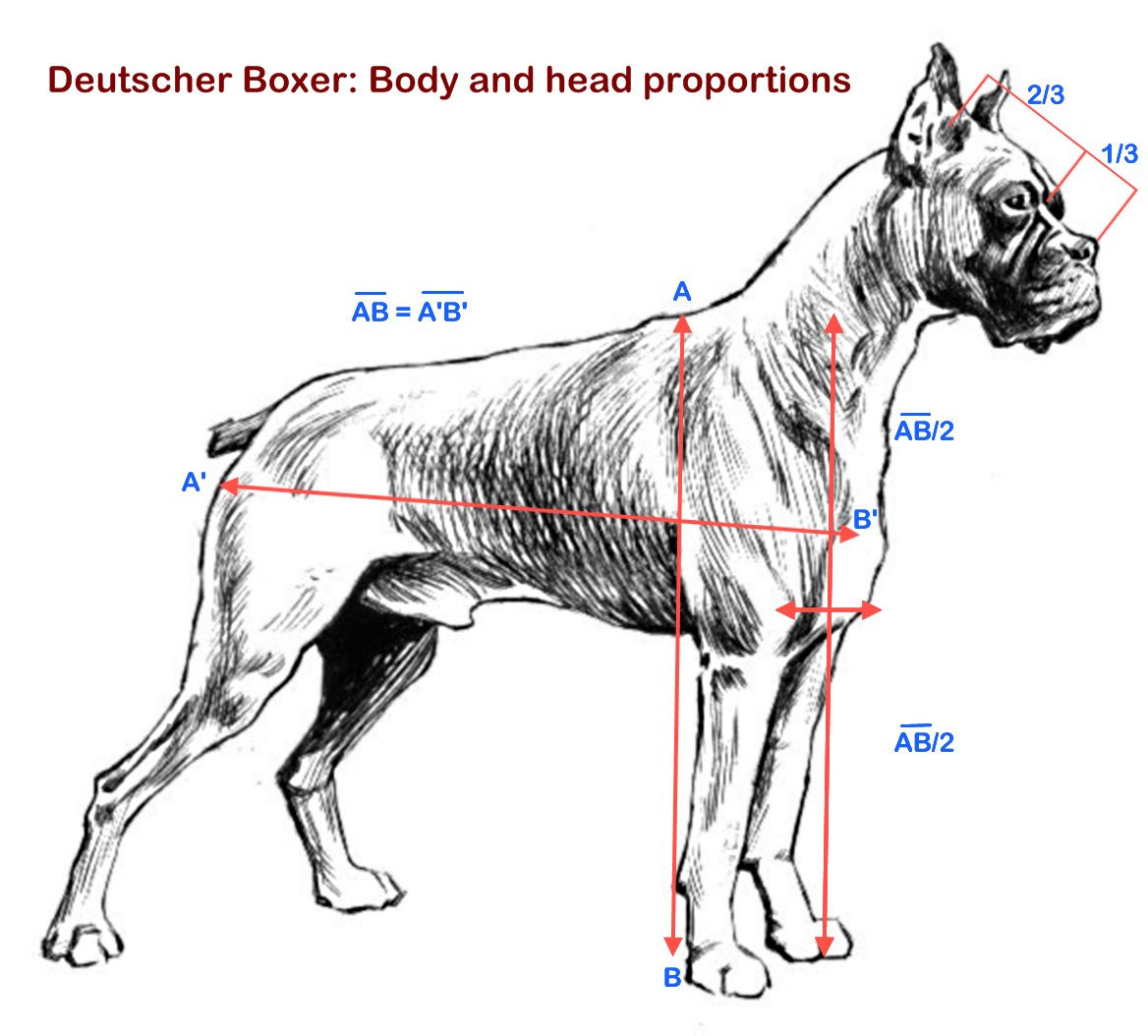
Head and body proportions

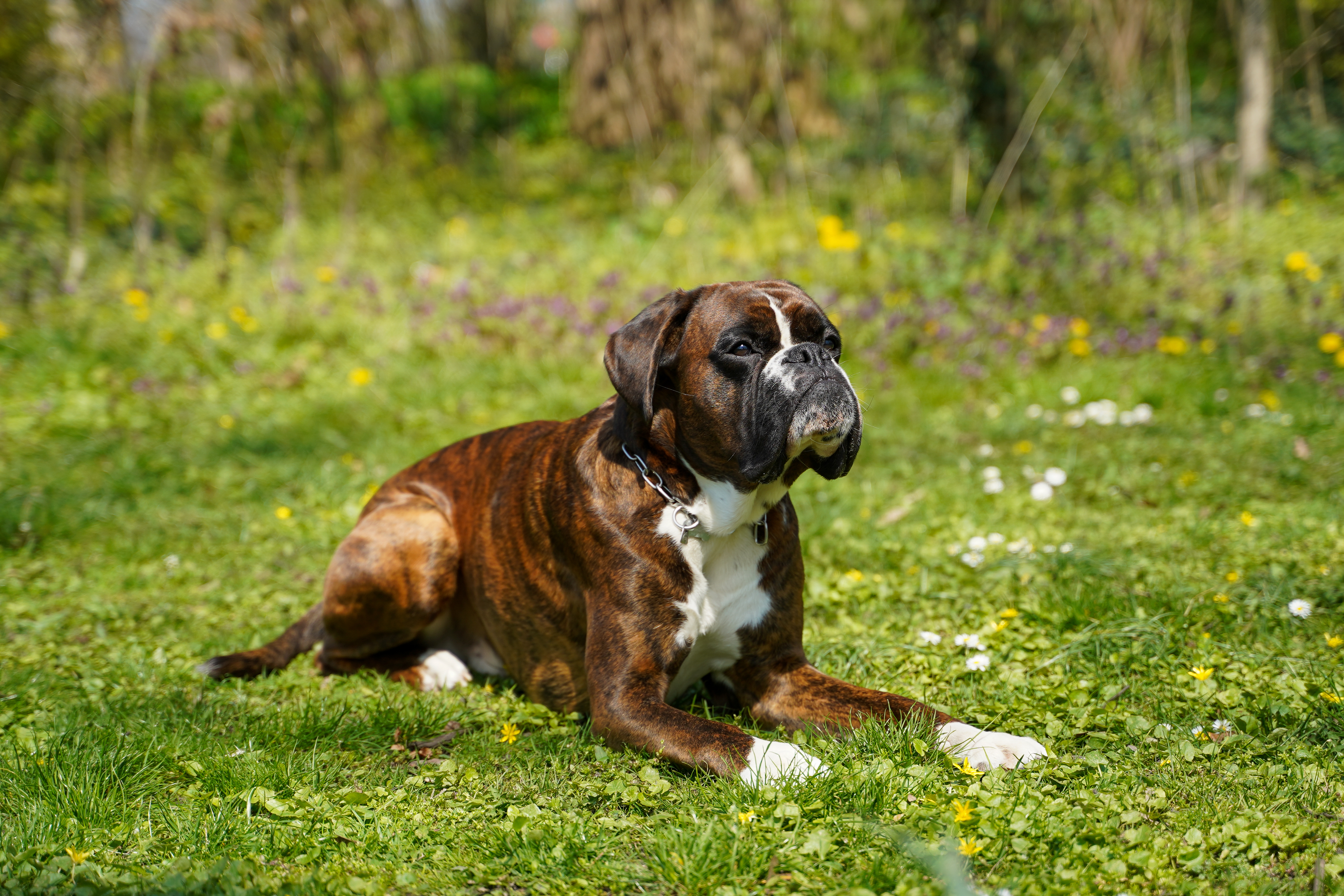
A brindle boxer

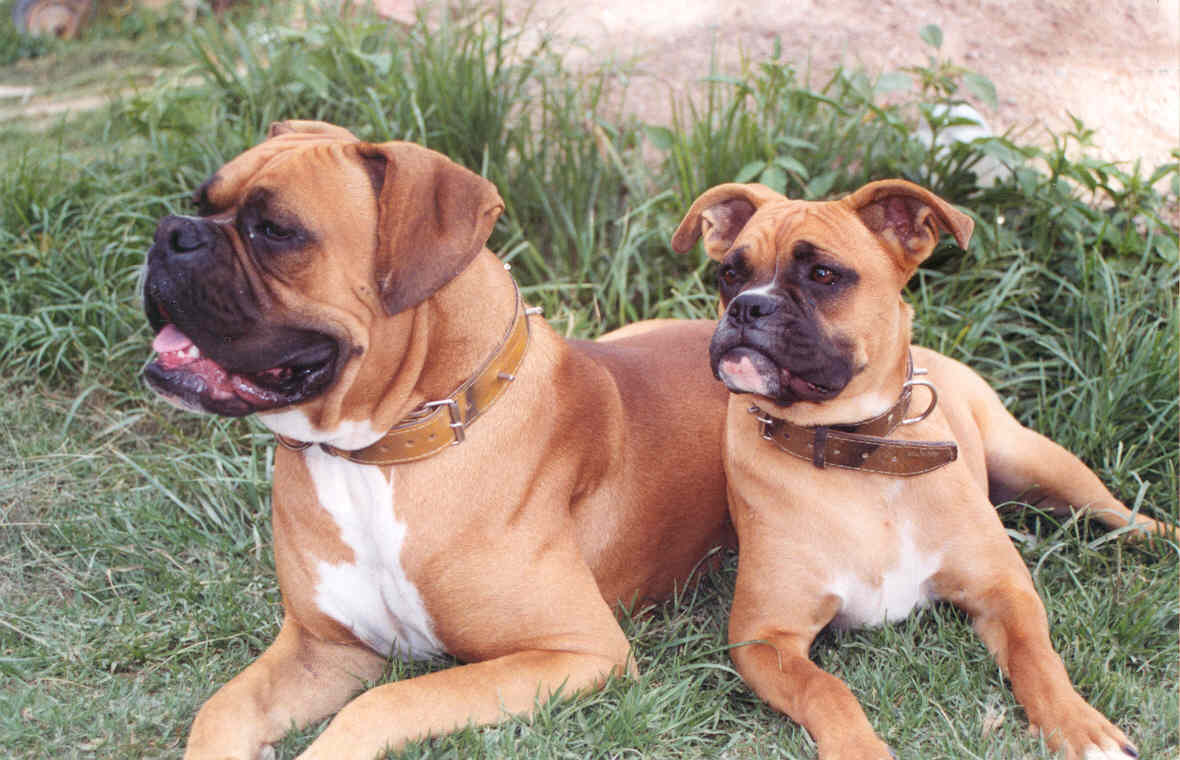
Two fawn Boxers

The head is the most distinctive feature of the Boxer. The breed standard dictates that it must be in perfect proportion to the body and it must never be too light. The greatest value is placed on the muzzle in correct form and in absolute proportion to the skull. The length of the muzzle to the whole of the head should be a ratio of 1:3. Folds are always present from the root of the nose running downwards on both sides of the muzzle, and the tip of the nose should lie somewhat higher than the root of the muzzle. In addition, a Boxer should be slightly prognathous, i.e., the lower jaw should protrude beyond the upper jaw and bend slightly upwards in what is commonly called an underbite or "undershot bite".

Boxers were originally a docked and cropped breed, and this is still done in some countries. Due to pressure from veterinary associations, animal rights groups, and the general public, both cropping of the ears and docking of the tail have been prohibited in some countries around the world and is not recognized by the breed standard determined by the Kennel Club of the UK. The AKC still permits cropped ears. A line of naturally short-tailed (bobtail) Boxers was developed through crossbreeding with the Pembroke Welsh Corgi in the United Kingdom in anticipation of a tail-docking ban there; after several generations of controlled breeding, these dogs were accepted in the Kennel Club (UK) registry in 1998, and today representatives of the bobtail line can be found in many countries. In 2008, the Fédération Cynologique Internationale (FCI) added a "naturally stumpy tail" as a disqualifying fault in their breed standard, meaning those Boxers born with a bobtail can no longer be shown in FCI member countries.

As of 2012, cropped ears are still more common in show dogs in Canada and the United States, though the practice of cosmetic cropping is currently opposed by the American Veterinary Medical Association. In March 2005, the AKC breed standard was changed to include a description of the uncropped ear, but to severely penalize an undocked tail. The tail of a boxer is typically docked before the cartilage is fully formed, from 3–5 days old. The procedure does not require any sutures when performed at this young age, and anesthesia is not used. The docking of the tail is not permitted under the breed standard of The Kennel Club UK.

=== Coat and colors ===
The Boxer is a short-haired breed, with a smooth coat that lies tight to the body. The recognized colors are fawn and brindle, frequently with a white underbelly and white on the feet. These white markings, called "flash," often extend onto the neck or face, and dogs that have these markings are known as "flashy." "Fawn" denotes a range of colors, the tones of which may be described variously as light tan or yellow, reddish tan, mahogany, or stag/deer red, and dark honey-blonde. In the UK and Europe, fawn Boxers are typically rich in color and are often called "red." "Brindle" refers to a dog with black stripes on a fawn background. Some brindle Boxers are so heavily striped that they give the appearance of "reverse brindling," fawn stripes on a black body; these dogs are conventionally called "reverse brindles," but that is actually a misnomer—they are still fawn dogs with black stripes. In addition, the breed standards state that the fawn background must clearly contrast with or show through the brindling.

The Boxer does not carry the gene for a solid black coat color, so purebred black Boxers do not exist. Boxers that appear black are actually heavily brindled, where the fawn color is completely sealed out by the black striping. These are often referred to as "sealed" Boxers, and are not an AKC recognized coloring.

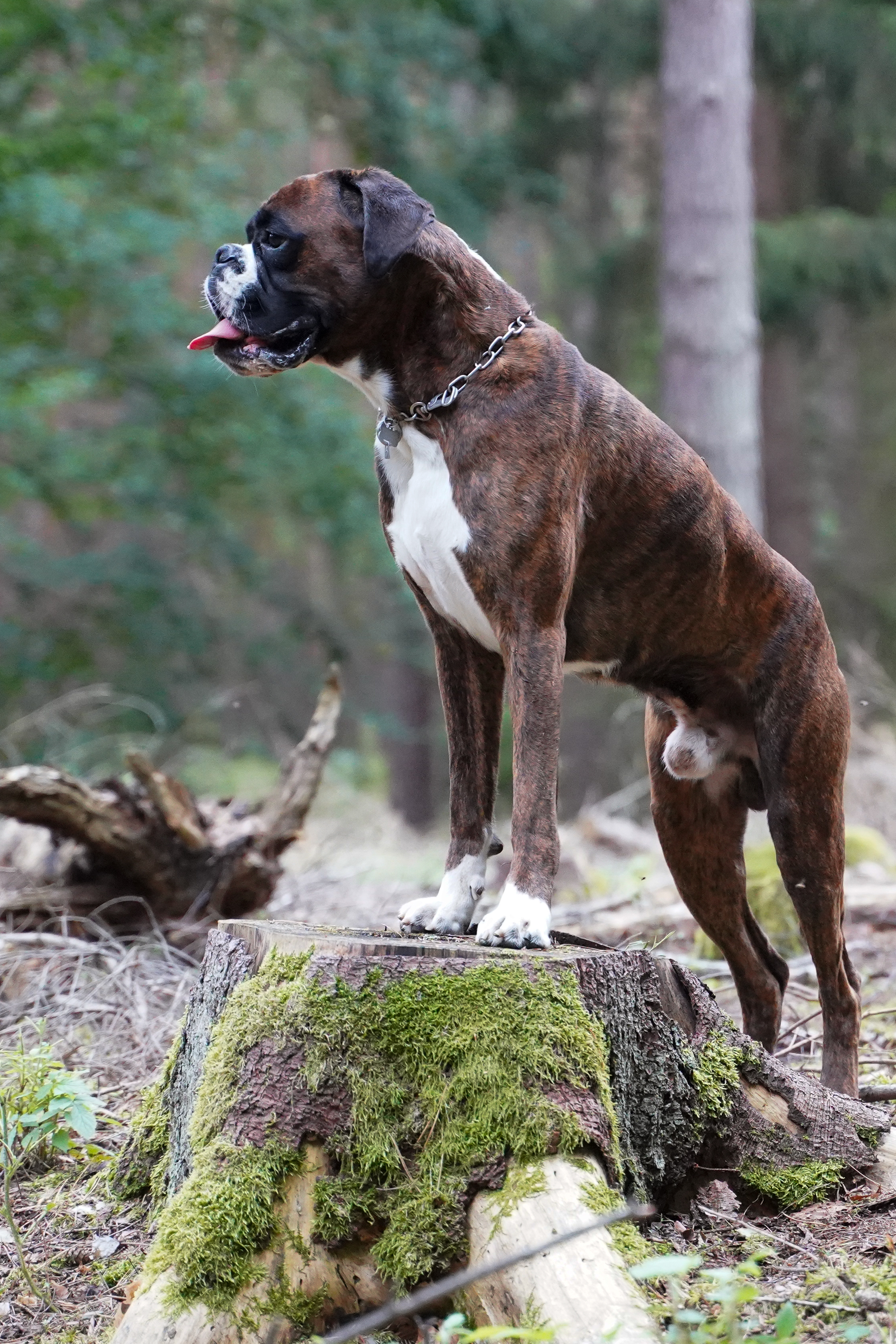
The color brindle can be with or without white markings.

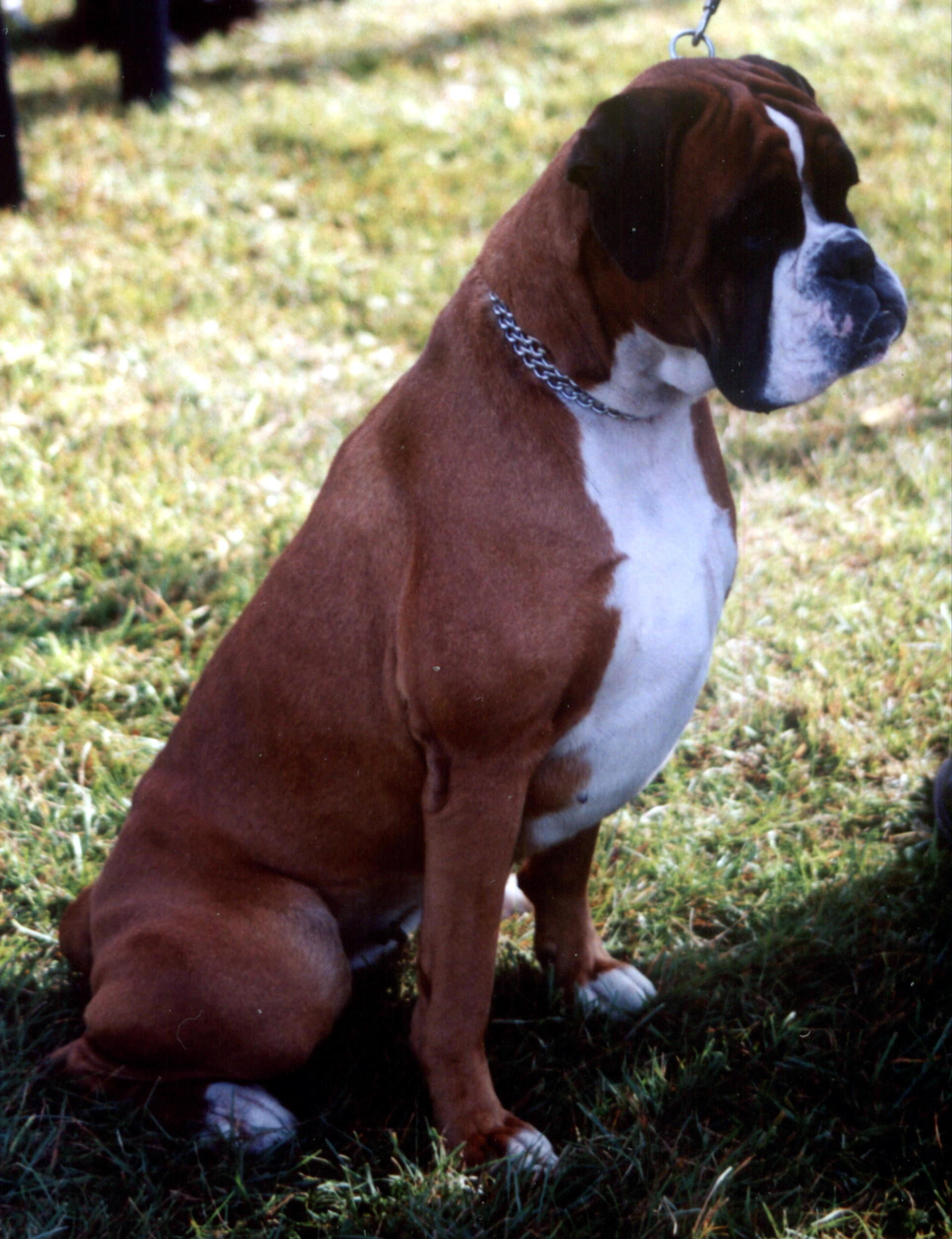
A red fawn Boxer

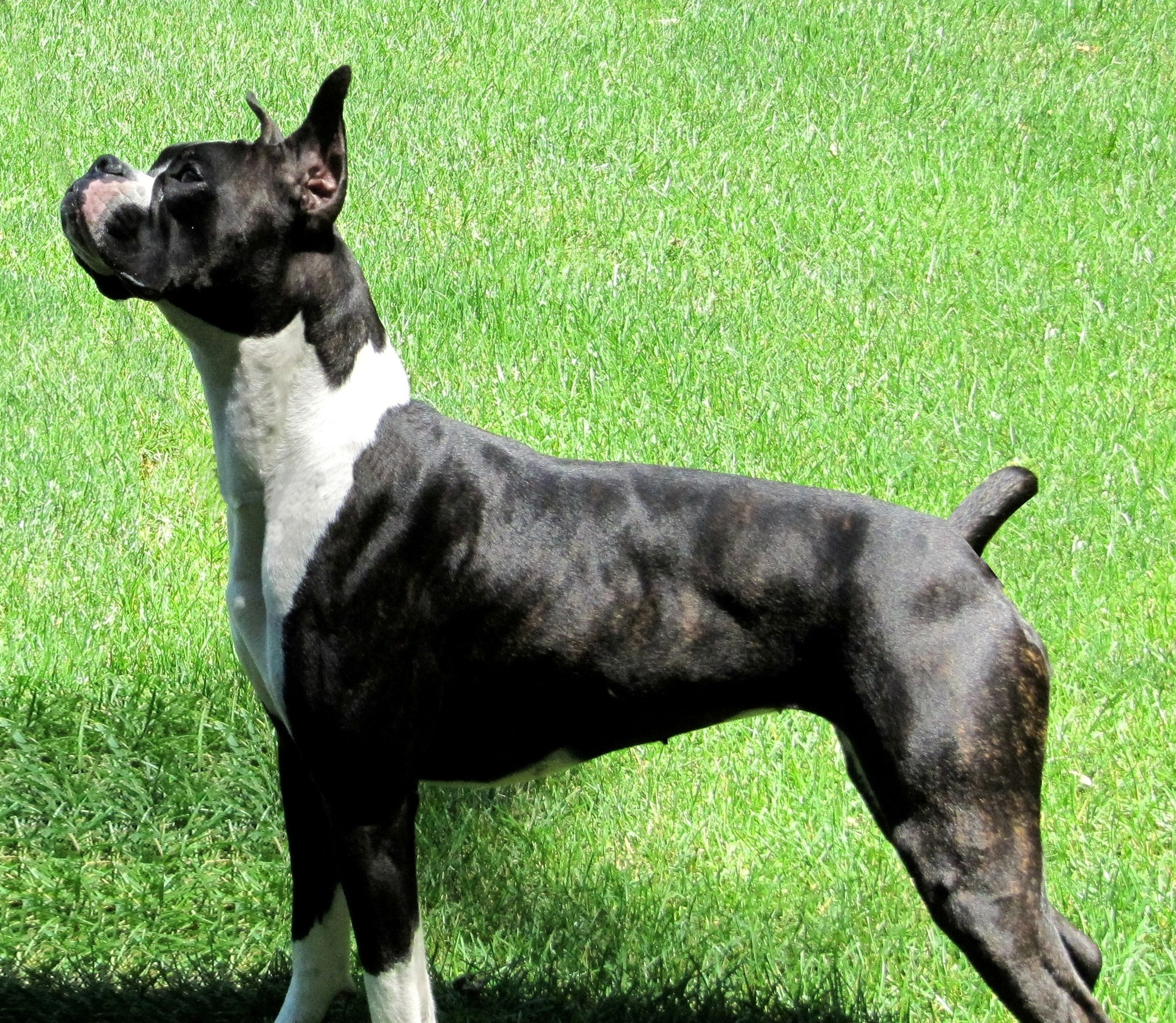
Reverse ("sealed") brindle Boxer, cropped and docked

=== White Boxers ===
Boxers with white markings covering more than one-third of their coat – conventionally called "white" Boxers – are neither albino nor rare; about 20–25% of all Boxers born are white. Genetically, these dogs are either fawn or brindle, with excessive white markings overlying the base coat color. Like fair-skinned humans, white Boxers have a higher risk of sunburn and associated skin cancers than darker Boxers. The extreme piebald gene, which is responsible for white markings in Boxers, is linked to congenital sensorineural deafness in dogs. An estimated 18% of white Boxers are deaf in one or both ears, though Boxer rescue organizations see about double that number.

In the past, breeders often euthanized white puppies at birth. A 1998 study of Boxers in the Netherlands showed that 17% of Boxer pups were euthanized because they were white. Previously, the American Boxer Club "unofficially recommended euthanasia for these animals." Reasons for euthanizing white pups include the view that selling a dog with "faults" is unethical, which is in stark contrast to the AKC preference for docked tails. Additionally there is the perception that white Boxers are at higher risk of ending up abandoned in rescues. Today, breeders are increasingly reluctant to euthanize healthy pups and may choose to neuter and place them in pet homes, instead.

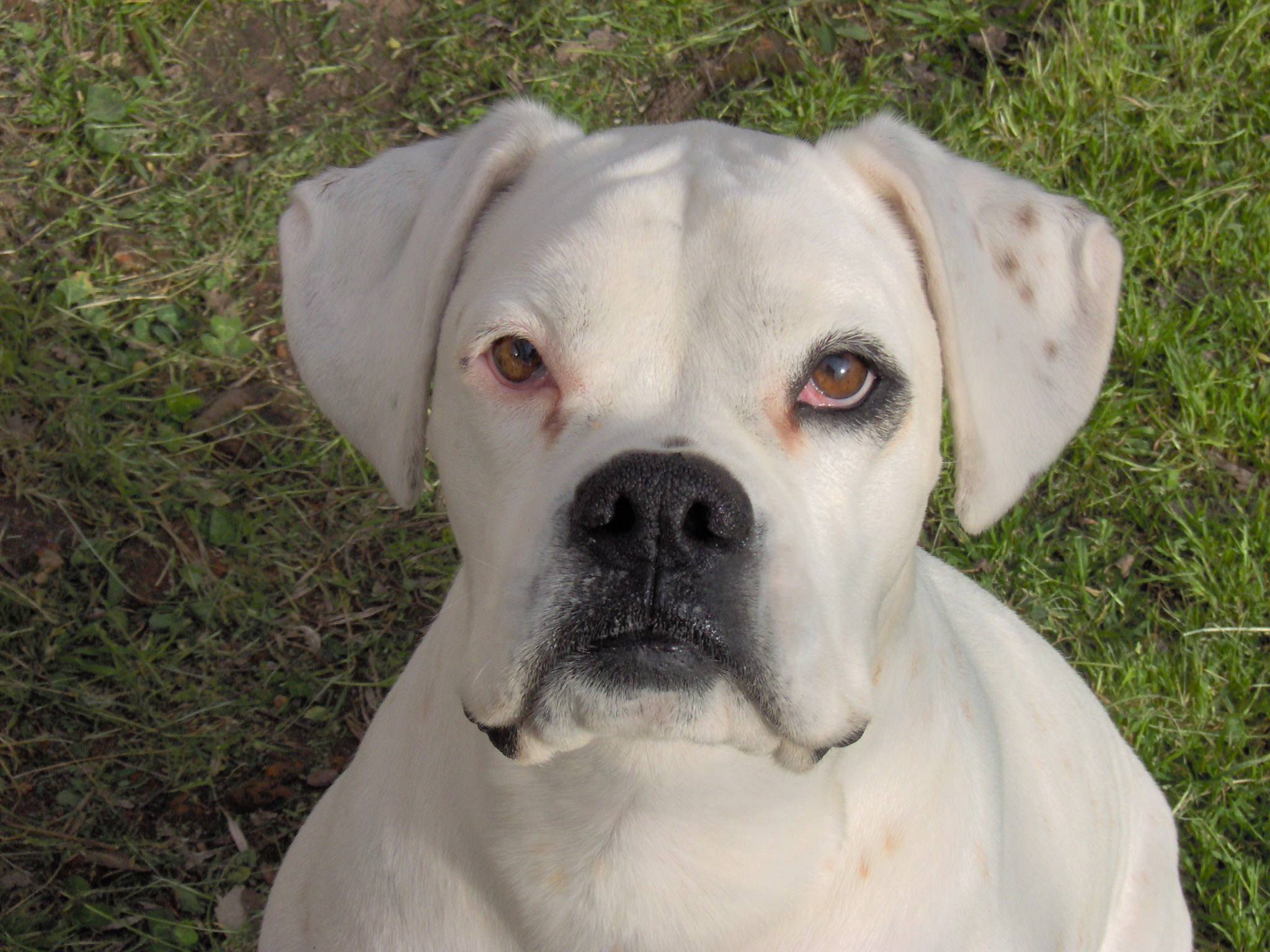
All-white Boxer

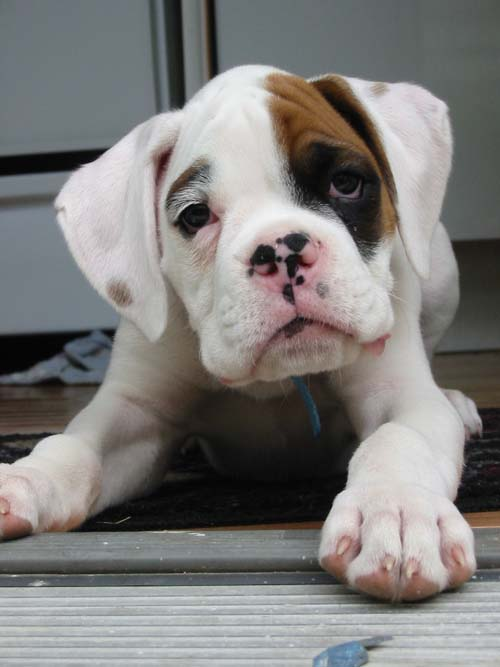
A white Boxer pup with a fawn patch on the face.

== Temperament ==
The character of the Boxer is of the greatest importance and demands the most solicitous attention. He is renowned from olden times for his great love and faithfulness to his master and household. He is harmless in the family, but can be distrustful of strangers, bright and friendly of temperament at play, but brave and determined when aroused. His intelligence and willing tractability, his modesty and cleanliness make him a highly desirable family dog and cheerful companion. He is the soul of honesty and loyalty, and is never false or treacherous even in his old age.

— 1938 AKC Boxer breed standard

General appearance

Great nobility, smooth-coated, medium-sized, square build, strong bone and evident, well developed muscles.

Characteristics

Lively, strong, loyal to owner and family, but distrustful of strangers. Obedient, friendly at play, but with guarding instinct.

Temperament

Equable, biddable, fearless, self-assured.

— 2021 The Kennel Club breed standard

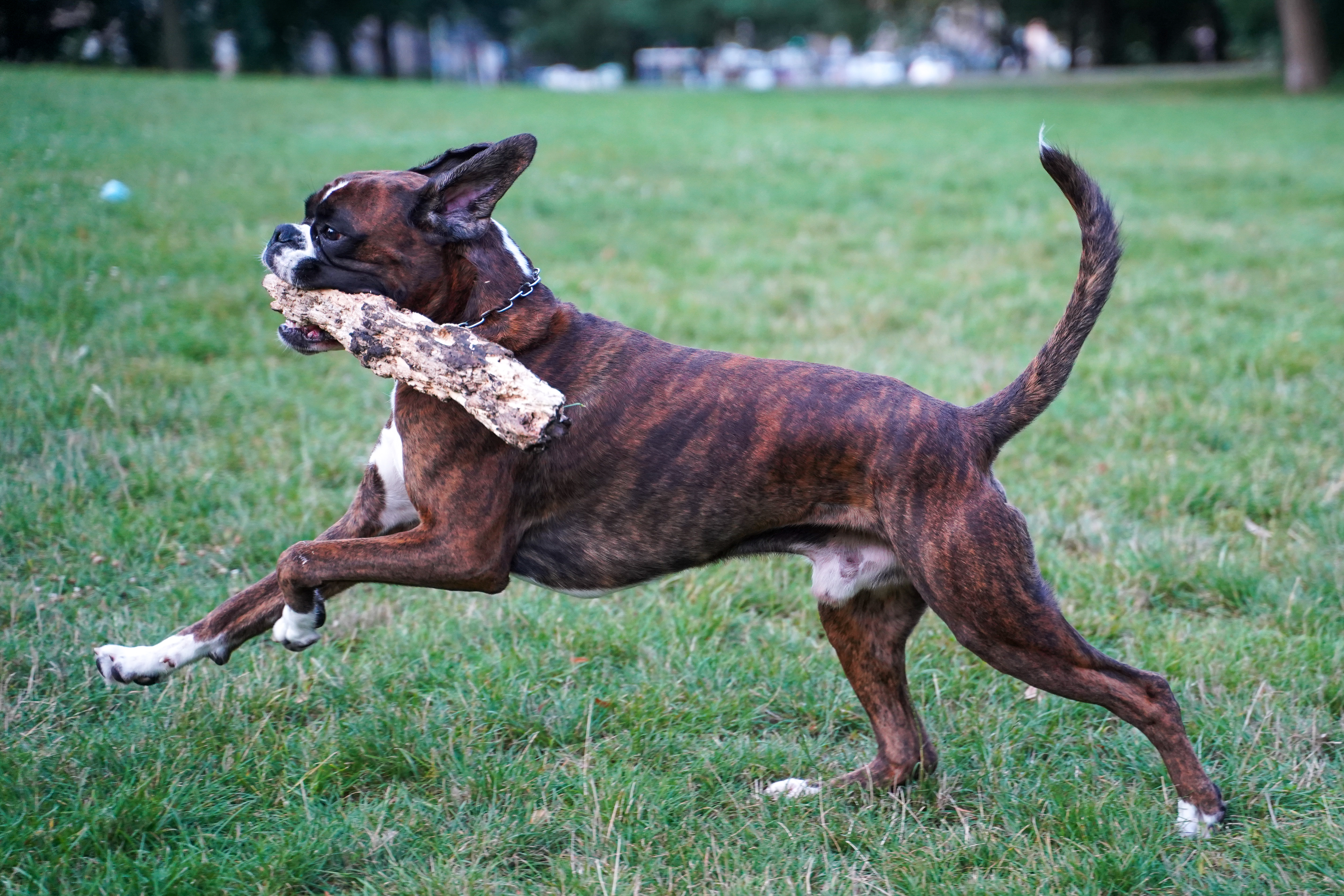
A playful Boxer

Boxers are a bright, energetic, and playful breed and tend to be very good with children. They are patient and spirited with children, but also protective, making them a popular choice for families. They are active, strong dogs that require adequate exercise to prevent boredom-associated behaviors such as chewing, digging, or licking. Boxers have earned a slight reputation of being "headstrong," which can be related to inappropriate obedience training. Owing to their intelligence and working-breed characteristics, training based on corrections often has limited usefulness. Boxers, like other animals, typically respond better to positive reinforcement techniques such as clicker training, an approach based on operant conditioning and behaviorism, which offers the dog an opportunity to think independently and problem-solve. In a survey of obedience trainers by Stanley Coren, summarized in his book The Intelligence of Dogs, Boxers were ranked at number 48—average working/obedience intelligence. Many who have worked with Boxers disagree quite strongly with Coren's survey results and maintain that a skilled trainer who uses reward-based methods will find Boxers have far above-average intelligence and working ability.

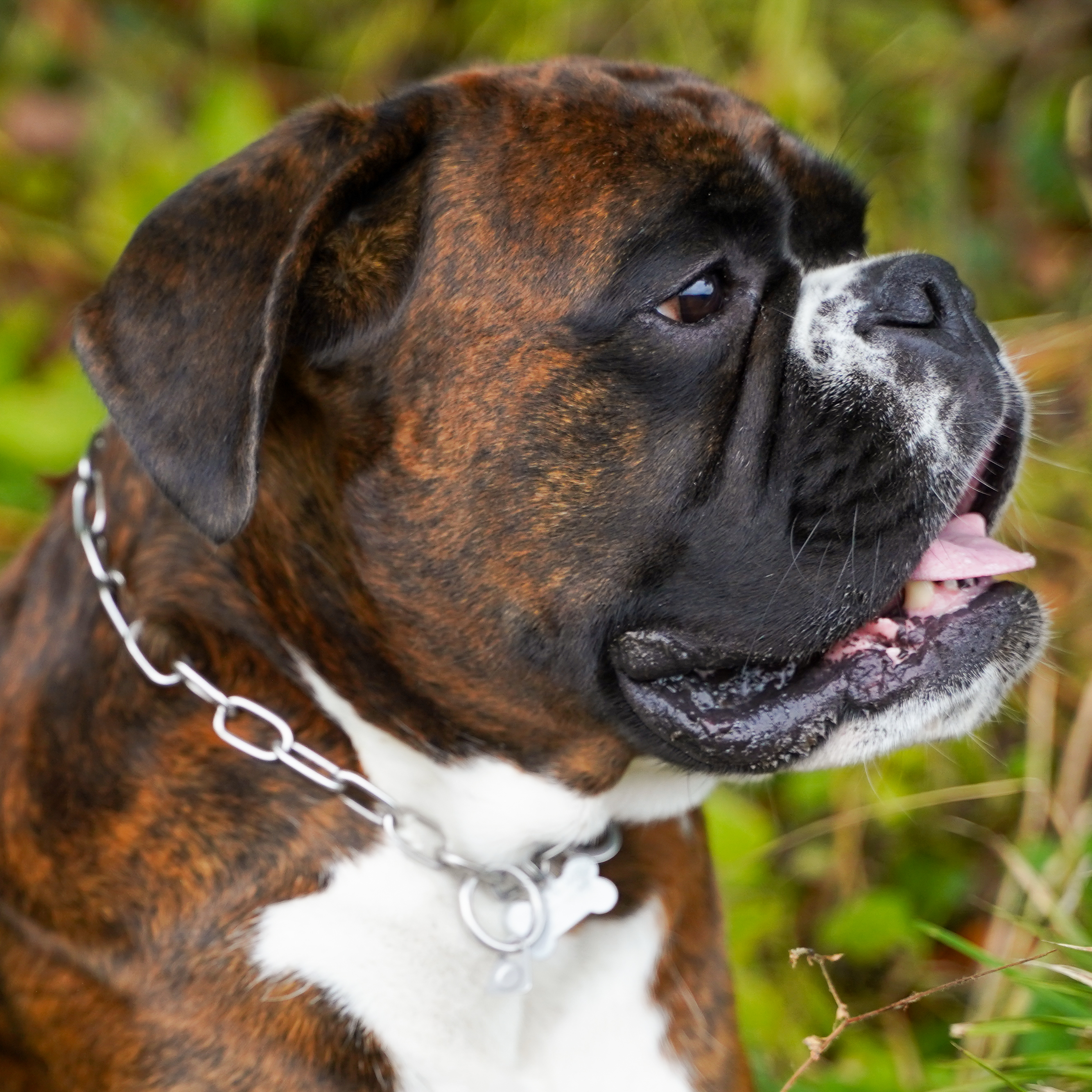
Brindle Boxer head

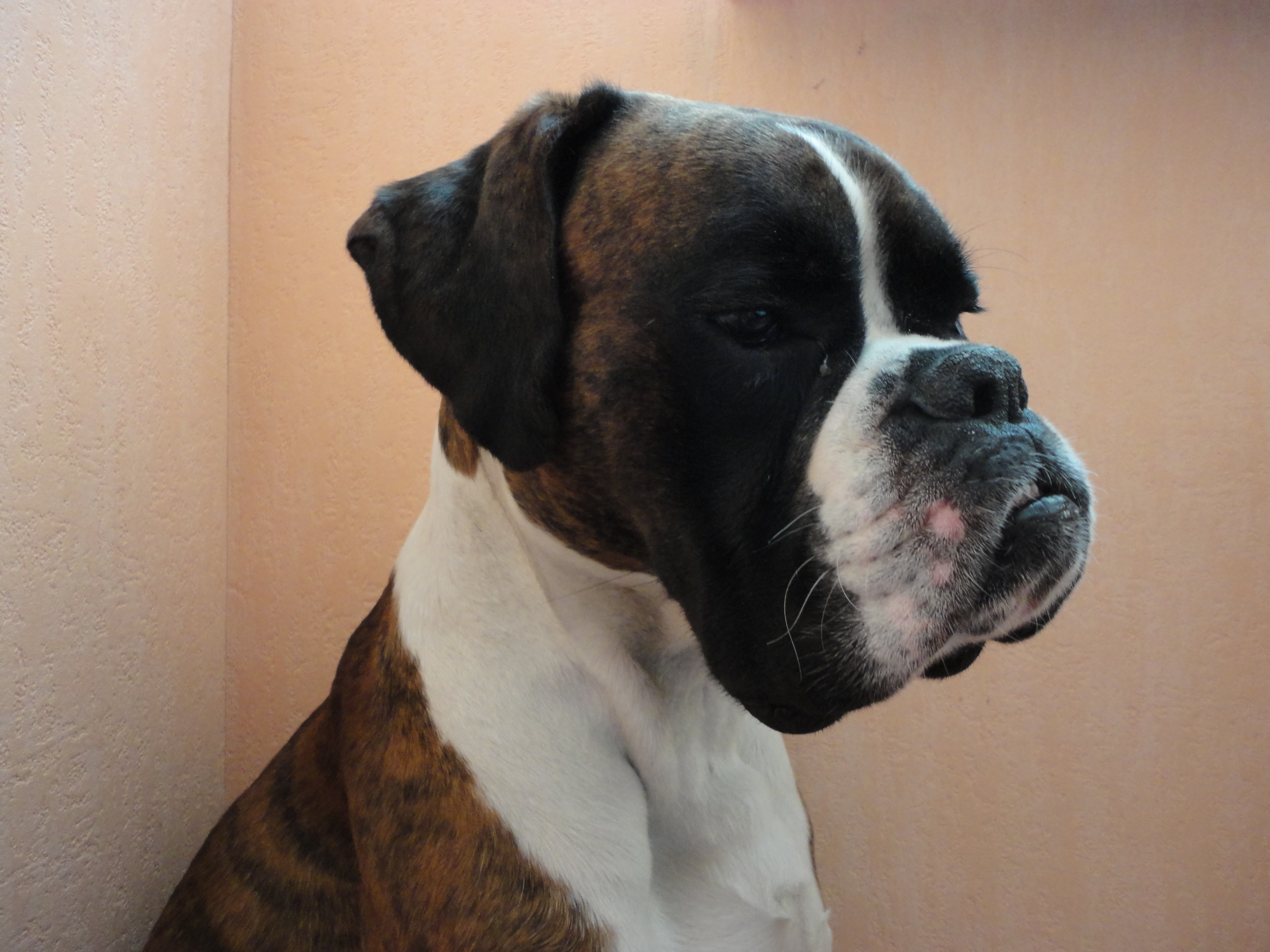
Brindle boxer head with white neck

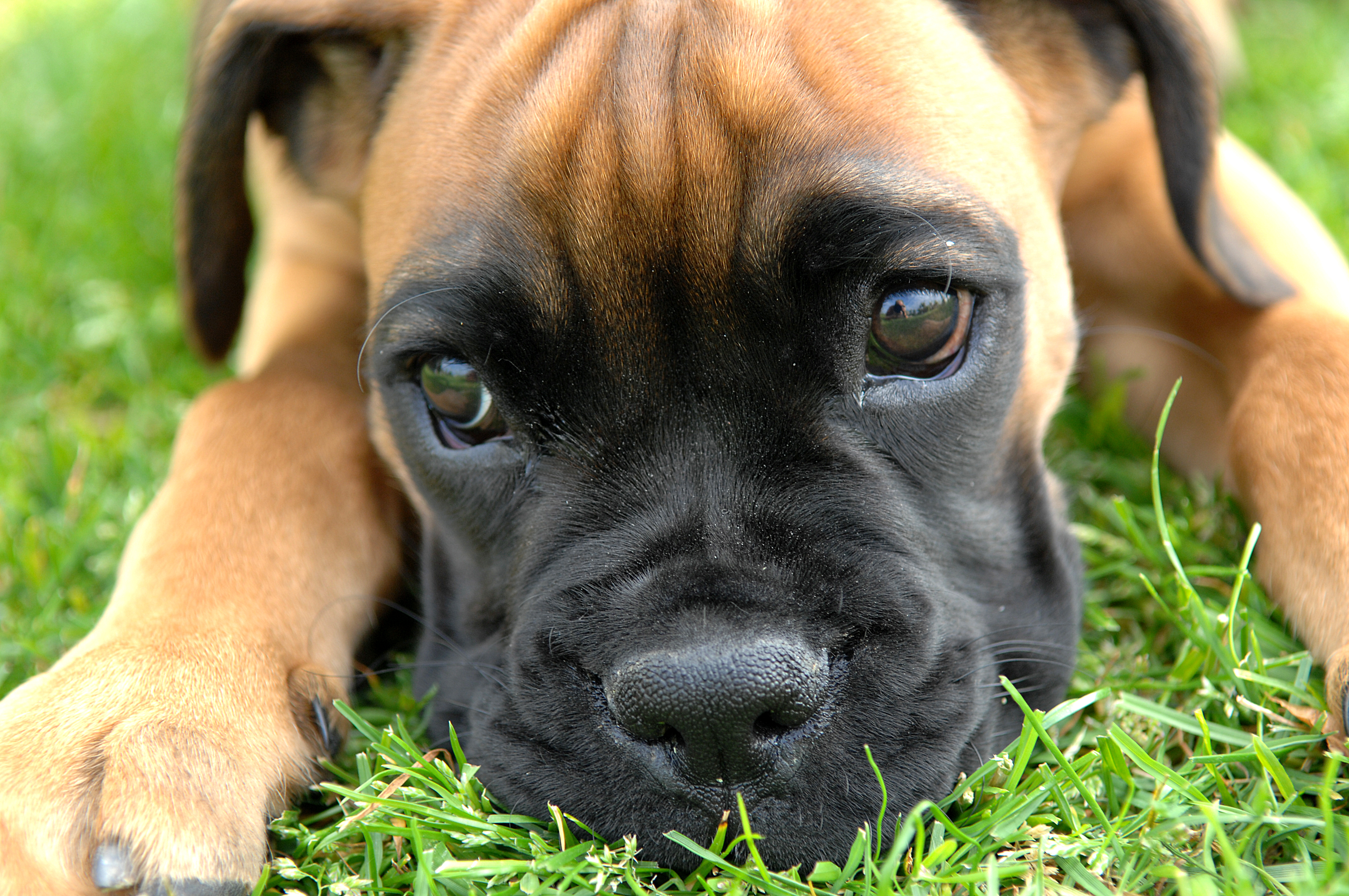
A fawn Boxer puppy

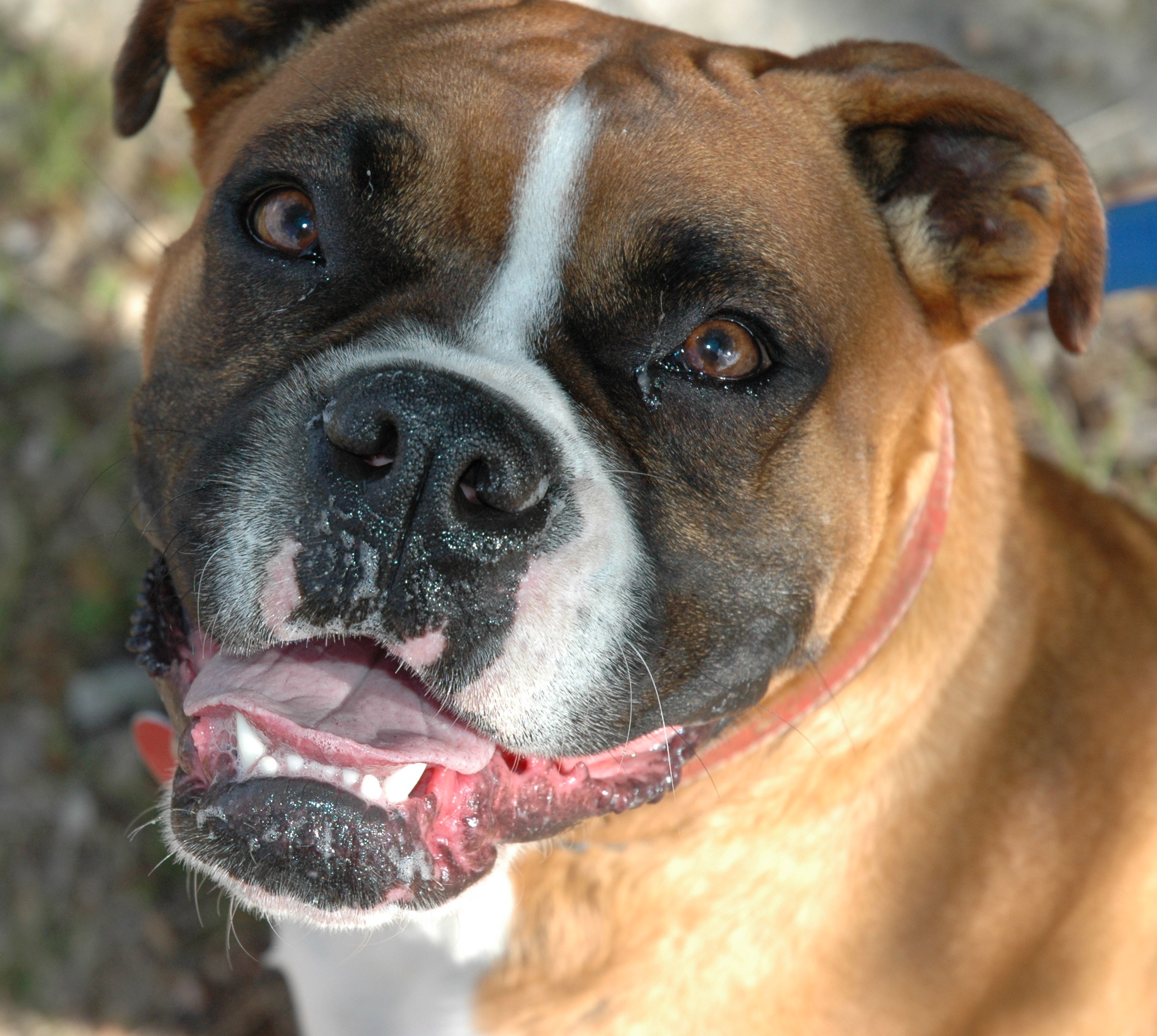
A fawn Boxer head

== History ==
Friedrich Robert and his boxer, 1894

The Boxer is a hunting mastiff developed in Germany in the late 19th century from the now extinct Bullenbeisser, a dog of English Mastiff descent, and Bulldogs brought in from Great Britain. The Bullenbeisser had been working as a hunting dog for centuries, employed in the pursuit of bear, wild boar, and deer. Its task was to seize the prey and hold it until the hunters arrived. In later years, faster dogs were favored and a smaller Bullenbeisser was bred in Brabant, in northern Belgium. The Brabanter Bullenbeisser is generally accepted as being a direct ancestor of today's Boxer.

In 1894, three Germans, Friedrich Robert, Elard König, and R. Höpner, decided to stabilize the breed and put it on exhibition at a dog show. This was done in Munich in 1896, the year before they founded the first Boxer Club, the Deutscher Boxer Club. The club went on to publish the first Boxer breed standard in 1904, a detailed document that has not been changed much since.

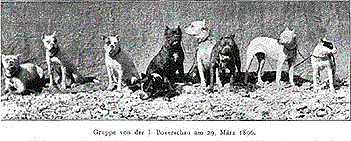
Boxers on the first boxer exhibition, Munich, 1896

The breed was introduced to other parts of Europe in the late 19th century and to the United States around the turn of the 20th century. The AKC registered the first Boxer in 1904, and recognized the first Boxer champion, Dampf vom Dom, in 1915. During World War I, the Boxer was co-opted for military work, acting as a valuable messenger dog, pack carrier, attack dog, and guard dog. The Boxer did not become popular around the world until after World War II. Taken home by returning soldiers, the breed was introduced to a wider audience and soon became a favorite as a companion, show dog, and guard dog.

=== Early genealogy ===
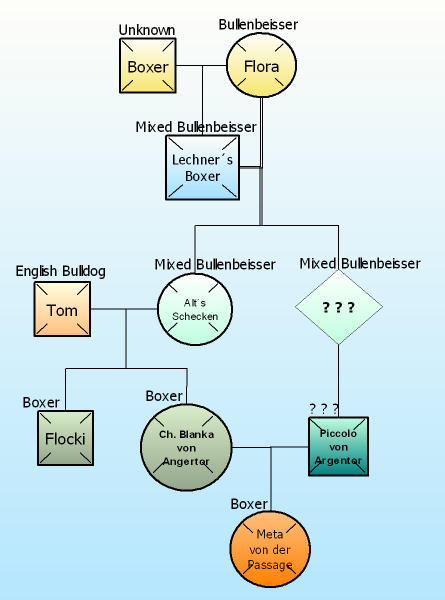
Boxer early genealogy chart

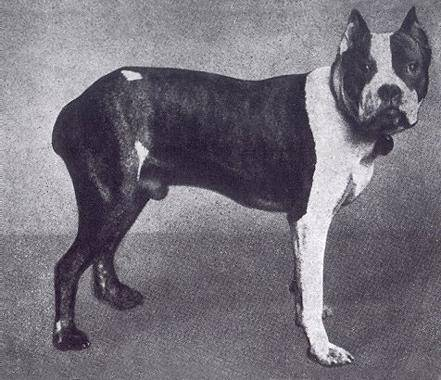
Flocki, the first Boxer

German citizen George Alt, a Munich resident, mated a brindle-colored female dog imported from France named Flora with a local dog of unknown ancestry, known simply as "Boxer," resulting in a fawn-and-white male, named Lechner's Box after its owner.

This dog was mated with his own dam, Flora, and one of his offspring was a female called Alt's Schecken. George Alt mated Schecken with a Bulldog named Dr. Toneissen's Tom to produce the historically significant dog Mühlbauer's Flocki. Flocki was the first Boxer to enter the German Stud Book after winning the aforementioned show for St. Bernards in Munich in 1896, which was the first event to have a class specific to Boxers.

The white female dog, Ch. Blanka von Angertor, Flocki's sister, was even more influential when mated with Piccolo von Angertor (Lechner's Box grandson) to produce the predominantly white (particolored) female dog Meta von der Passage, which, even bearing little resemblance with the modern Boxer standard (early photographs depict her as too long, weak-backed, and down-faced), is considered the mother of the breed. John Wagner, in The Boxer (first published in 1939) said the following regarding this female dog:

Meta von der Passage played the most important role of the five original ancestors. Our great line of sires all trace directly back to this female. She was a substantially built, low to the ground, brindle and white particolor, lacking in underjaw and exceedingly lippy. As a producing female, few in any breed can match her record. She consistently whelped puppies of marvelous type and rare quality. Those of her offspring sired by Flock St. Salvator and Wotan dominate all present-day pedigrees. Combined with Wotan and Mirzl children, they made the Boxer.

=== Breed name ===
The name "Boxer" is supposedly derived from the breed's tendency to play by standing on its hind legs and "boxing" with its front paws. According to Andrew H. Brace's Pet Owner's Guide to the Boxer, this theory is the least plausible explanation. He claims, "it's unlikely that a nation so permeated with nationalism would give to one of its most famous breeds a name so obviously anglicised."

German linguistic and historical evidence finds the earliest written source for the word Boxer in the 18th century, where it is found in a text in the Deutsches Fremdwörterbuch (The German Dictionary of Foreign Words), which cites an author named Musäus of 1782 writing "daß er aus Furcht vor dem großen Baxer Salmonet ... sich auf einige Tage in ein geräumiges Packfaß ... absentiret hatte". At that time, the spelling "baxer" equaled "boxer." Both the verb (boxen [English "to box, to punch, to jab"]) and the noun (Boxer) were common German words as early as the late 18th century. The term Boxl, also written Buxn or Buchsen in the Bavarian dialect, means "short (leather) trousers" or "underwear." The very similar-sounding term Boxerl, also from the Bavarian dialect, is an endearing term for Boxer. More in line with historical facts, Brace states that many other theories may explain the origin of the breed name, from which he favors the one claiming the smaller Bullenbeisser (Brabanter) dogs were also known as Boxl and that Boxer is just a corruption of that word.

In the same vein runs a theory based on the fact that a group of dogs was known as Bierboxer in Munich by the time of the breed's development. These dogs were the result from mixes of Bullenbeisser and other similar breeds. Bier (beer) probably refers to the Biergarten, the typical Munich beer garden, an open-air restaurant where people used to take their dogs along. The nickname "Deutscher Boxer" was derived from Bierboxer, and Boxer could also be a corruption of the former or a contraction of the latter.

A passage from the book The Complete Boxer by Milo G Denlinger states:

It has been claimed that the name "Boxer" was jokingly applied by an English traveler who noted a tendency of the dog to use its paws in fighting. This seems improbable. Any such action would likely result in a badly bitten if not broken leg. On the other hand, a German breeder of 40 years' experience states positively that the Boxer does not use his feet, except to try to extinguish a small flame such as a burning match. But a Boxer does box with his head. He will hit (not bite) a cat with his muzzle hard enough to knock it out and he will box a ball with his nose. Or perhaps, since the German dictionary translates Boxer as "prize-fighter", the name was bestowed in appreciation of the fighting qualities of the breed rather than its technique.

Boxer is also the name of a dog owned by John Peerybingle, the main character in the best-selling 1845 book The Cricket on the Hearth by Charles Dickens, which is evidence that "Boxer" was commonly used as a dog name by the early 19th century, before the establishment of the breed by the end of that same century.

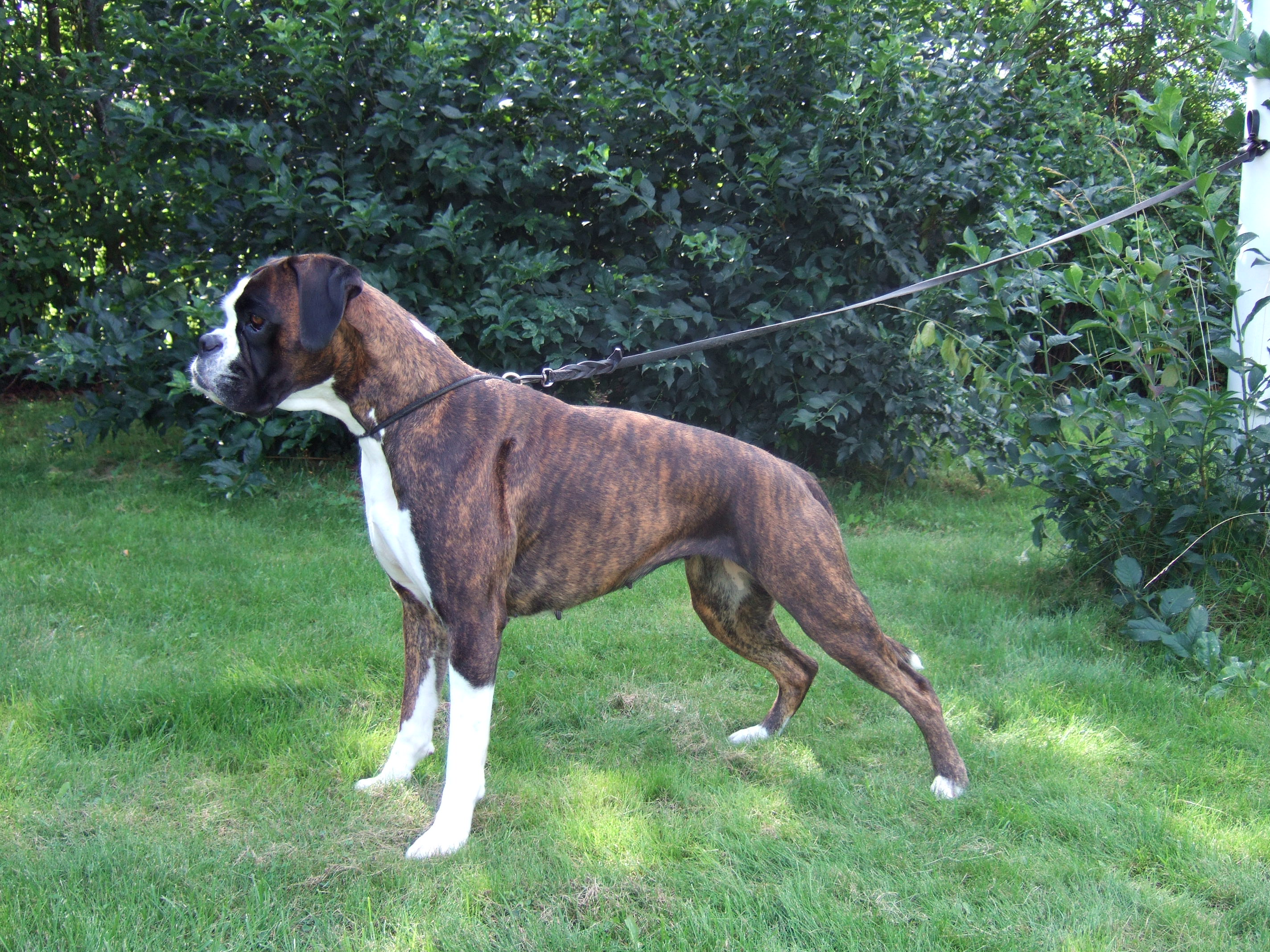
A brindle Boxer with two white socks

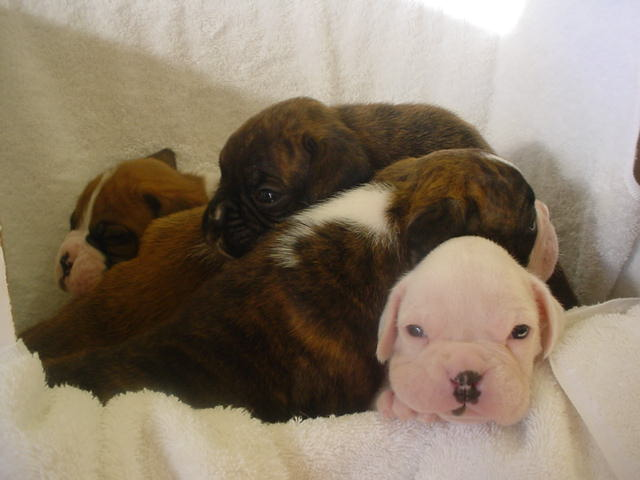
Brindle, fawn, and white Boxer puppies

== Health ==
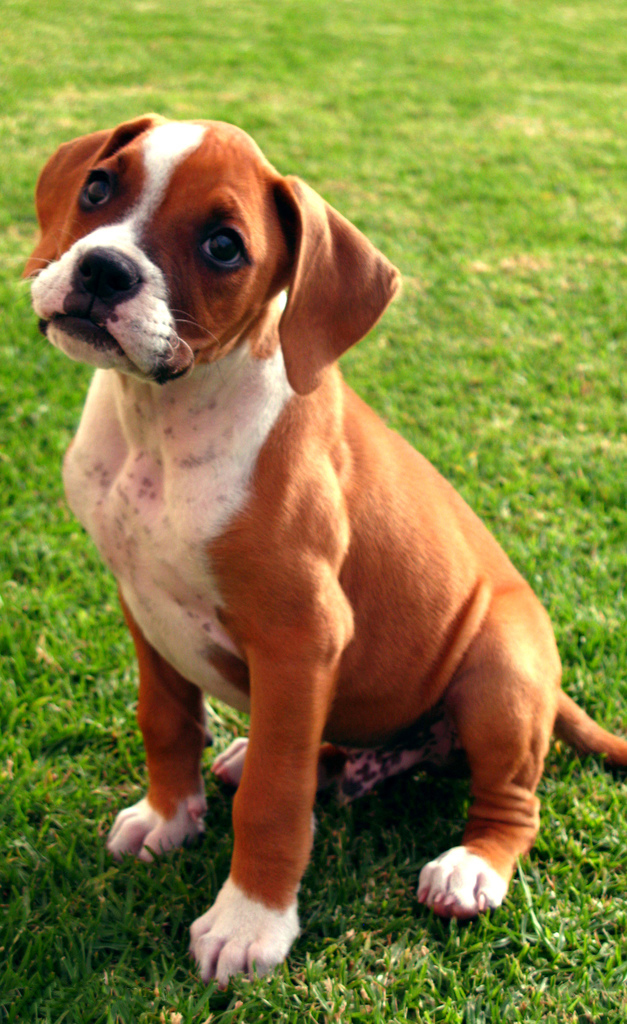
A Boxer puppy

A 2024 UK study found a life expectancy of 11.3 years for the breed compared to an average of 12.7 for purebreeds and 12 for crossbreeds. A 2024 Italian study found a life expectancy of 9 years for the breed compared to 10 years overall. A 2005 Swedish study of insurance data found 50% of Boxers died by the age of 10, higher than the overall rate of 35% of dogs dying by the age of 10.

Leading health issues to which Boxers are prone include cancers, heart conditions such as aortic stenosis and arrhythmogenic right ventricular cardiomyopathy (the so-called "Boxer cardiomyopathy"), hypothyroidism, hip dysplasia, and degenerative myelopathy and epilepsy. Other conditions that may be seen are gastric dilatation volvulus (also known as bloat), intestinal problems, and allergies (although these may be more related to diet than breed). Entropion, a malformation of the eyelid requiring surgical correction, is occasionally seen, and some lines have a tendency toward spondylosis deformans, a fusing of the spine, or dystocia. Other conditions that are less common but occur more often in Boxers than other breeds are histiocytic ulcerative colitis (sometimes called Boxer colitis), an invasive E. coli infection, and indolent corneal ulcers, often called Boxer eye ulcers.

An emerging health concern among boxers is Boxer Juvenile Kidney Disease (JKD), where the kidneys do not develop normally during gestation and leads to chronic renal failure. JKD is most frequently diagnosed in dogs under the age of 3 and often much earlier than this, in puppies before the age of 12 months. There is strong evidence to suggest JKD is an inherited condition in boxers with research being undertaken by the University of Ohio to determine the gene mutation, as well as other work separately by the UK Boxer Breeder Council.

About 22% of puppies die before reaching seven weeks of age. Stillbirth is the most frequent cause of death, followed by infection. Mortality due to infection increases significantly with increases in inbreeding.

According to a UK Kennel Club health survey, cancer accounts for 38.5% of Boxer deaths, followed by old age (21.5%), cardiac (6.9%), and gastrointestinal (6.9%) related issues. The breed is particularly predisposed to mast cell tumours, a cancer of the immune system. Median lifespan was 10.25 years. Responsible breeders use available tests to screen their breeding stock before breeding, and in some cases throughout the life of the dog, in an attempt to minimize the occurrence of these diseases in future generations.

The Boxer is one of the more commonly affected breeds for degenerative myelopathy.

== Nutrition ==
Boxers need plenty of exercise, which means their diet should be high in quality calories. The main source of these calories should be lean animal protein, which includes lean chicken, turkey, lamb, and fish. While on a high calorie diet, owners should be thoughtful of the amount of treats given as this tends to cause obesity. Owners should be mindful of the food to snack ratio being consumed by the Boxer when determining how many treats are acceptable. Some healthy snacks include raw fruits and vegetables.

Boxers are also prone to dental problems, increasing their susceptibility for bad breath; dry dog food that is large and difficult for them to chew increases the likelihood for plaque removal. Plaque can also be removed by crude fiber in kibble, which has a flexible structure that increases chewing time. Dry dog food is often coated with polyphosphates, which further reduces plaque buildup by preventing calcium production in saliva. Odor production from the boxer's mouth is likely to be reduced if its teeth and oral cavity are kept in healthy conditions.

== Uses ==
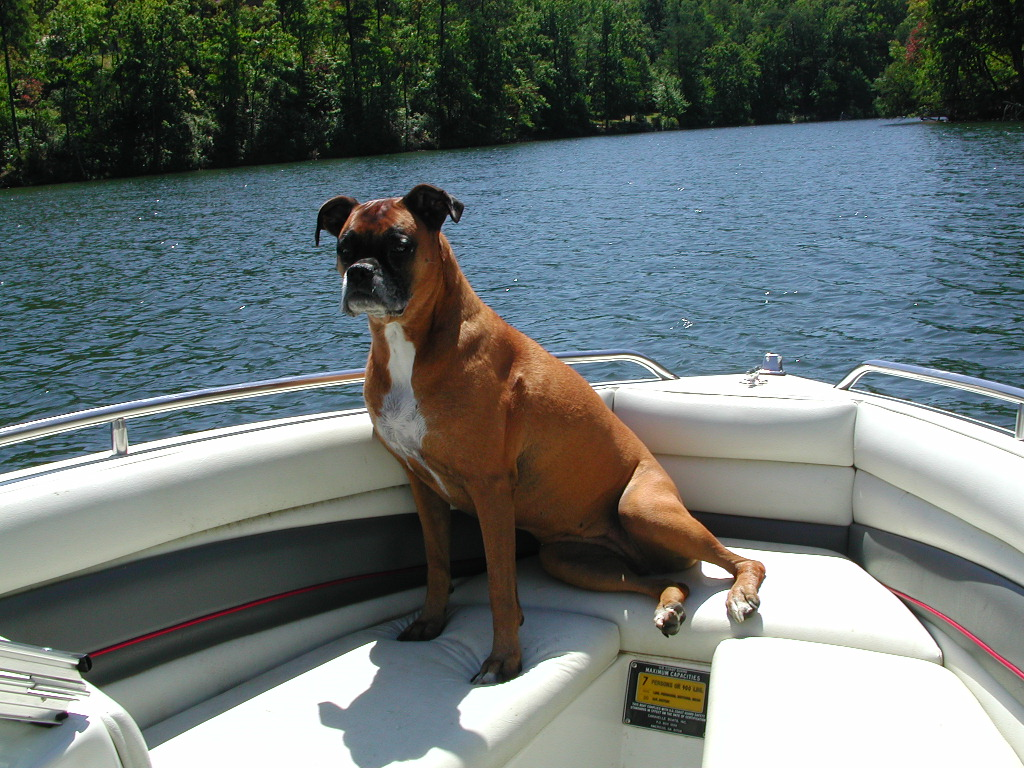
A Boxer on a boat in Lake Lanier, South Carolina

Boxers are generally friendly, lively companions that are popular as family dogs. Their natural suspicion of strangers, alertness, agility, and strength make them formidable guard dogs. They sometimes appear at dog agility or dog obedience trials and flyball events. These strong and intelligent animals have also been used as service dogs, guide dogs for the blind, therapy dogs, police dogs in K9 units, and occasionally herding cattle or sheep. The versatility of Boxers was recognized early on by the military, which has used them as messenger dogs, pack carriers, and attack and guard dogs in times of war.

== Notable Boxers ==
- Punch and Judy were awarded the Dickin Medal for conspicuous gallantry or devotion to duty while serving in a military conflict.

== See also ==
- List of dog breeds
