= South American dogs =

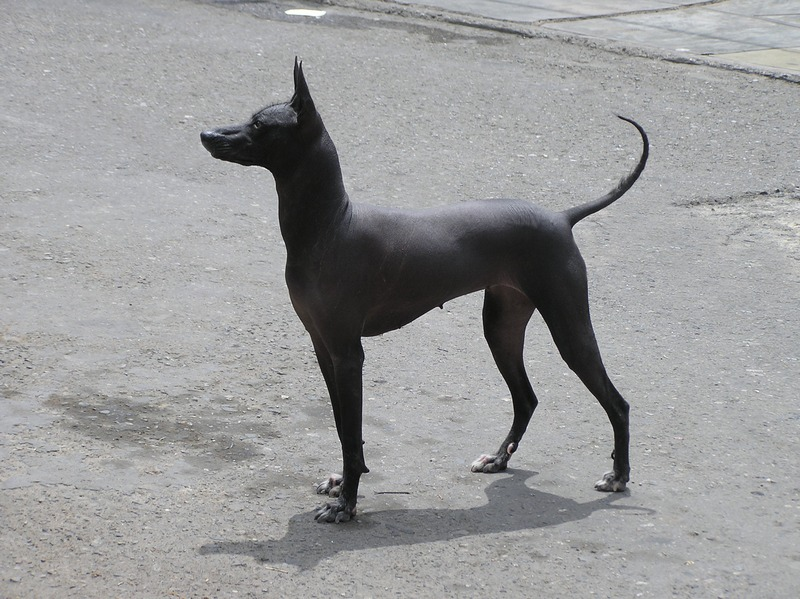
Peruvian Hairless Dog

The domestic dog was introduced to South America between 5,500 and 2,500 BCE from North America. They occupied the Andes region and spread into the Amazonian Basin relatively recently, in the 20th century. Today, very few of the original South American dogs remain, mostly replaced with introduced breeds from Eurasia.

== History ==
Dogs were brought to the Americas about 10,000 years BCE (Before Common Era) and made their way to South America sometime between 7,500 and 4,500 BCE. While American dogs were once believed to be descended from American grey wolves, recent studies have concluded that the Native American dogs descend from Eurasian grey wolves and were brought to America when the first peoples migrated there from Siberia. At this time, about five founding lineages of dogs crossed into the Americas, seen in the mtDNA of ancient dog remains.

The Peruvian Hairless Dog, an indigenous breed, probably made its way to South America after 500 BCE. They are closely related to the Xoloitzcuintle, a breed of dog indigenous to Mexico. They are also believed to be closely related to the Chiribaya Dog, another indigenous breed that is now extinct. The Peruvian Hairless dog was believed to have supernatural abilities and could see spirits as well as act as a psychopomp, a guide to the afterlife, and thus was often buried with people of high status.

In 1913, Colonel Percy Fawcett claimed to encounter a dog with two noses in the Amazon rainforest. Colonel John Blashford-Snell confirmed the existence of such a breed, the double-nosed Andean tiger hound, while in Bolivia in 2005. These dogs may have descended from the Pachón Navarro, a Spanish breed of hunting dog occasionally exhibiting a double nose.

== Common breeds ==
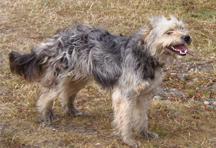
Patagonian Sheepdog.

- Chiribaya Dog (Extinct)
- Peruvian Hairless Dog
- Argentine Dogo
- Brazilian Mastiff
- Brazilian Terrier
- Cimarron Uruguayo
- Argentine Pila Dog
- Rastreador Brasileiro
- Patagonian Sheepdog
- Ecuadorian Hairless Dog
- Chilean Terrier
- Dogue Brasileiro
- Perro Pampa Argentino
- Argentine Pila
- Córdoba Fighting Dog (Extinct)
- Argentine Polar Dog (Extinct)

== Modern dogs ==
Today, most dogs in South America are of European descent, the only indigenous breed being the Peruvian Hairless dog. This is especially visible in free-ranging dogs, which are mostly descended from European dogs with traces of pre-Columbian dog DNA.

== Ancient dogs ==
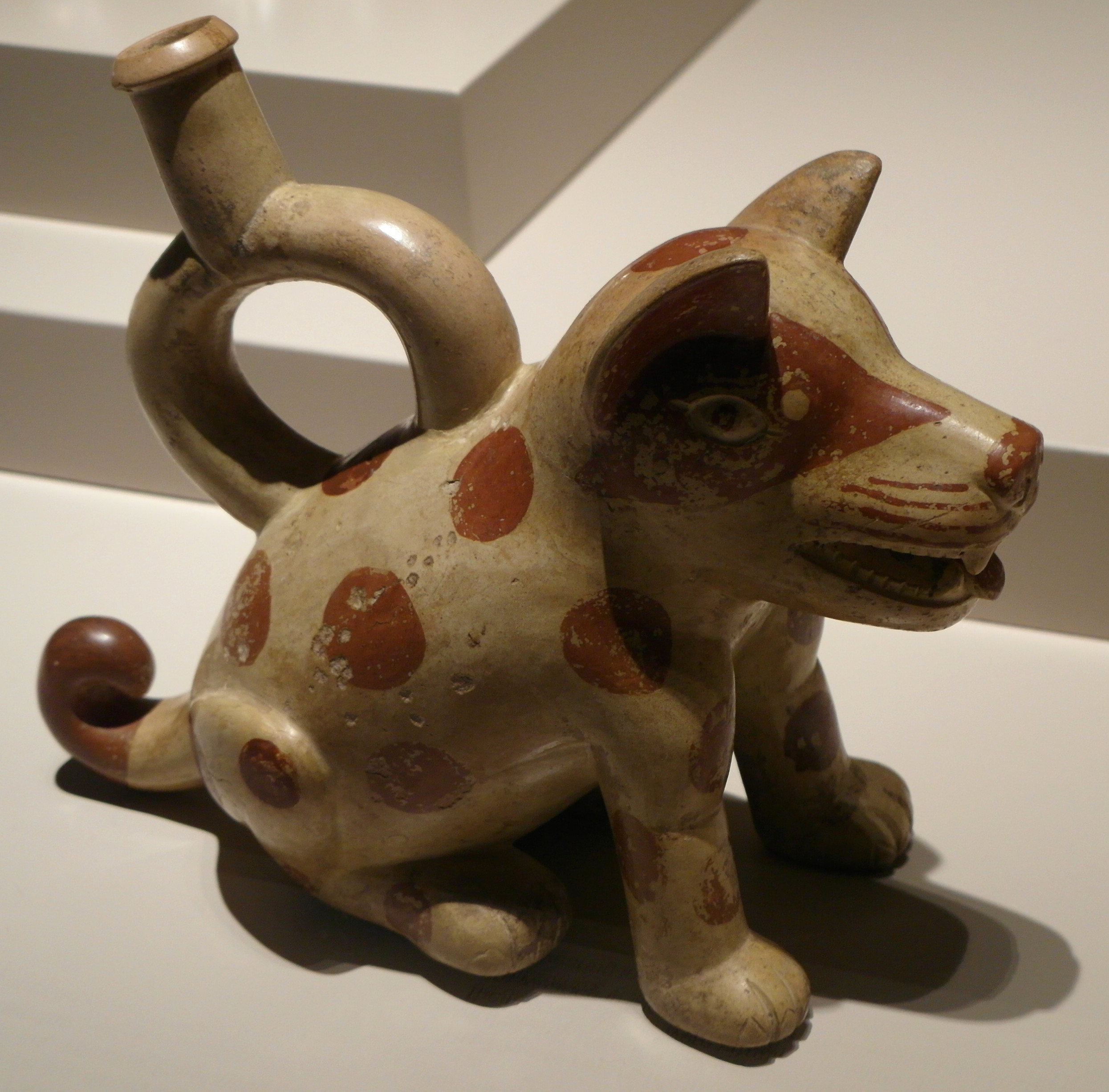
Moche ceramic dog.

=== Moche culture ===
The Moche people of northern Peru lived from 200 BCE to 800 CE, mostly within the Early Intermediate Period of South America. Imagery of black and white spotted dogs are commonly found on ceramics, textiles, and metal artifacts. A significant site associated with the Moche culture is called Sipán. The site is most famous for the burial of the Lord of Sipán. In this burial, remains of a dog can be found at the feet of the lord, a common occurrence since 1030 BCE, possibly to act as a psychopomp.

=== Nazca culture ===
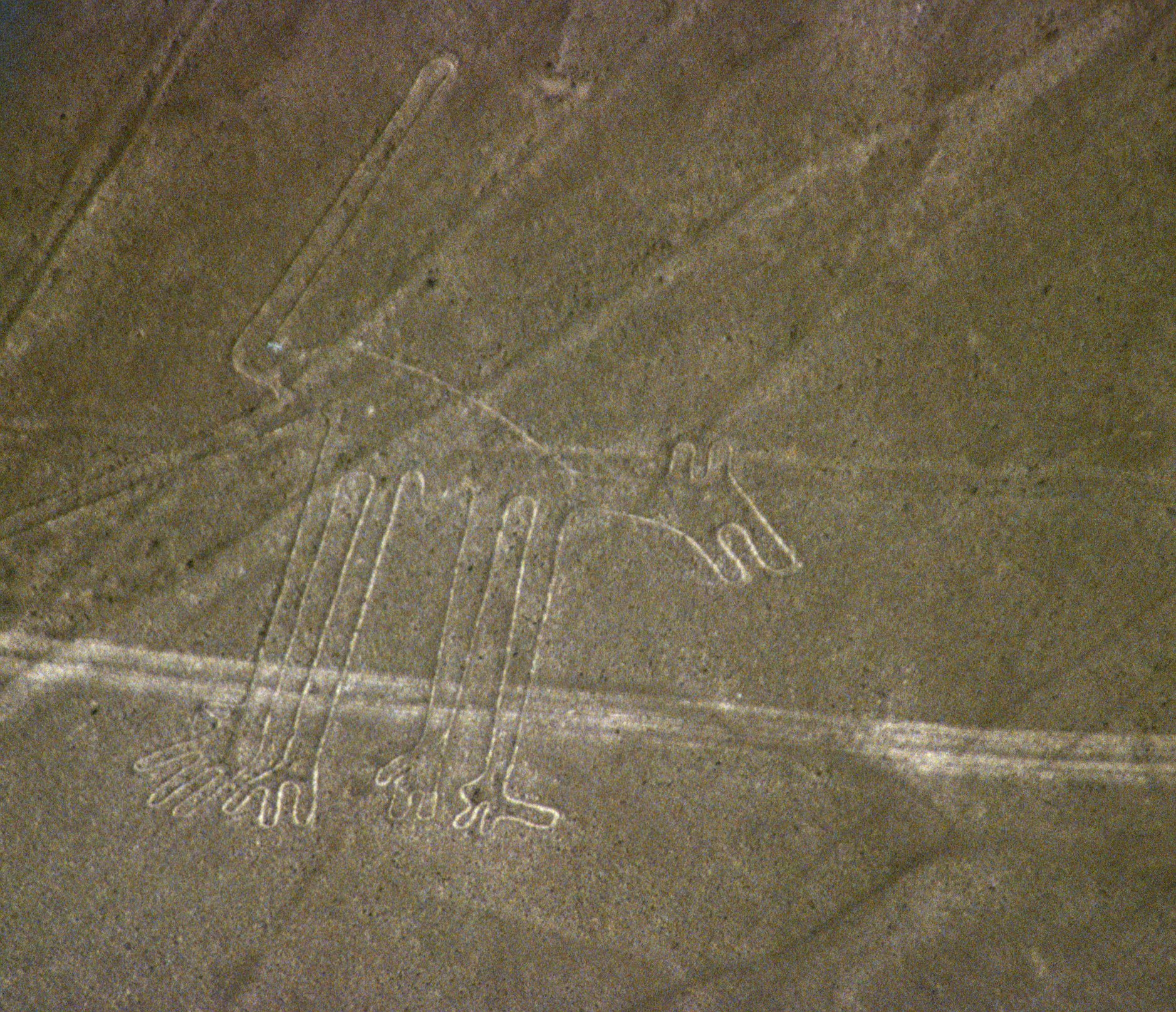
The Dog in the Nazca Lines

The Nazca culture, also from the Early Intermediate Period, are best known today for the Nazca Lines, huge images made in the desert sands on the coasts of Peru, one of which is a dog. In pottery, the iconography of dogs was similar to that of the Moche, seen in black and white spotted dogs.

=== Pachacamac ===
While not from a distinct culture, Pachacamac is a very important pilgrimage site located in Peru and inhabited 200 BCE to contact. Found here are the burials of over 100 dogs. Signs of violence on the deceased dogs show that they acted as sacrifices, and were often buried with other sacrificed women known as Virgins of the Sun. Of the dogs buried there, at least four different genetic morphotypes (breeds) can be found. This implies that many of the dogs were not locally bred and, in fact, came from all across the Andes. As a high trafficked site of pilgrimage, this means that people would have come here with their dogs and offered them as sacrifices here.

=== Tiwanaku culture ===
The Tiwanaku culture, located mainly in Bolivia, reached their height in the Middle Horizon about 1,000 years ago. While the largest site is located in Tiwanaku, a dog burial at the site of Rio Muerto offers good evidence about their relationship with dogs. Beneath the foundation of a house, the mummified dog was found curled in a sleeping position on top of a woven mat, a junco. The presence of bug pupae implies that the dog was not immediately buried upon death but was instead left exposed for a while. Reviewing religion and mortuary practices in the Andes, this is known to be common among those of high-ranking status. Upon an isotopic analysis of the remains, it was found that the dog was well fed on a diet of seafood, even though the site is located kilometers away from the sea, meaning the dogs owners had access to these resources and could afford to feed their dog an expensive diet.

=== Chiribaya culture ===
The remains of dogs in association with the Chiribaya culture (900-1350 CE) are most commonly found at a site near Ilo where the mummified remains of 43 dogs can be found alongside human burials. These mummies are excellently preserved and physical characteristics like fur color can be observed. The dogs found here are now known as the Chiribaya Dog or Chiribaya Shepherd, a now extinct breed. Their place within the Chiribaya culture is not totally understood, however, it is hypothesized that they helped herd camelids. While dogs are not needed to herd llamas and alpacas, it is likely that the Chiribaya Shepherd acted as a protector to the flocks and a companion to the people watching them.

=== Huanca culture ===
The Huanca culture lived in the Late Horizon Period and were later incorporated into the Inca Empire. They believed that they were descended from dogs and revered them as holy. They were given special status and were consumed during rituals. This was later discouraged by the Inca when they became part of the empire.

=== Inca culture ===
The most well-known culture of South America is that of the Inca Empire, active through the Late Horizon until their fall to the Spanish in the 16th century. The Inca, and others, often associated the dog with the Moon. They were believed to be the loyal followers of lunar deities due to the habit of howling at the Moon. When lunar eclipses occurred, dogs were beaten in order to bring back the Moon as the Moon was believed to hold affection for dogs and would come back to save them. The Moon was often more important along the coasts of Peru because of the relationship with the tides. This is comparative to the higher status of dogs along the coast as opposed to the highlands of the Andes.

Machu Picchu, now a popular tourist attraction of Peru, holds the burials of several people, mostly women, alongside dogs. The completeness of the skeletons and lack of butchering leads most to believe that they were kept as companions.

=== Yahgan and Selk'nam culture ===
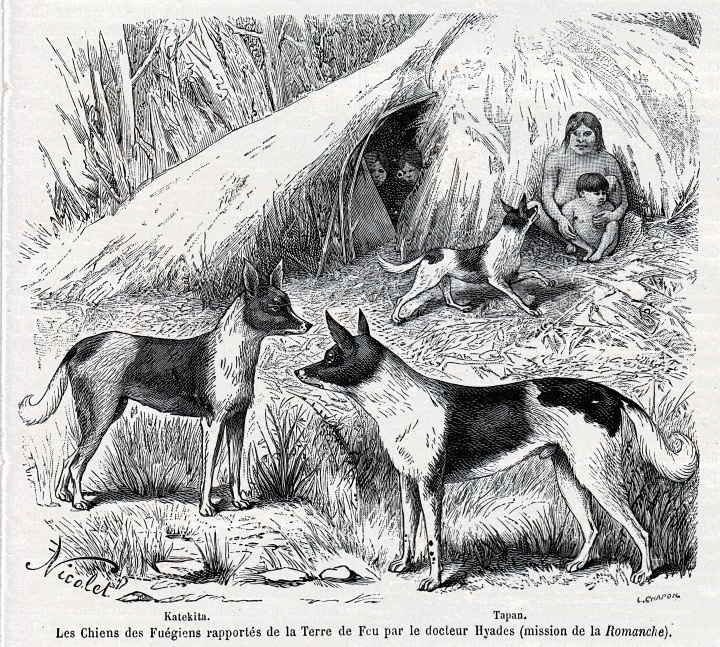
Two Fuegian dogs: Katekita (female) and Tapan (male)

The Yahgan and Selkʼnam peoples of Tierra del Fuego (Argentina and Chile), domesticated an extinct type of canine known as Fuegian Dog. It was bred and domesticated from the culpeo. Julius Popper, a prominent perpetrator of the Selknam genocide, said that the dogs did not protect their owners nor were hostile in any circumstances. Antonio Coiazzi reported that they were used in hunting by the indigenous and later research confirmed that. Darwin commented in his 1839 work The Voyage of the Beagle that he had been told by a native child that they caught otters for them. Popper also commented that he saw the Selkʼnam using them for warmth as a sort of wrapping.

They were driven to extinction during the Selknam genocide, when they were hunted down by European ranchers and headhunters due to their use in hunting and home making among the Selk'nam.

== Archaeological sites ==
- Sipán
- Huaca del Sol
- Pontal da Barra complex
- Rio Muerto
- Pachacamac
- Ilo
- Sonhuayo, Chanka site near modern Andahuaylas
- Machu Picchu
- Chenque I near Lihue Calel National Park
- Angostura I in Patagonia
- Huaca Cao Viejo, part of the El Brujo Complex

== Relationship with endemic canids ==
=== Symbolism ===
In the Andes, dogs and other canids were often conceptualized very differently, wild canids being more mythical; sometimes the fox was called the dog of the ancestors or the younger brother of the puma. The Nazca people often depicted them as anthropomorphic beings in their artwork whereas dogs were depicted in their natural form.

The Inca used a constellation called the atoq, the “fox”, to keep track of the seasons for agricultural purposes. Also at this time, it was believed that fox’s howl would foretell the success of the harvest based on time of the year. If it howled in the fall, the harvest would be plentiful, if in the Spring, the harvest would fail. Foxes were also characterized as being tricksters, like the coyote in North American folklore.

=== Taming ===
Dogs are noticeably absent from the Amazonian Basin until quite recently. The earliest evidence for dogs in Brazil in dated between 1,701 and 1,526 years cal BP. It is possible that indigenous people of the Amazon chose not to introduce the domestic dog because of their higher mortality rate in the dense forests or because they already had another canid that filled the dog’s niche.

The endemic canids of South America include:

- Short-eared dog (Atelocynus microtis)
- Crab-eating fox (Cerdocyon thous)
- Maned wolf (Chrysocyon brachyurus)
- Falkland Islands wolf (Dusicyon australis), now extinct
- Culpeo (Lycalopex culpaeus)
- Darwin's fox (Lycalopex fulvipes)
- South American gray fox (Lycalopex griseus)
- Pampas fox (Lycalopex gymnocercus)
- Sechuran fox (Lycalopex sechurae)
- Hoary fox (Lycalopex vetulus)
- Bush dog (Speothos venaticus)
- Dusicyon avus, now extinct

The taming of canids has been recounted by native people in the Amazon and historical documentation of “mute dogs” that didn’t bark support this. Some human burials have been found in association with fox remains, indicating that they were purposefully buried together. While these canids were never domesticated, there was an obvious bond between them, as if they were man and dog.

== See also ==
- Native American Dogs
- Dogs in Mesoamerica
