= Abyssinian sand terrier =

African hairless dog
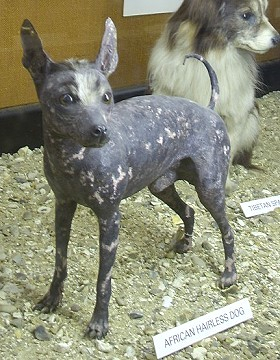
- An African hairless dog at the Natural History Museum at Tring
- Other names: Abyssinian sand dog Abyssinian sand terrier Abessijnse zandterrier African elephant dog African sand dog Egyptian hairless dog Zulu sand dog
- Origin: Africa
- Breed status: Extinct
Traits
- Coat: Hairless

African hairless dogs, also known as Abyssinian sand terriers and African sand dogs among many other names, were hairless dogs from Africa. It is unknown if any examples still exist.

This "breed" of dog is known for being “semi-wild”, meaning they tend to follow rather than live with the cattle breeders; though they occasionally serve as valuable companions on hunting trips. The many names of this “breed” include the words Egyptian, Abyssinian, and Zulu, which simply suggests that the genes for hairlessness have appeared independently in multiple areas of the continent as a cooling system in high heat.

A number of early European accounts from Africa mention a small hairless dog. It was described as fast moving with a short, sharp bark, and it was said to be either sandy-coloured or blue-black. Contemporary reports indicated that it may or may not have had a crest of stiff hair on its head and a tuft of hair on its tail, although photographs of it fail to show any hair. Three examples were brought to Britain in 1833 and were displayed at the London Zoo as Egyptian Hairless Dogs; a specimen dating from 1903 is preserved at the Natural History Museum at Tring in Hertfordshire, England. These accounts of the African hairless dogs suggest that they were encountered across the continent. They are believed to be extinct, although no thorough search has been conducted across Africa to confirm that they no longer exist.

== See also ==
- American Hairless Terrier
- Argentine Pila
- Chinese Crested Dog
- Peruvian Inca Orchid
- Xoloitzcuintle
