= Indian dog =

Indian dog may refer to:

- Indian pariah dog, the native landrace dog in India.
- Dhole of India, also known as the Indian Wild Dog, Cuon alpinus
- Hare Indian dog, an extinct dog breed originally kept by the Hare Indians of Canada
- Carolina Dog of the Southeast United States
- Native American dogs, a number of now-extinct breeds once kept as pets by American Indians
- Rez dogs, wild dogs on Indian reservations in the United States
