= Native American dogs =

Dogs living with indigenous Americans

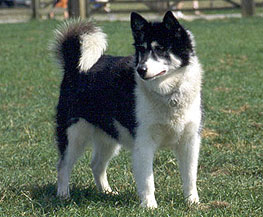
Canadian Eskimo Dog.

Native American dogs, or Pre-Columbian dogs, were dogs living with people indigenous to the Americas. Arriving about 10,000 years ago alongside Paleo-Indians, today they make up a fraction of dog breeds that range from the Alaskan Malamute to the Peruvian Hairless Dog.

== Origins ==
The earliest evidence for dogs in the Americas can be found in Danger Cave, Utah, a site which has been dated to between 9,000 and 10,000 years BC. These New World dogs have been shown to descend from Old World Eurasian grey wolves.

In 2018, a study compared sequences of North American dog fossils with Siberian dog fossils and modern dogs. The nearest relative to the North American fossils was a 9,000 BC fossil discovered on Zhokhov Island, Arctic north-eastern Siberia, which was connected to the mainland at that time. The study inferred from mDNA that all of the North American dogs shared a common ancestor dated 14,600 BC, and this ancestor had diverged along with the ancestor of the Zhokhov dog from their common ancestor 15,600 BC. The timing of the Koster dogs shows that dogs entered North America from Siberia 4,500 years after humans did, were isolated for the next 9,000 years, and after contact with Europeans these no longer exist because they were replaced by Eurasian dogs.

It is theorized that there were four separate introductions of the dog over the past nine thousand years, in which five different lineages were founded in the Americas.

The aboriginal dogs of the Native Americans were described as looking and sounding like wolves. The Hare Indian dog is suspected by one author of being a domesticated coyote from its historical description. At Arroyo Hondo Pueblo in northern New Mexico during the 14th century AD, several coyotes seem to have been treated identically to domestic dogs.

One of the most ancient dog breeds of the Americas, the Xoloitzcuintle (or 'Xolo' for short), accompanied the earliest migrants from Asia and had developed into the breed seen today in Mexico by at least 3,500 years ago.

In South America, the introduction of the dog took place sometime between 7,500 and 4,500 BP (5550–2550 BC). Findings for dogs in South America get only denser by 3,500 BP (1550 BC) but seem to be restricted to agricultural areas in the Andes. The oldest finding of a dog for Brazil is radiocarbon dated to between 1701 and 1526 cal BP (249–424 AD), and for the Pampas of Argentina the oldest is dated as 930 BP (1020 AD). In Peru, depictions of Peruvian hairless dogs appear around 750 AD on Moche ceramic vessels and continue in later Andean ceramic traditions.

== Historical purposes ==
Culinary

There are numerous historical accounts of indigenous peoples eating dog meat. In their journals from their 1804–1806 expedition through western North America, both Meriwether Lewis and William Clark mention dog consumption by many of the indigenous tribes they encountered.

Hunting

The Tahltan Bear Dog was bred to hunt larger game.

Herding

In the Andes region of South America, some cultures like the Chiribaya and Inca used herding dogs, such as the Chiribaya Dog.

Lap dogs and companions

Mexica nobility of Mexico occasionally kept tlalchichi, the direct ancestor of the modern Chihuahua breed, as pets. Some well-preserved and intact dog mummies and other burials with grave goods, such as blankets and food, have been interpreted as pertaining to dogs that were considered to have had familial status. At the Inca site of Machu Picchu, dogs with no evidence that would indicate sacrifice have been found in mortuary contexts with and near individuals of apparent high status.

Pulling

Some tribes utilized dogs for pulling travois. They pulled the game, tipi, and other items for their guardians.

Religious significance

In South America, several different cultures sacrificed dogs in religious ceremonies. At the site of Pachacamac in Peru, a popular place of pilgrimage and religious ritual best known for the presence of an oracle, archaeologists uncovered the burials of over a hundred dogs with physical signs of sacrifice. Dogs were sometimes considered to be psychopomps, guides to the afterlife, and were often buried with elite. The Peruvian hairless dog was believed to have supernatural abilities, such as the ability to see spirits, and was seen as a particularly good psychopomp. In Inca times, the dog was also heavily associated with the Moon and was sacrificed during lunar eclipses in order to bring the Moon back.

Osages had a clan that shaved their children's heads in three tails, each to symbolize a canid: dog, coyote, and wolf.

== Breeds and types ==
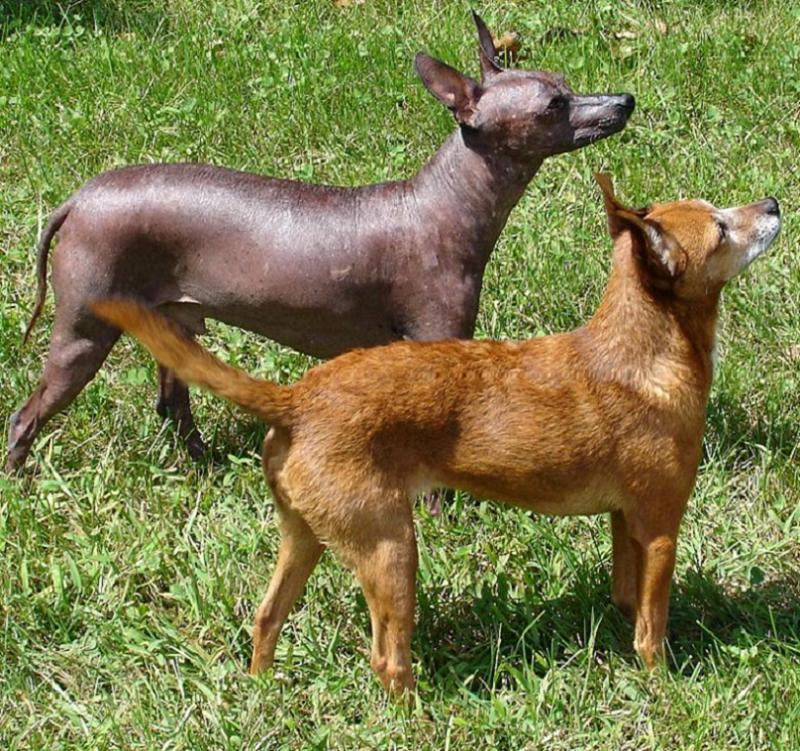
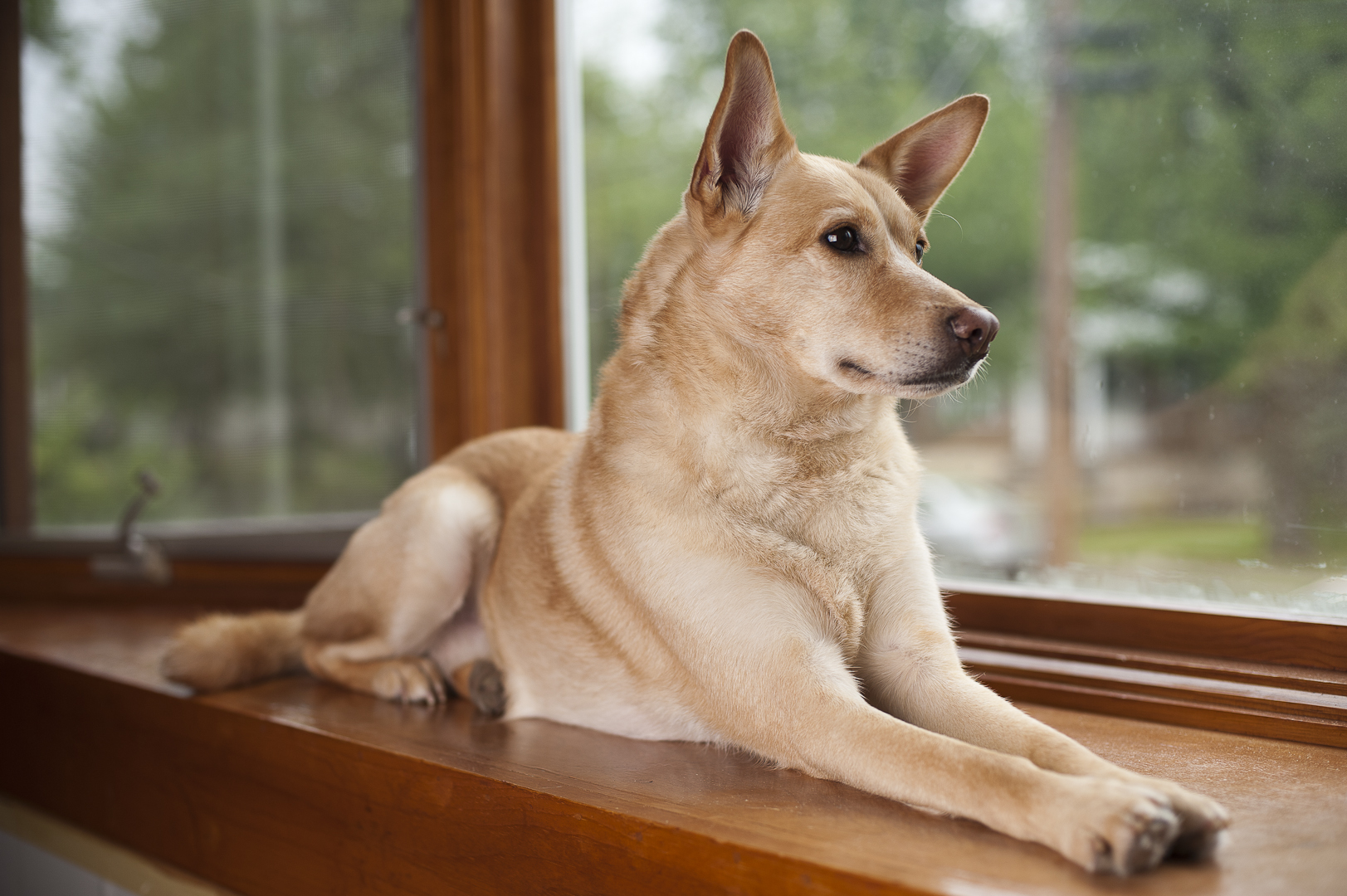
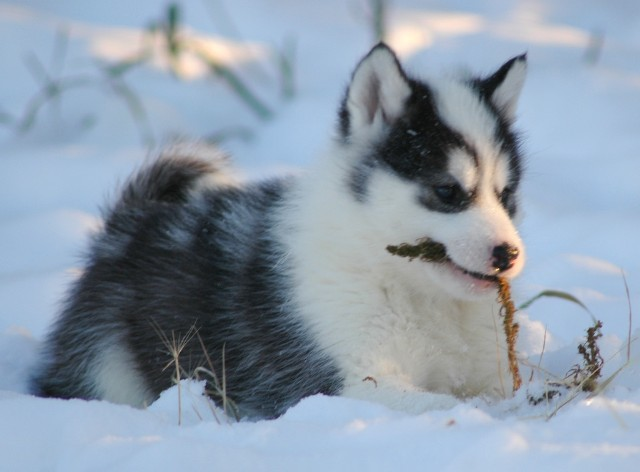
Top to bottom: Xoloitzcuintle, Carolina, and Canadian Eskimo dogs.

North America

- Chihuahua dog
- †Hare Indian dog
- †Salish Wool Dog
- †Tahltan Bear Dog
- †Techichi
- Alaskan Husky (66.6% Baikal or 36.4% Baikal + 21.4% Americas)
- Alaskan Malamute (46.4% Baikal + 27.2% Americas)
- Greenland Dog (63% Baikal + 18% Americas + 18% European)
- Canadian Eskimo Dog
- Xoloitzcuintle

South America

- †Chiribaya Dog
- Argentine Pila
- Peruvian Inca Orchid
- †Fuegian dog (domesticated culpeo)
- †Munutrú (A "small ugly hairy dog", used for yarn)
- †Tregua (Also known as thregua, possible precursor to modern "quiltros". Used for hunting)

Caribbean

- †Alcos

Breeds with dubious or lower-than-expected amounts of Native American ancestry

- Carolina Dog some mtDNA evidence; but nuclear SNP indicates 36% New Guinea Singing Dog, 62% European, the rest mainly attributed to the Old World)
- Chinook; a newer analysis indicates about 12% Baikal or Americas and about 88% German Shepherd.
- Chihuahua some mtDNA evidence; but nuclear SNP only has ~4% native content, being mainly European
- Xoloitzcuintle some mtDNA evidence; but nuclear SNP only shows ~3% native contribution, mainly European

Breeds falsely advertised as Native American-originated

- American Eskimo Dog
- Calupoh
- Northern Inuit Dog

Breeds potentially having partial Native American origins

- Catahoula leopard dog

Breeds showing up as having Native-American-like genetics due to being from Asia

- Chow Chow (up to 57% "Americas" nuclear SNP, but can be alternatively decomposed as "Baikal"; the rest being New Guinea Singing Dog, European, and Iran/Samara/Ashkelon)

== Modern times ==
Today, most Native American dog breeds have gone extinct, mostly replaced by dogs of European descent. The few breeds that have been identified as Native American, such as the Inuit Sled Dog, the Eskimo Dog, the Greenland Dog and the Carolina Dog have remained mostly genetically unchanged since contact in the 15th century in their mtDNA. However, the autosomal content of the Carolina Dog has been diluted significantly.

Modern free-ranging dogs differ in origin from North to South America. In North America, the Carolina dog has mtDNA links to East Asian dogs, with a shared haplotype with the Shiba Inu in Japan. This suggests that it migrated to North America through Beringia, therefore making it a Native American dog. In South America, on the other hand, free-ranging dogs are almost entirely of European descent.

== See also ==
- Dogs in Mesoamerica
- Canine transmissible venereal tumor
- Dusicyon avus, which is not a dog but probably a tamed canid.
- Feist
- Rez dog
