= Hairless dog =

Dog with disposition for hairlessness

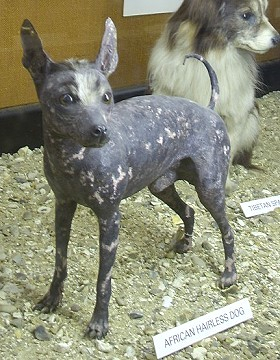
An African hairless dog at the Walter Rothschild Zoological Museum, Tring, England

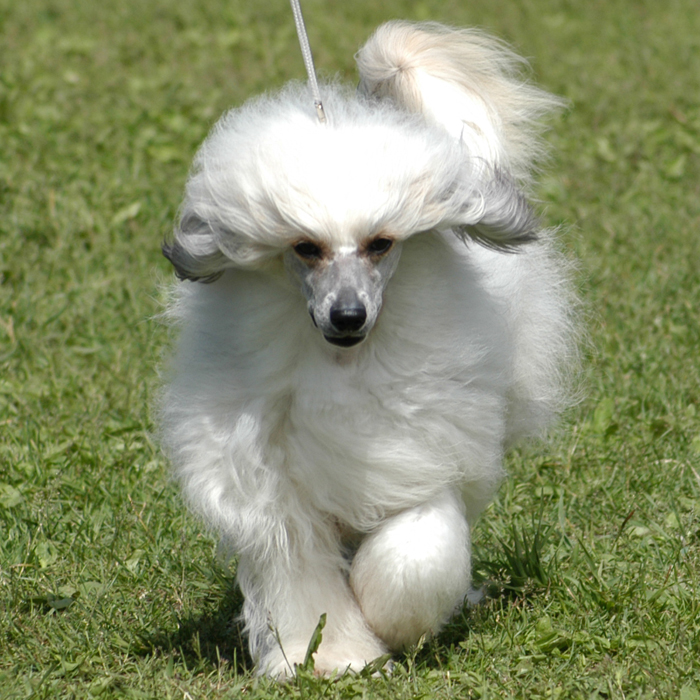
The Chinese Crested Dog's coated variety is called a "Powderpuff" and is a recognized type

A hairless dog is a dog with a genetic disposition for hairlessness and hair loss. There are two known types of genetic hairlessness, a dominant and a recessive type. The dominant type is caused by ectodermal dysplasia as a result of a mutation in the FOXI3 autosomal gene.

== Dominant genes ==
Dogs with dominant genes for hairlessness can pass their attributes to their offspring in natural conditions; that is, not under the control of humans. Therefore, it is possible that, in some parts of the world, groups of hairless dogs came into existence without human intervention. Later in history, people developed these groups into recognized breeds.

Worldwide recognized breeds at this time are the Chinese Crested Dog, the Xoloitzcuintle (Mexican Hairless Dog), the Peruvian Inca Orchid.

The Argentine Pila, the Hairless Khala from Bolivia, and the Ecuadorian Hairless Dog are not registered hairless dog breeds.

Other breeds that were said to have existed in the past were the African hairless dog (also known as the Abyssinian sand terrier, Egyptian hairless dog and African elephant dog, the last being a reference to its grey skin) and the Siamese Hairless Dog.

This type of genetic structure is said to be homozygous pre-natal lethal for the dominant gene. This means that zygotes with two dominant genes cannot live. Therefore, all dominant-hairless dogs have a heterozygous gene structure. This allows a homozygous recessive type to persist, which is the coated variety.

For dogs where hairlessness is a dominant gene, hairless to hairless matings will on average produce 66.6% hairless and 33.3% coated puppies. For hairless to coated matings, there will be an average of 50%/50% coated to hairless ratio, while for coated to coated matings, all puppies will be coated.

The Chinese Crested Dog's coated variety is called a "Powderpuff" and is a recognized type. The coated variety of the Xoloitzcuintle is recognized as a valid type for conformation showing with some registries, including the AKC. Coated varieties of the other breeds may or may not be recognized as valid varieties for conformation showing, depending on the breed and show or registry organization.

== Hairless dog breeds ==
- American Hairless Terrier
- Argentine Pila
- Chinese Crested Dog
- Hairless Khala
- Jonangi
- Peruvian Inca Orchid
- Xoloitzcuintle
- Ecuadorian Hairless Dog

== Gallery ==
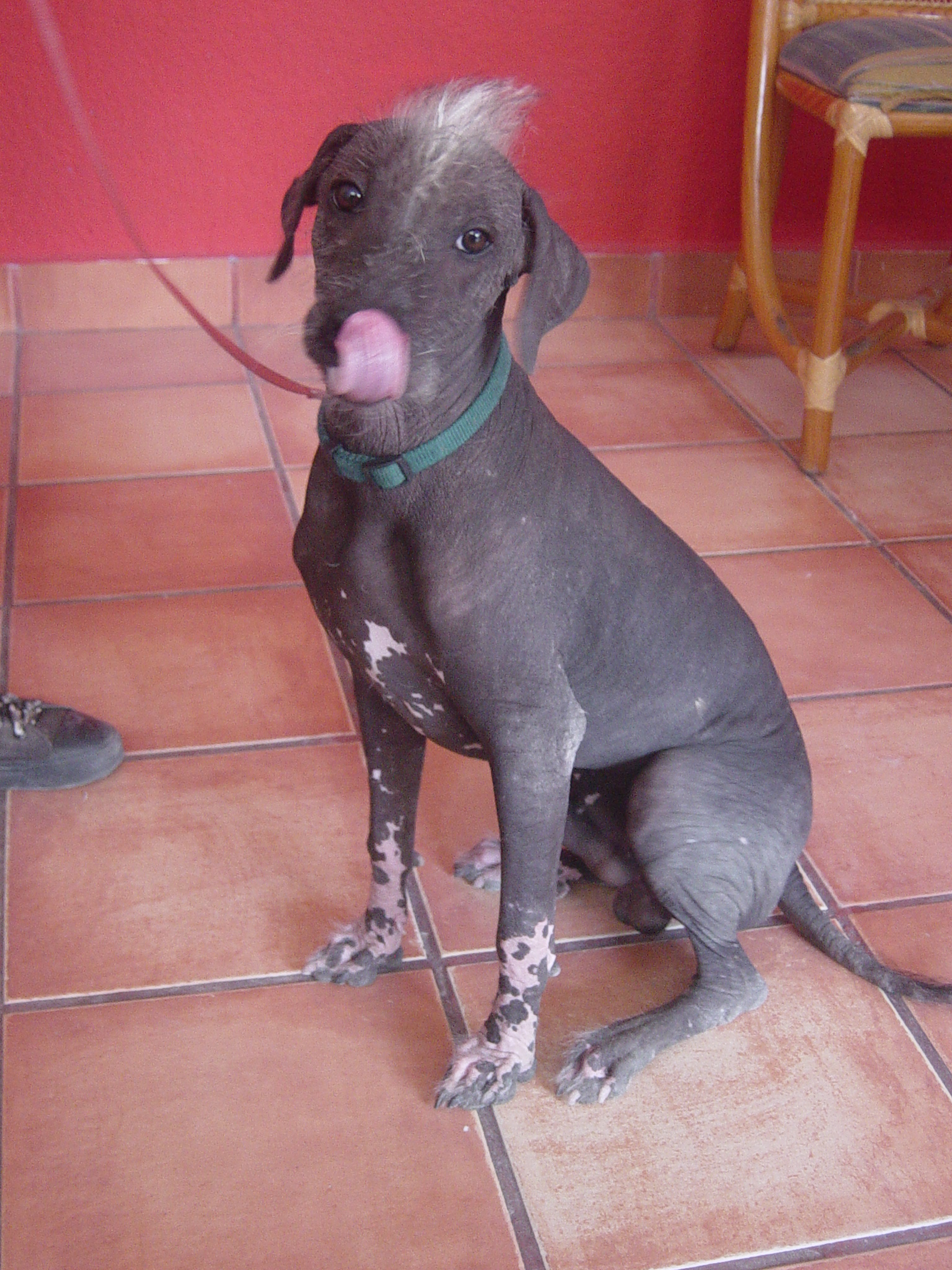
Xoloitzcuintle

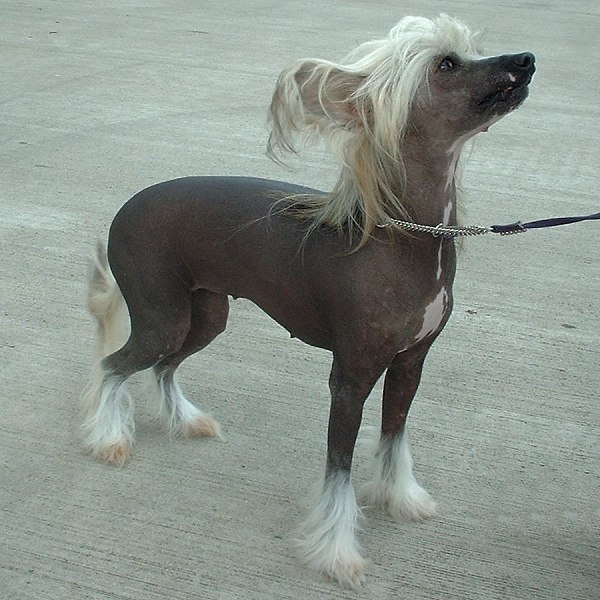
Chinese Crested Dog

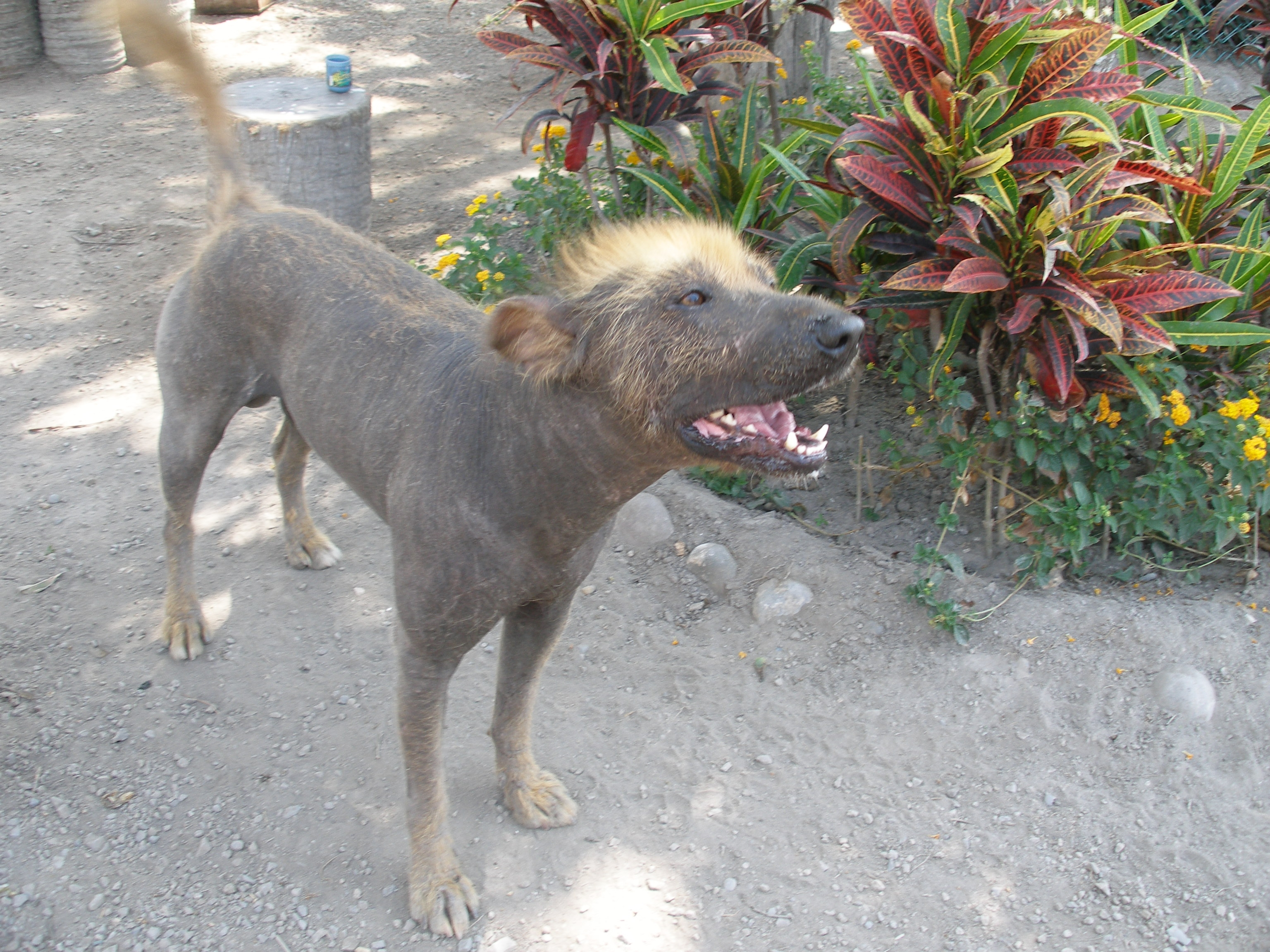
Peruvian Inca Orchid

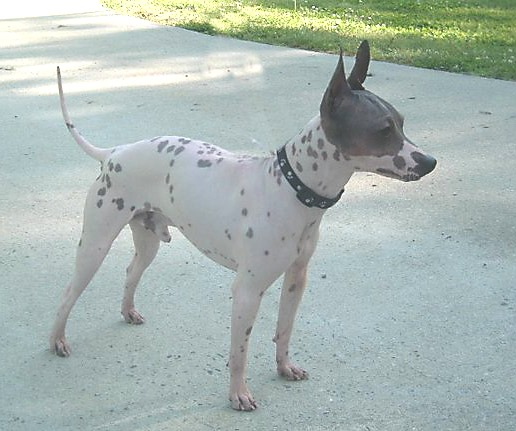
American Hairless Terrier
