= FOXI3 =

Protein-coding gene in the species Homo sapiens

Identifiers
- Aliases: FOXI3, forkhead box I3
- External IDs: OMIM: 612351; MGI: 3511278; GeneCards: FOXI3

Gene location (Human)
Chr.	Chromosome 2 (human)
Band	2p11.2	Start	88,446,787 bp
Band	2p11.2	End	88,452,693 bp

Gene location (Mouse)
Chr.	Chromosome 6 (mouse)
Band	6|6 C1	Start	70,933,515 bp
Band	6|6 C1	End	70,938,050 bp
RNA expression pattern
Bgee	Human / Mouse (ortholog); Top expressed in: gonad; placenta; testicle; ganglionic eminence; anterior pituitary; skin of abdomen; skin of leg; renal cortex / Top expressed in: pharyngeal pouch; cervical loop; stellate reticulum; hair follicle; salivary gland; epiblast; inner enamel epithelium; surface ectoderm; embryo; lens; More reference expression data
BioGPS	n/a
Gene ontology
Molecular function	DNA-binding transcription factor activity; sequence-specific DNA binding; DNA binding; DNA-binding transcription factor activity, RNA polymerase II-specific
Cellular component	nucleus
Biological process	regulation of transcription, DNA-templated; transcription, DNA-templated; regulation of transcription by RNA polymerase II; anatomical structure morphogenesis; cell differentiation
Sources:Amigo / QuickGO
Orthologs
Databases	NCBI: entry; OMA: entry
Species	Human	Mouse
Entrez	344167	232077
Ensembl	ENSG00000214336	ENSMUSG00000055874
UniProt	A8MTJ6	n/a
RefSeq (mRNA)	NM_001135649	NM_001101464
RefSeq (protein)	NP_001129121	n/a
Location (UCSC)	Chr 2: 88.45 – 88.45 Mb	Chr 6: 70.93 – 70.94 Mb
PubMed search
- Wikidata
View/Edit Human	View/Edit Mouse

Forkead box I3 (FOXI3) is a protein that in humans is encoded by the FOXI3 gene. FOXI3 is a forkhead box transcription factor that is expressed in the development of hair and teeth. One of its mutations is a dominant allele responsible for the heterozygous Hh hairless trait in dogs. It was identified in 2008.

== See also ==
- Chinese Crested Dog
- Mexican Hairless Dog
- Peruvian Inca Orchid (Peruvian Hairless Dog)
- Dog coat genetics
