= Carolina Dog =

Carolina dog
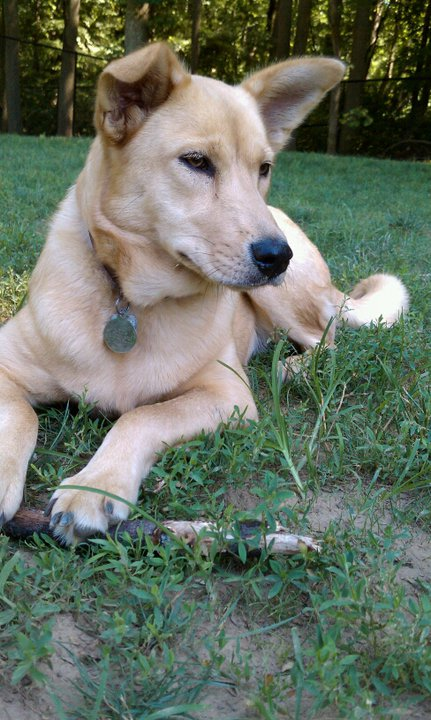
- Origin: United States
Traits
- Height: 17.75–19.5 in (45.1–49.5 cm)
- Weight: 30–55 lb (14–25 kg)
- Color: Preferable: red ginger with pale buff markings over the shoulders, and pale white along the muzzle.
Kennel club standards
- United Kennel Club: standard

The Carolina dog, also known as a yellow dog, yaller dog, American dingo, or Dixie dingo, is a breed of medium-sized dog occasionally found feral in the Southeastern United States, especially in isolated stretches of longleaf pines and cypress swamps. Efforts to establish them as a standardized breed have gained the Carolina Dog breed recognition in two smaller kennel clubs and full acceptance into the breed-establishment program of one major kennel club.

Originally a landrace breed, the Carolina dog was rediscovered living as a free-roaming population by I. Lehr Brisbin Jr., though originally documented in American dog-related publications in the 1920s. Carolina dogs show admixture with dog breeds from east Asia.

Despite the name, it is not the state dog of North Carolina (Plott Hound) or South Carolina (Boykin Spaniel).

== European encounter ==
One of the earliest publications to document the "Indian" dogs of North America was an article by Glover Morrill Allen in 1920. Allen postulated that these "Larger or Common Indian Dogs" were descended from Asian primitive dogs:

The probability therefore is, that the Domestic Dog originated in Asia and was carried by ancient peoples both east and west into all parts of the inhabited world. That this migration began in late Pleistocene times seems highly probable.

Allen cites late nineteenth-century studies of skeletal remains of dogs that could be found from Alaska to Florida to the Greater Antilles and westward to the Great Plains, and were excavated from Indian mounds as well:

Cope (1893) was the first to describe the jaw of this dog from a specimen collected by Moore from a shell-mound on the St. Johns River, Florida. He was struck by the fact that the first lower premolar was missing and appeared not to have developed. He also noticed strong development of the entoconid of the carnassial.
Moore, in the course of various explorations in Florida and Georgia discovered many remains of dogs, apparently of this type. In a large mound on Ossabaw Island, Georgia, he (1897) found several interments of human and dog-skeletons, the latter always buried separately and entire, showing that the dogs had not been used as food. Other dog-skeletons of a similar sort were found by Moore (1899) in aboriginal mounds on the South Carolina coast ... Putnam considered them the same as the larger Madisonville (Ohio) dogs.

These dogs were publicized by I. Lehr Brisbin Jr., a senior research ecologist at the University of Georgia's Savannah River Ecology Laboratory, who first came across a Carolina dog while working at the Savannah River Site, which was depopulated and secured of all trespass and traffic for decades beginning in 1950.

== Establishment and recognition ==
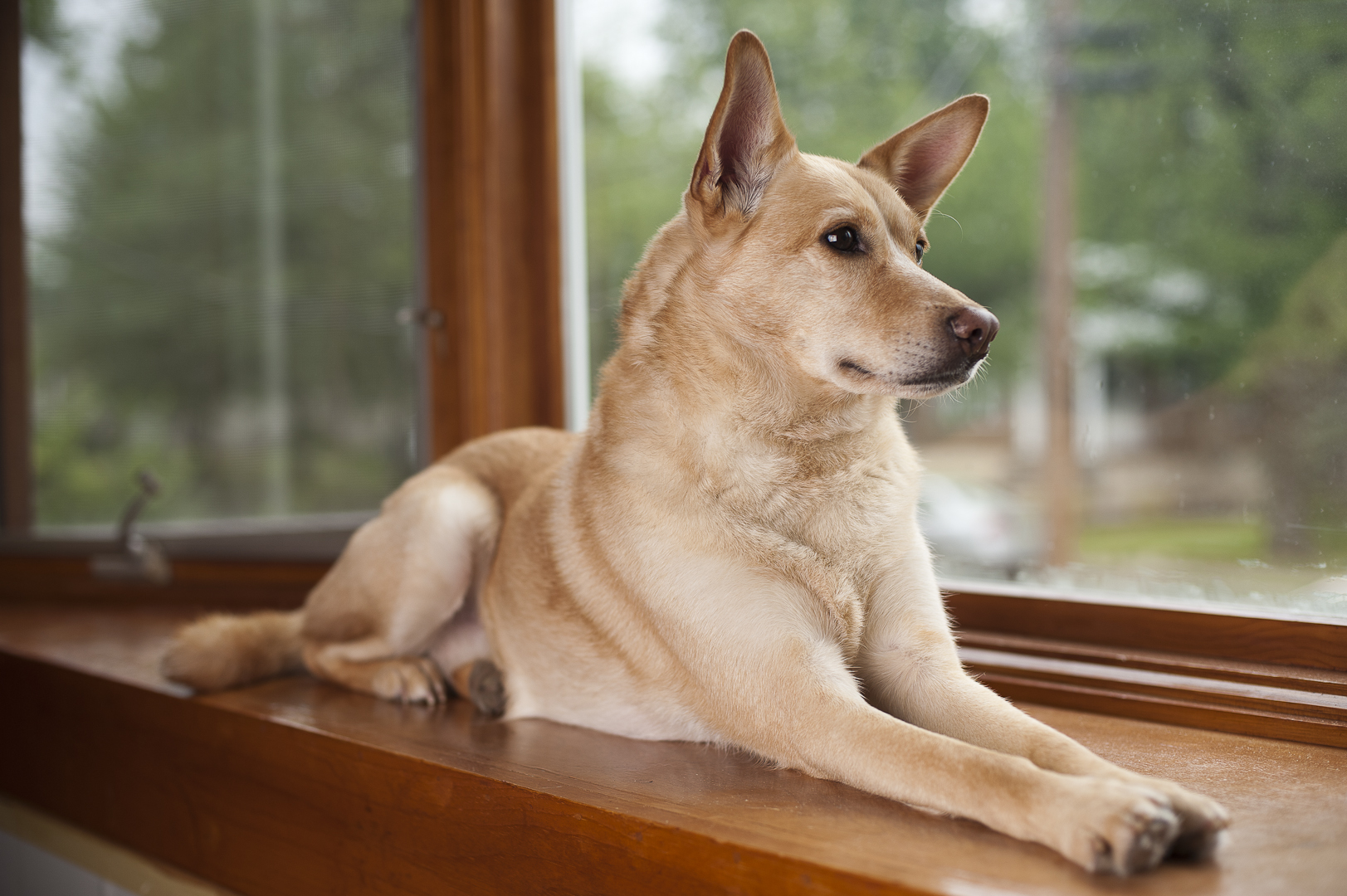
Pet Carolina dog at home

Since 1996, Carolina dogs can be registered with the United Kennel Club (UKC), which has published a detailed, formal Carolina Dog breed standard. UKC focuses on hunting dogs and other working dogs, and categorizes the Carolina in their "Sighthound & Pariah Group" (Note: In addition to the UKC category Sighthound & Pariah Group, see also the separate, more general categories sighthound and pariah dog.), along with other breeds such as the Basenji of Africa and the Thai Ridgeback. A breed standard has also been issued by the American Rare Breed Association (ARBA). ARBA includes the Carolina in their Group 5 along with the Canaan dog and the New Guinea singing dog.

In July 2017, the American Kennel Club (AKC, the largest dog breed registry in the United States) accepted the Carolina Dog breeding program into its Foundation Stock Service (FSS), the first step toward official AKC breed recognition. AKC has the dog listed under their "Hound" group.

== Description ==
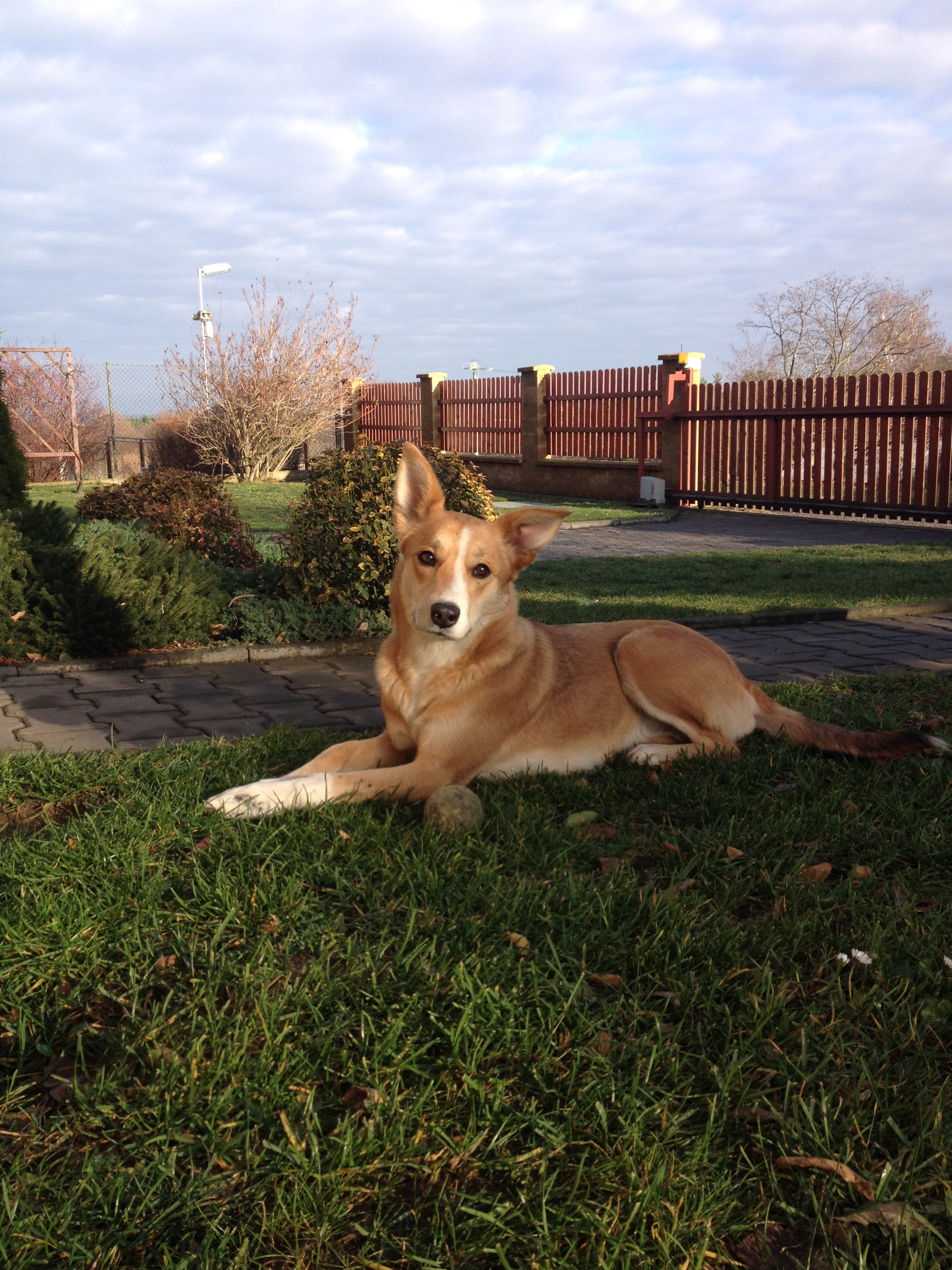
Pet Carolina dog at rest in a yard

Carolina dogs are medium-sized; their height ranges from 18 to 24 inches (46 to 61 cm), and weight from 35 to 50 pounds (16 to 23 kg). The ears are characteristic and are erect, very long, and moderately slender, tapering up to elegantly pointed tips, and they can be individually turned to the direction of any sound, providing extremely sensitive hearing. The dog ranges in build from muscular yet slender and graceful to somewhat stockier animals. The dogs' legs are also graceful, but strong. The hind midsection is firm and narrow. The overall build in a healthy, properly fed Carolina dog is svelte to somewhat stockier, strong and athletic. Paws are relatively large. The snout and the notably elongated, fox-like ears are spitz-like. The tail is usually upturned and often has a hooked kink in it. The coat is usually short and smooth, characteristic of a warm-climate dog.

Colors vary, and may include reddish ginger, buff, fawn, black-and-tan, or piebald with or without white areas on toes, chest, tail tip, and muzzle. The eyes are at an oblique angle and almond-shaped. They vary in color, but are usually dark brown or medium to dark orange. The area along the edges of the eyes is often (but not always) a distinctive black "eyeliner" coloration which becomes more pronounced by contrast in lighter-colored dogs. The lips are often black, even in light-colored dogs. Frequently, puppies have a melanistic mask that usually fades as the adult coat comes in.

== Behavior ==
=== Breeding in the wild ===
Female Carolina dogs have three estrus cycles in quick succession, which settle into seasonal reproductive cycles when there is an abundance of puppies. This is thought to ensure quick breeding in the wild before diseases, like heartworm, take their toll.

== DNA evidence ==
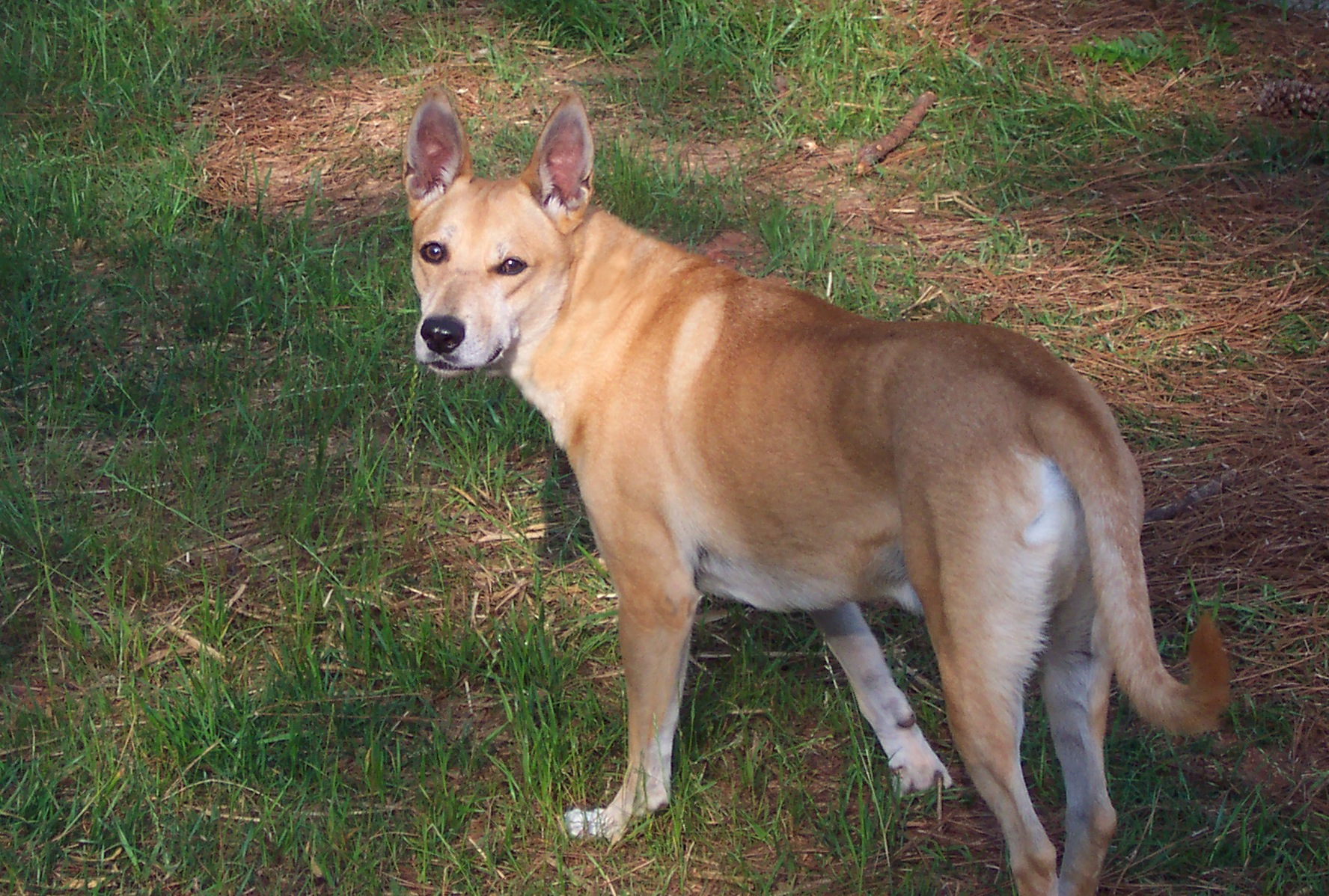
Carolina dog "Hunter" that participated in DNA testing

Brisbin (1997) conjectured that some of the Carolina dog's ancestors arrived with prehistoric Americans.

In 2013, a study looked at the mitochondrial DNA (mtDNA) (Note: Mitochondrial DNA (mtDNA) passes only along the maternal line, and can date back thousands of years. See Arora, et al. (2015)) sampled from Carolina dogs. The study showed that 58% of the dogs carried universal haplotypes (Note: A haplotype is a group of genes found in an organism that is inherited from only one of its parents, hence-for example, matrilinear mitochondrial DNA (mtDNA) in all animals, and in mammals, patrilinear Y-chromosomal DNA (yDNA).) that could be found around the world (haplotypes A16, A18, A19, and B1), 5% carried haplotypes associated with Korea and Japan (A39), and 37% carried a unique haplotype (A184) that had not been recorded before, and that is part of the a5 mtDNA sub-haplogroup that originated in East Asia. In contrast, the Australian dingo and the New Guinea singing dog both belong to haplotype A29 which is in the a2 sub-haplogroup, hence there is no recent genetic relationship in the mtDNA. Also in 2013, another study of several dog breeds in the Americas – among them the Carolina dog, the Peruvian Hairless Dog, and the Chihuahua indicated an ancient migration from East Asia.

In 2015, a study was conducted using mitochondrial (female lineage marker), Y-chromosome (male lineage marker), and autosomal genetic markers in 4,676 purebred dogs from 161 breeds and 549 village dogs from 38 countries. The study tested for the degree of admixture with European breed dogs. The study found no yDNA haplotypes indigenous to North American dogs outside of the Arctic. However, the mtDNA of Carolina dogs contained between 10%–35% pre-Columbian ancestry (mtDNA haplotype A184) that clustered with East Asian dogs.

In 2018, a study compared mtDNA sequences and nuclear SNPs of fossil North American dogs with fossil Siberian dogs and modern dogs. The study indicates that dogs entered North America from Siberia 4,500 years after humans first arrived, were isolated for 9,000 years, and were nearly wiped out after European contact when they were mostly replaced by Eurasian dogs; the pre-contact dogs exhibit a unique genetic signature that is now almost entirely gone, with their nearest genetic relatives being the Arctic dog breeds. Three Carolina dogs in the study exhibited up to 33% pre-contact/Arctic lineage, however the study could not rule out this being the result of admixture with modern Arctic dog breeds.

A 2020 study using qpAdm of nuclear SNPs of both main branches of modern dog breeds and ancient (bronze age and neolithic) dog bones found that the Carolina Dog's SNP content is best decomposed into 36% New Guinea Singing Dog, 62% European, with the rest mainly attributed to the Old World – very little support for Baikal/American contribution.

== See also ==
- Portal:Dogs
- Black mouth cur
- Canis lupus dingo
- Feist
- Free-ranging dog
- List of dog breeds
- Lurcher
- Native American dogs
- Nureongi
- Pariah dog
- Prey, Saari, Carolina Dog cast member of the 2022 movie
- Rare breed (dog)
- Rez dog
