= Calupoh =

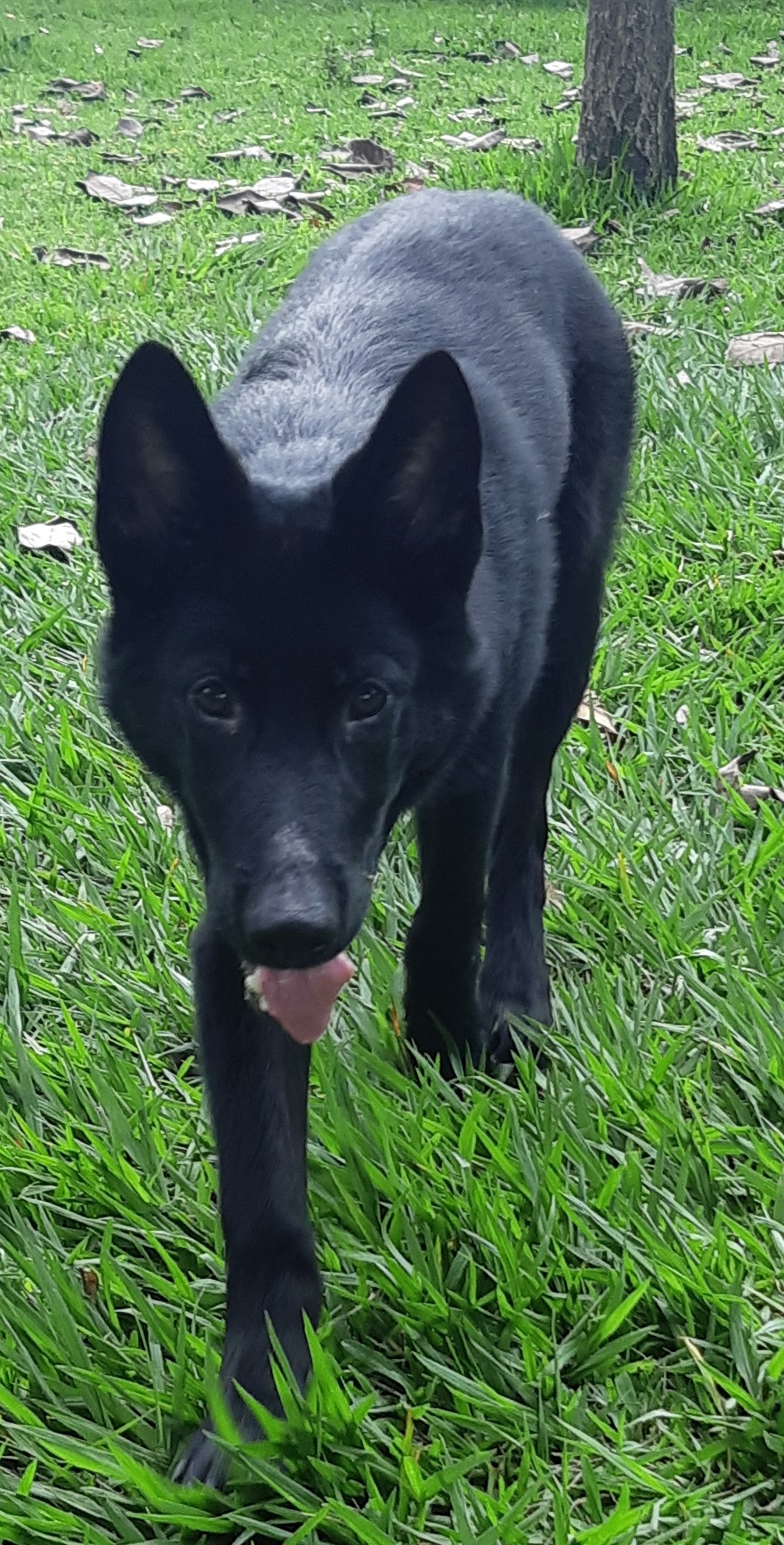
- Calupoh, frontal view
- Other names: Mexican Wolf-dog; Perro lobo mexicano; Mexican Black Wolfdog; Lupo negro
- Origin: Mexico
Traits
Height	Males	62–75 cm (24–30 in)
	Females	58–70 cm (23–28 in)
- Color: Black (desirable)
Kennel club standards
- Federación Canofila Mexicana: standard
- American Rare Breed Association: standard

The Calupoh is a canine breed native to Mexico. It was developed in the 1990s in a cultural heritage project intended to recreate the ancient Mexican wolfdogs mentioned in pre-Columbian texts and depicted in Mayan and Aztec artwork. In September 1999 it was recognized as a breed by the Federación Canófila Mexicana, the kennel club of Mexico, bringing the number of Mexican canine breeds to three – the others are the Chihuahua and the Xoloitzcuintle.

Despite being a breed with pre-Hispanic inspiration, the Calupoh was initially developed as mix of Mexican wolf with German Shepherd, the latter of which was non-existent in pre-Hispanic Mexico. Calupohs are recognized for their lupine appearance and stable temperament, though modern lines are purebred dogs bred to a standard, not actively crossed with wolves. With an early certification endorsed by the Federación Canófila Mexicana (Mexican Kennel Federation), its participation in competitions has been endorsed by breeding organization Criadero Caliente, under the initiative of Mexican politician Jorge Hank Rhon.
