= Río Muerto =

Coordinates: 26°18′28″S 61°39′16″W

- Municipality and village
- Interactive map of Río Muerto
- Country: Argentina
- Province: Chaco Province
- Time zone: UTC−3 (ART)

Río Muerto (literally Dead River) is a village and municipality in Chaco Province in northern Argentina.
