= Argentine Pila =

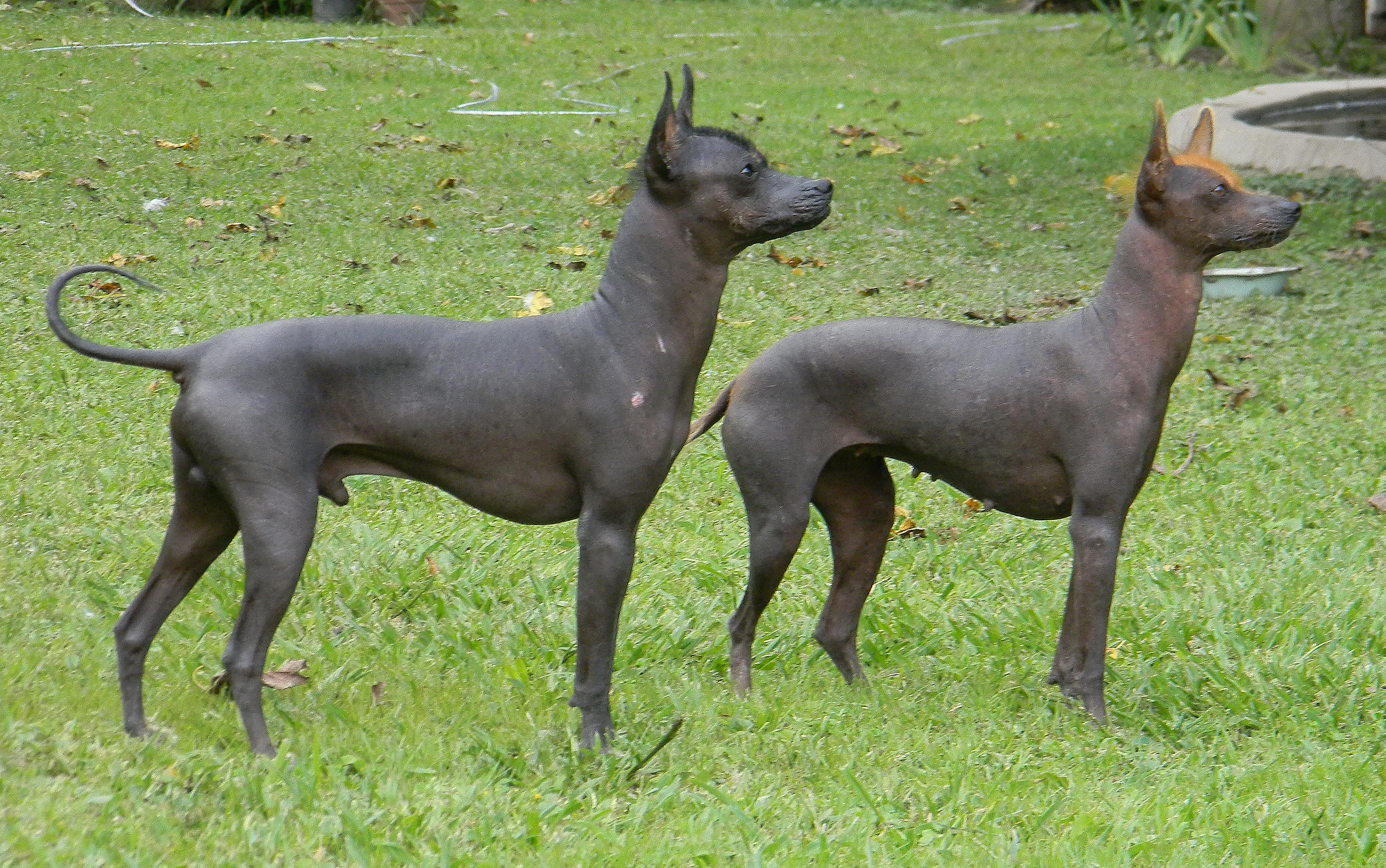
- Other names: Perro Pila Argentino
- Origin: Argentina
Traits
- Height: Small type: under 35 cm; Medium type: 35–45 cm
- Coat: hairless; also long-haired, short-haired and wire-haired
- Colour: any
Kennel club standards
- Asociación Canina Argentina: standard

The Argentine Pila or Perro Pila Argentino is an Argentine breed of hairless dog. It was recognised by the Asociación Canina Argentina in 2007. It forms part of the large group of South American hairless breeds and types, but is distinct from other modern breeds such as the Chinese Crested, the Peruvian Hairless and the Xoloitzcuintle. It is generally dark-skinned, or light-skinned with dark spots. Hairlessness in this breed along with other South American breeds is caused by a dominant mutation in the FOXI3 gene, which results in a loss of hair as the mutation affects ectodermal development. As the FOXI3 gene not only has an influence on hair follicles but the formation of teeth as well; the same mutation also causes dental differences.

It is estimated that approximately 1,700 of these dogs are in Argentina, predominantly in the Salta province in the north of the country.
