= Rez dog =

Dog living on Indigenous territory in the United States and Canada

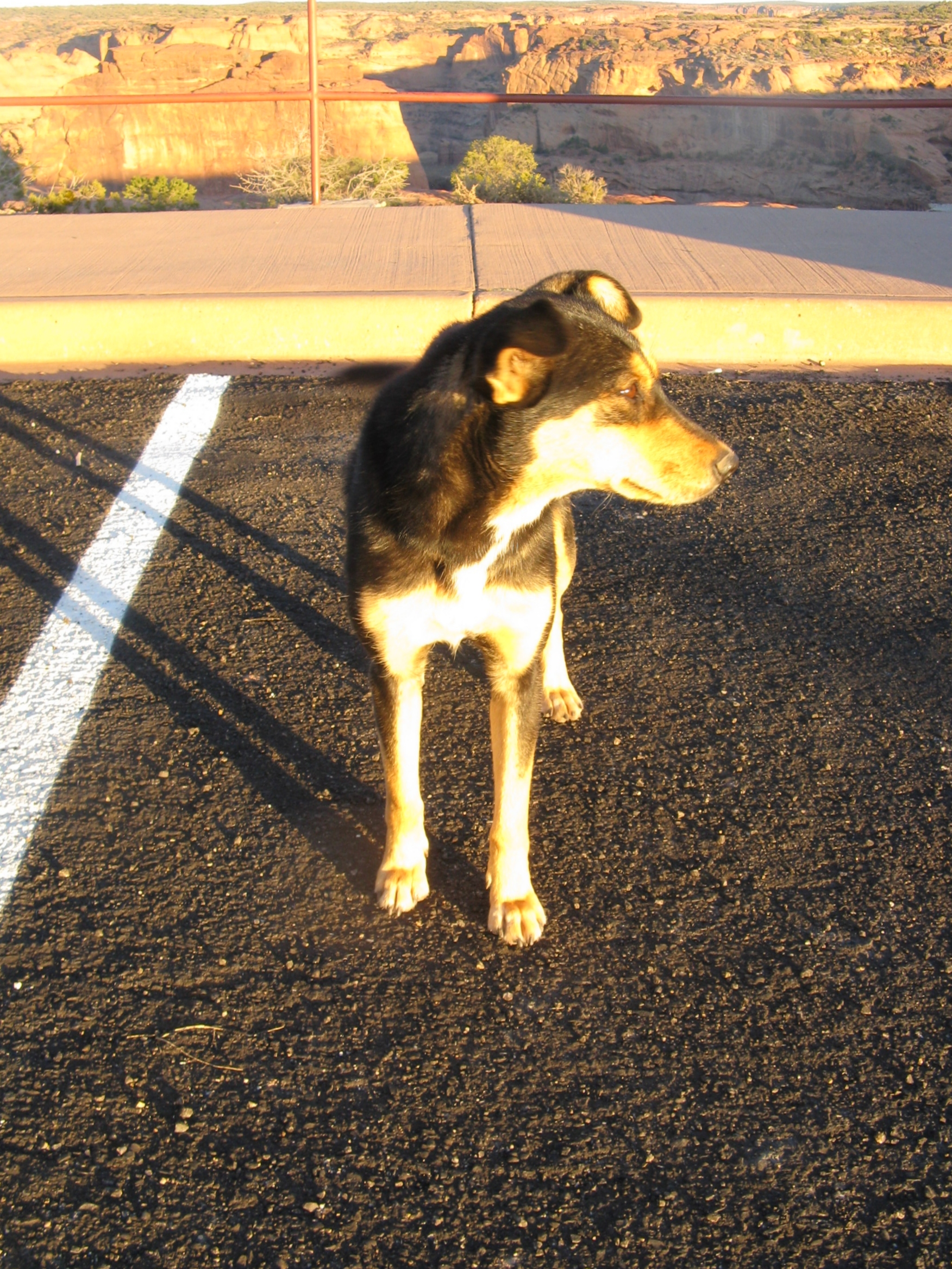
- A rez dog at Canyon de Chelly
- Other name: Rez
- Species: Dog

Rez dog (short for reservation dog) is usually a term for outdoor, stray, and feral dogs living on Native reservations in the United States and Indian reserves in Canada. The term has taken on many connotations, and has to some extent become an emblem of and metaphor for reservations/reserves, life on them, and indigenous North Americans in general. For example, a "rez dog" may refer to a resident of indigenous lands.

The distinction between a rez dog and dogs in general is often seen as emblematic of the difference between indigenous and majority culture ways of life. Untended dogs roaming indigenous lands cause problems that the communities must deal with. The dogs are generally thought of as mixed-breed and unsupervised.

== In commerce and literature ==
A clothing company, "Rez Dog Clothing", has adopted the persona of reservation dogs.

The narrator of two chapters of Antelope Woman, by novelist Louise Erdrich, is described as being part Ojibwe reservation dog, part Lakota dog, and part coyote.

== See also ==
- Carolina Dog
- Native American dogs
- Pariah dog
- Mixed-breed dog
