= American Hairless Terrier =

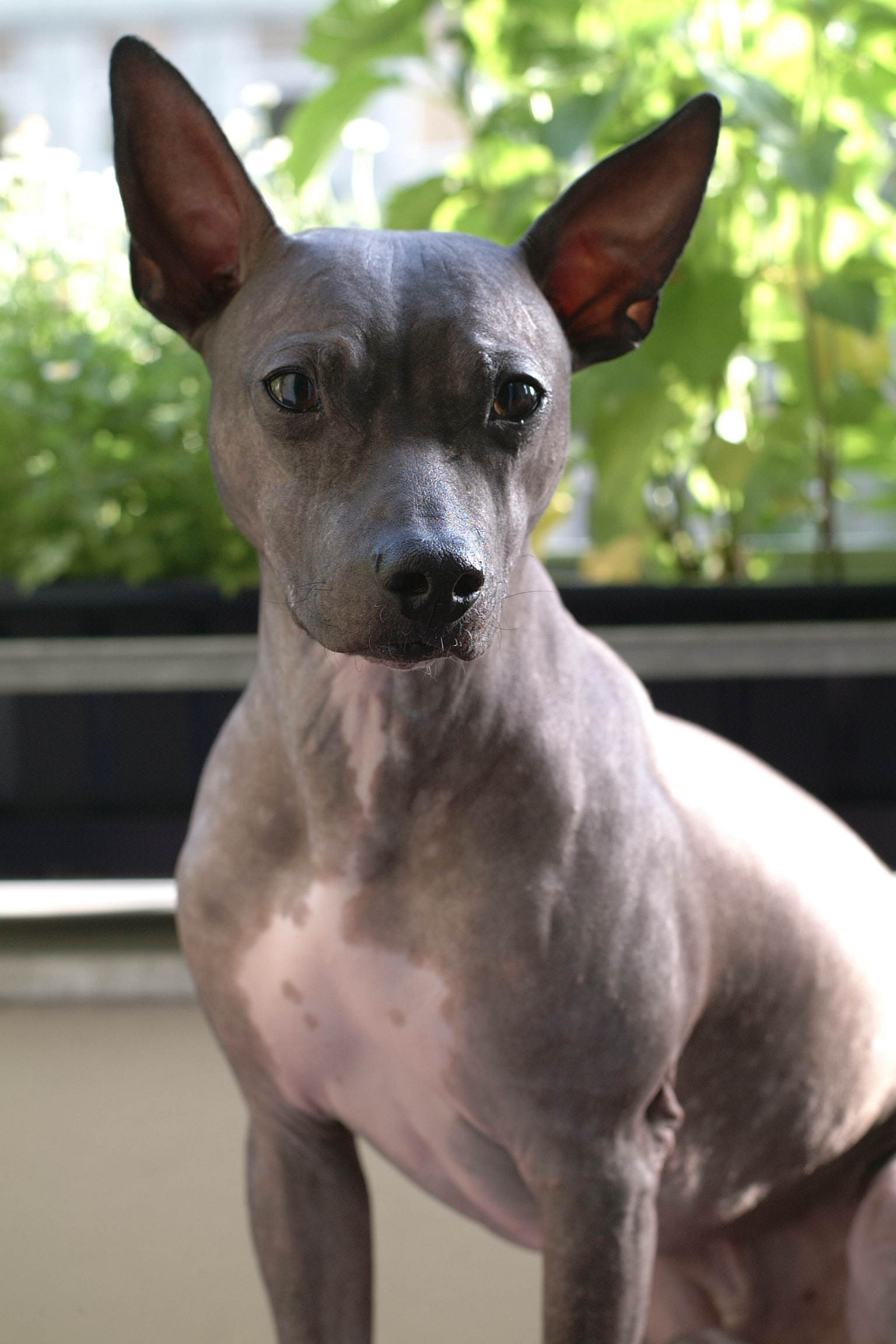
- Origin: United States
- Foundation stock: Rat Terrier
Traits
- Height: 10–18 in (25–46 cm)
- Weight: 7–14 lb (3.2–6.4 kg)
- Coat: Hairless, coated examples have a short dense coat
- Color: Variety of colors and patterns with white
Kennel club standards
- United Kennel Club: standard

The American Hairless Terrier is a breed of companion dog from the United States that was developed from naturally hairless Rat Terriers.

== History ==
In 1972, a completely hairless bitch pup was whelped in a litter of purebred Rat Terriers and adopted by Willie and Edwin Scott of Louisiana. Named Josephine, the bitch conformed to the Rat Terrier type in every way except for her coat, so the Scotts bred her. Her first litter produced another hairless bitch pup, Gypsy. Neither bitch whelped another hairless pup in multiple litters until, in 1981 at the age of nine, Josephine produced two more hairless pups, a dog and a bitch. In 1983 the dog, Snoopy, was mated to his hairless sisters and many more hairless pups were whelped, establishing the foundation stock for the new breed. Originally registered as a hairless variety of Rat Terriers, eventually the Scotts adopted a different breed name for their unique line and established a separate breed club, the American Hairless Terrier Association. In 2004 the United Kennel Club recognised the line as a breed and in 2016 the American Kennel Club also recognised the breed.

== Description ==
According to the United Kennel Club's breed standard, American Hairless Terriers typically stand between 10 and 18 inches (25 and 46 cm); the breed typically weighs between 7 and 14 pounds (3.2 and 6.4 kg). The breed has pricked ears and can be born with either a naturally short tail or a long tail, which is never docked.

At birth American Hairless Terriers are born with a light fuzz of hair over their entire body which they gradually shed from the nose backwards until they are entirely naked, though they sometimes retain eyebrows and whiskers. This typically occurs by the age of six weeks. The breed standard states the skin can be any color, although they are usually part colored with freckles that enlarge with age. Because of their lack of hair, the breed is particularly susceptible to hypothermia in cold weather and sunburn in sunny conditions.

Some American Hairless Terriers are born with coats; they are still recognised as examples of the breed. The breed standard states coated examples of the breed have a short and dense coat that can be solid white or bi-color, tri-color, sable and brindle, always with some white.

== See also ==
- List of dog breeds
- Feist
