= Xoloitzcuintle =

Hairless dog breed from Mexico

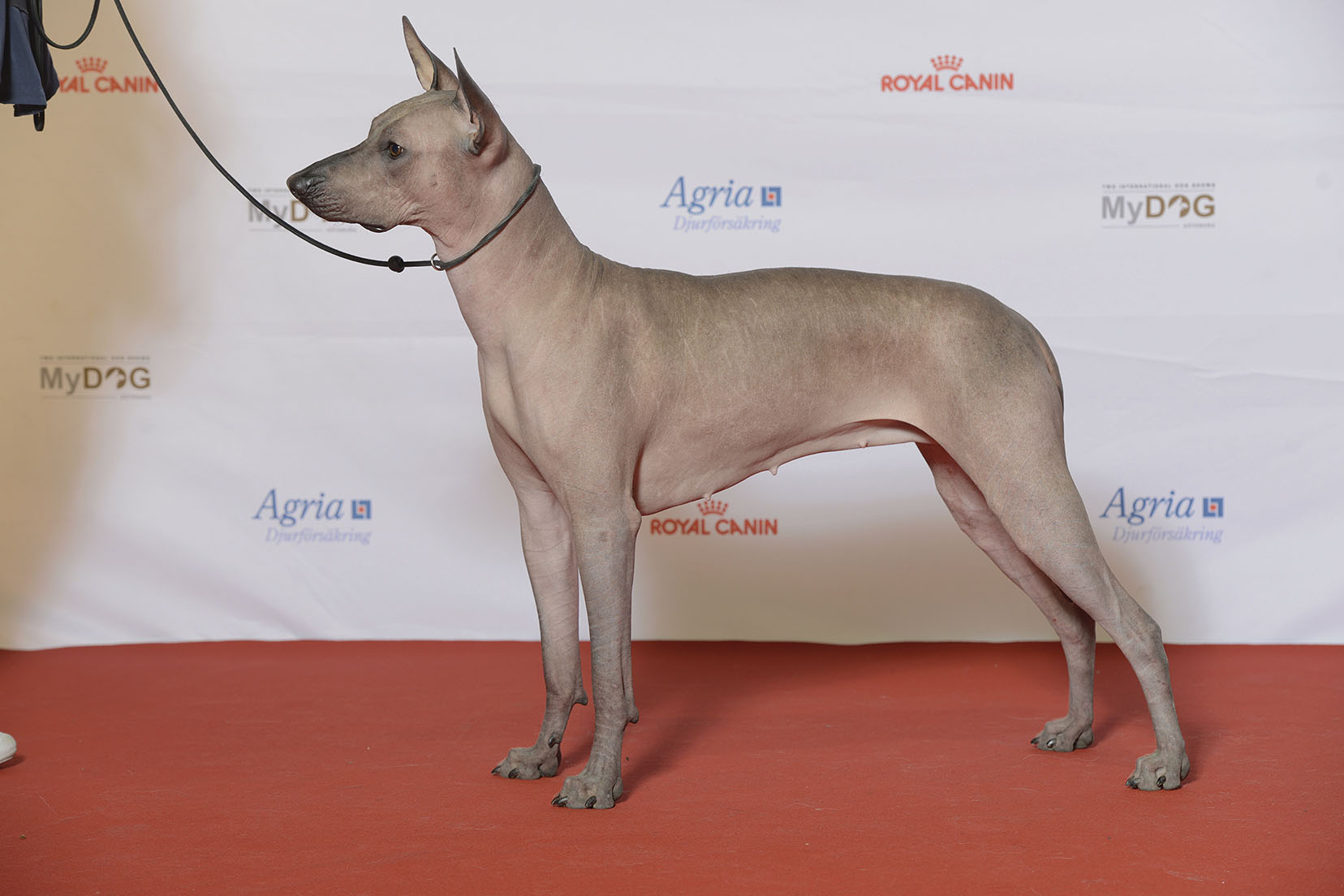
- A lighter-colored Xoloitzcuintle
- Other names: Xoloitzcuintle, Xoloitzquintle, Xoloitzcuintli
- Common nicknames: Xolo
- Origin: Mexico
Traits
- Coat: Coated and Hairless
Kennel club standards
- Fédération Cynologique Internationale: standard
- Notes: National dog of Mexico

The Xoloitzcuintle (or Xoloitzquintle, Xoloitzcuintli, or Xolo) is one of several breeds of hairless dog. It is found in standard, intermediate, and miniature sizes. The Xolo has both hairless and coated types, with the latter fully furred. Coated and hairless can be born in the same litter as a result of the same combination of genes. The hairless variant is known as the perro pelón mexicano or Mexican hairless dog. It is characterized by its wrinkles and dental abnormalities. In Nahuatl, from which its name originates, it is xōlōitzcuintli [ʃoːloːit͡sˈkʷint͡ɬi] (singular) and xōlōitzcuintin [ʃoːloːit͡sˈkʷintin] (plural). The name comes from the Aztec god of fire and lightning Xolotl that, according to ancient narratives, is its creator and itzcuīntli [it͡sˈkʷiːnt͡ɬi], meaning 'dog' in the Nahuatl language.

== History ==
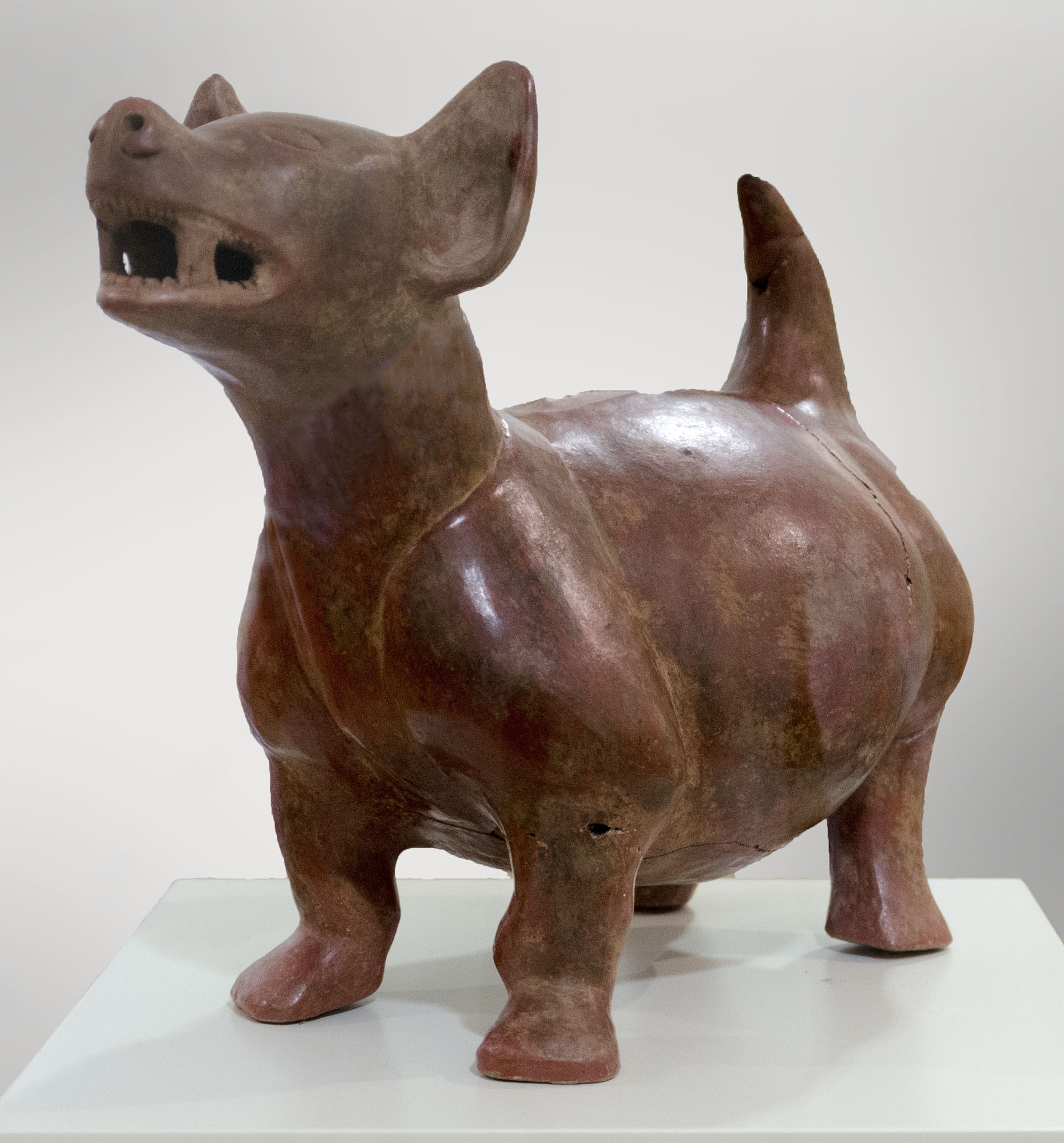
Colima dog

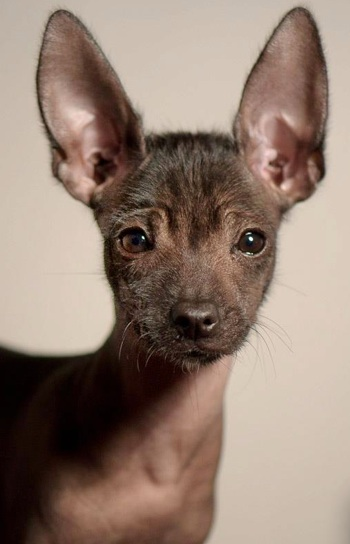
A Toy Xoloitzcuintle

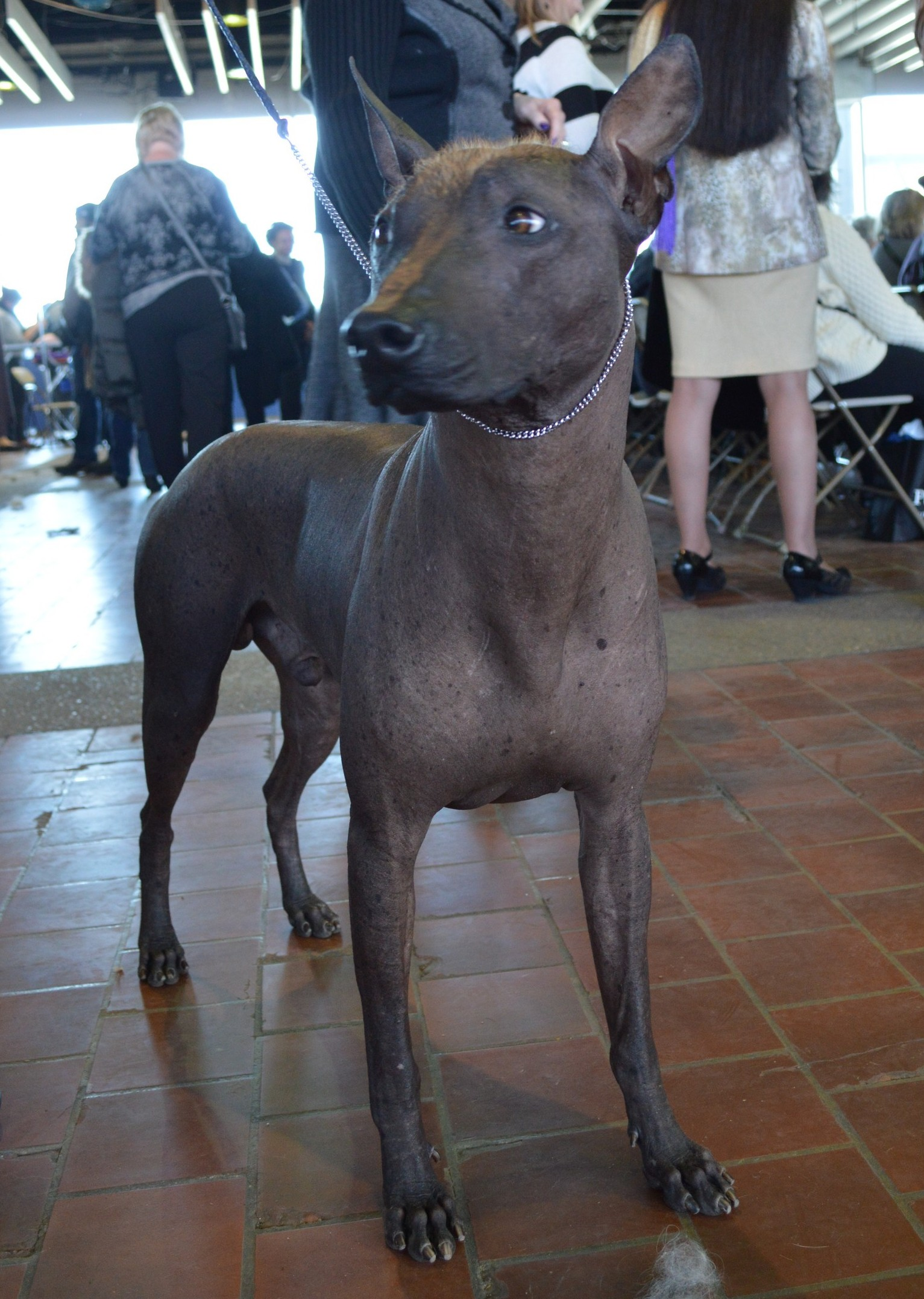
Giorgio Armani, the first Xoloitzcuintle to be named best of its breed at the Westminster Dog Show. He has achieved four Bests in Show and 27 Group Firsts since joining the American Kennel Club's Non-Sporting Group in January 2011.

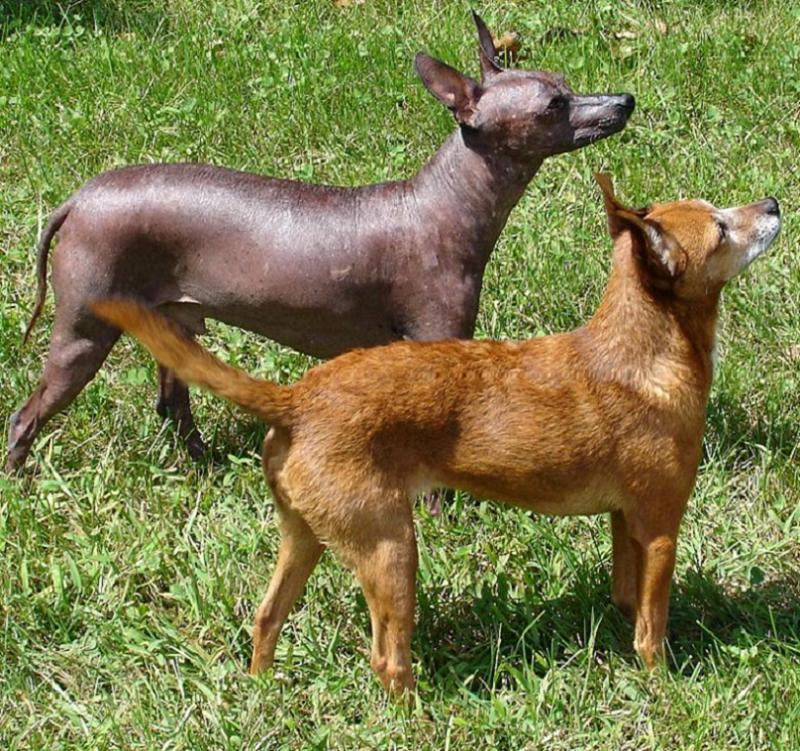
Hairless and coated Xoloitzquintin

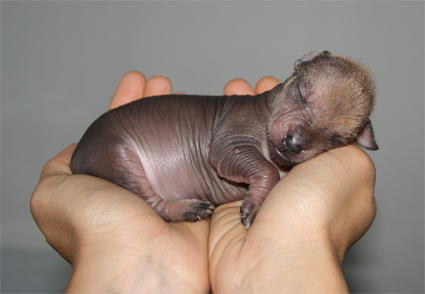
A newborn Xoloitzcuintle

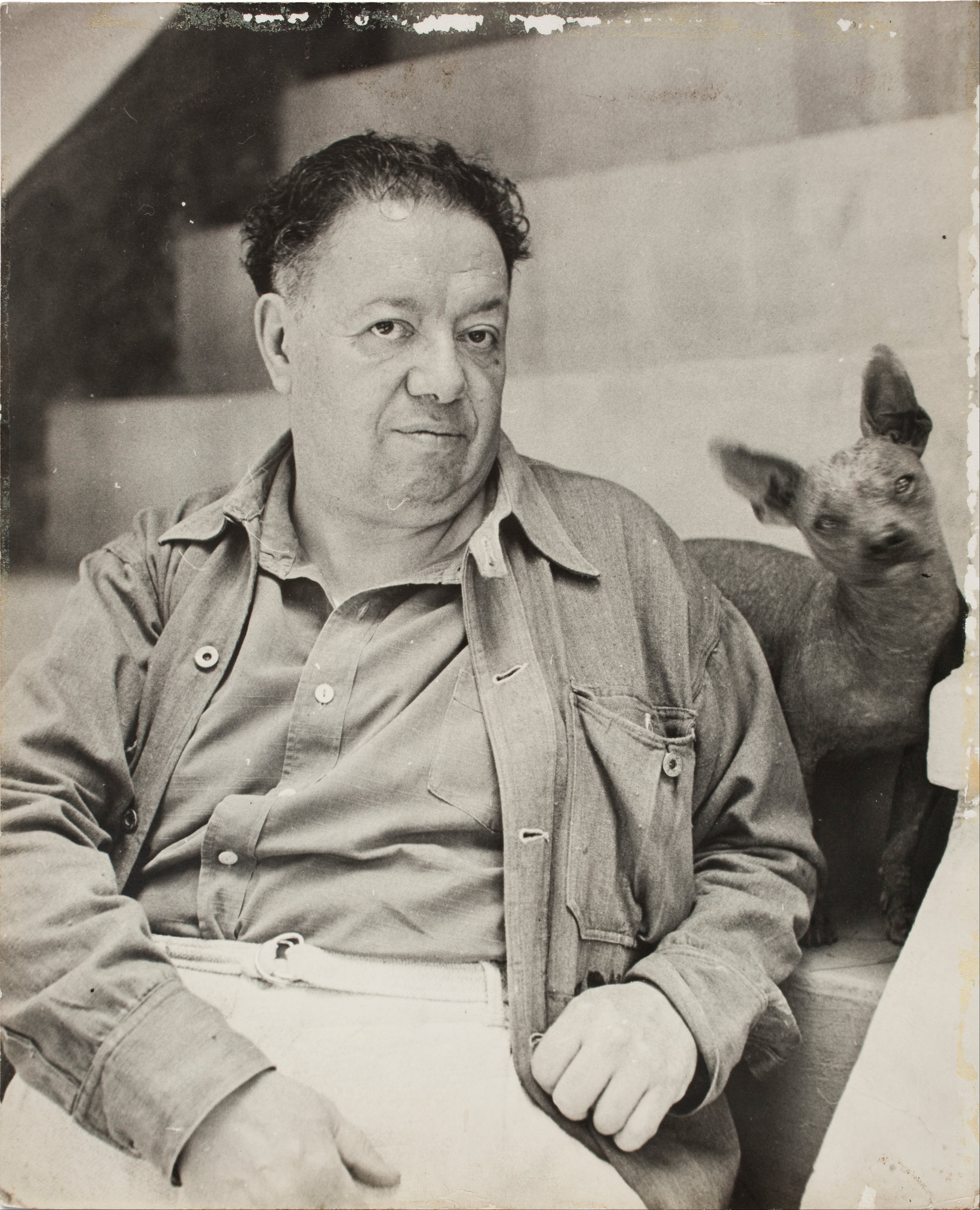
Artist Diego Rivera with a Xoloitzcuintle at the Casa Azul

Ceramic sculptures of a hairless breed of dog have been found in burial sites in ancient West Mexico. In ancient times, dogs that looked like present-day Xolos were often sacrificed and then buried with their owners to act as guides to the soul on its journey to the underworld. They have been found in burial sites of both the Maya and the Toltec.

Sixteenth-century Spanish accounts tell of large numbers of dogs being served at banquets. Aztec merchant feasts could have 80–100 turkeys and 20–40 dogs served as food. When these two meats were served in the same dish, the dog meat was at the bottom of the dish, possibly because it was held in lower regard.

The Aztecs consumed few domesticated animals, with over 90% of the bones found at archeological sites being deer.

=== Genetics ===
A 1999 genetic study using mitochondrial DNA found that the DNA sequences of the Xoloitzcuintle were identical to those of dogs from the Old World. In 2018, an analysis of DNA from archaeological remains of pre-Columbian dogs supported the view that pre-Columbian dogs in North America were not descendants of wolves that were domesticated in the New World, but rather that they were descendants of domesticated dogs that entered North America from Siberia along with human migrations more than 9,000 years ago. In 2020, sequencing of the ancient dog genome indicated that the two modern Mexican breeds, the Chihuahua and Xoloitzcuintli, derive only 4% and 3% of their ancestry from pre-colonial dogs.

Their phenotype is a consequence of canine ectodermal dysplasia caused by a mutation on the FOXI3 autosomal gene.

== Registry ==
=== Fédération Cynologique Internationale (FCI) ===
The breed did not receive any official notice in its homeland until the 1950s. The FCI, founded in 1940, was not prepared to declare the Xolo an official purebred at that time. According to breed historian Norman Pelham Wright, author of The Enigma of the Xoloitzcuintli, Xolos began to turn up at Mexican dog shows in the late 1940s. Although they were recognized as indigenous specimens of a native breed, interest in them was minimal at that time, because information was scarce and no standard existed by which to judge them. Within a decade, the FCI realized that the breed would become extinct if drastic action were not taken to save it. This led to the widely publicized Xolo Expedition of 1954. With the official sanction of the FCI, Wright and a team of Mexican and British dog authorities set off to discover if any purebred Xolos still existed in remote areas of Mexico. Eventually 10 structurally strong Xolos were found and these dogs formed the foundation of Mexico's program to revive the breed. A committee headed by Wright authored the first official standard for the breed; on May 1, 1956, the Xolo was finally recognized in its native land and, as Mexico is a member of the FCI, worldwide.

=== American Kennel Club (AKC) ===
Xolos were among the first breeds recorded by the American Kennel Club (AKC). A Mexican dog named "Mee Too" made breed history as the first AKC-registered Xolo in 1887. "Chinito Junior", bred and owned by Valetska Radtke of New York City, became the breed's only AKC champion to date. He earned his title on October 19, 1940.

In 1959, the Xolo was dropped from the AKC stud book due to the breed's scarcity and perceived extinction. The Xoloitzcuintli Club of America (XCA), the official parent club for the breed, was founded on October 26, 1986, to regain AKC recognition for the breed. On May 13, 2008, AKC voted to readmit the breed to its Miscellaneous Class starting January 1, 2009. The founding members voted unanimously to recognize all three sizes (toy, miniature and standard) and both varieties (hairless and coated) at their initial meeting. Since then, the XCA has compiled a stud book modeled on requirements for eventual AKC acceptance, held an annual independent specialty show, published a quarterly newsletter, The Xolo News, and maintained an active national rescue network, National Xolo Rescue (known before 2009 as The Xolo Rescue League). Since January 1, 2007, FSS registered Xolos have been eligible to compete in AKC performance events. The breed was moved into the AKC Studbook in December 2010 and has been eligible to be shown in the AKC Non-Sporting group since January 1, 2011.

== Characteristics ==
=== Appearance ===
The breed ranges in size from about 10 to 55 lb (5 to 23 kg). The height is 9 to 26 inches (23–67 cm). Similar in appearance to a Pharaoh Hound, with a sleek body, almond-shaped eyes, large bat-like ears, and a long neck, the Xolo is notable for its dominant trait of hairlessness. The dominant hairless trait originated in this breed as a spontaneous mutation thousands of years ago. The recessive expression of the trait will produce a coated variety, which is genetically inseparable from the hairless, as the homozygous appearance of the hairless mutation is fatal to the unborn pup. Most litters contain both hairless and coated puppies. The coated variety, covered with a short, flat dense coat represents the original form of the dog, prior to the occurrence of the spontaneous hairless mutation. The hairless variety is completely hairless on the body, with many dogs exhibiting a few short hairs on the top of the head, the toes, and the tip of the tail. Most hairless dogs are black or bluish-gray in color. The allele responsible for the Xolo's hairlessness also affects the dog's dentition: Hairless Xolos typically have an incomplete set of teeth while the dogs of the coated variety have complete dentition.

The Xolo is moderate in all aspects of its appearance, conveying an impression of strength, agility, and elegance. Xolo body proportions are rectangular, slightly longer in total body length than the height measured at the highest point of the withers (top of the shoulders). The breed occurs naturally in two varieties, hairless and coated. Hairless Xolos result from the presence of the dominant allele (HH or Hh) at the FOXI3 locus. Coated Xolo are the recessive expression, occurring only when two coated alleles (hh) are present. Breeding coated to coated will only produce coated pups because only the coated allele is present to be passed on.

Both varieties occur in all hair or skin colors, and the skin is often marked, splashed, or spotted. The most common colors are various shades termed black, grey, bronze, yellowish-blonde, blue and red. The breed occurs in a range of sizes, which breeders have standardized into three designations: Standard, Miniature and Toy.

The Xoloitzcuintle has a calm and attentive temperament.

=== Health ===
Originating in tropical regions, the breed is unsuited to living outdoors in colder temperate climates, and is best regarded as an indoor dog. Regular bathing, light grooming, and basic skin care are necessary, as neglect can lead to acne or other skin problems. Most dermatological issues arise from poor breeding, neglect, or excessive bathing and moisturising, which strip the skin’s natural protective oils and clog pores.

== In contemporary culture ==
Xoloitzcuintles are represented in popular culture and are popular pets. Museo El Carmen in Mexico City exhibited a show titled Xolos, compañeros de viaje (Xolos, travel companions) in 2019–20 of more than 100 artifacts – ceramics, remains, and artworks – overviewing the importance of the Xoloitzcuintle in Mexican heritage. A Xolo named Dante stars in the US blockbuster CGI animation 2017 Disney/Pixar film Coco. On August 12, 2016, the Mayor of Mexico City Miguel Ángel Mancera designated the Xoloitzcuintle a "cultural heritage and symbol" of Mexico City. The Dolores Olmedo Museum keeps a pack of Xolos on their grounds.

The Xoloitzcuintle is the symbol and mascot of Club Tijuana, the Xoloitzcuintles de Caliente, a professional soccer club founded in 2007. Xolos are depicted in some of Mexican artist Frida Kahlo's paintings, one of which is commemorated on the 2007 500-peso note, featuring Frida Kahlo's painting titled The Love Embrace of the Universe, the Earth (Mexico), Myself, Diego, and Señor Xolotl (1949) on the reverse of the note. Diego Rivera's large murals, The History of Mexico, in the Palacio Nacional in Mexico City feature numerous Xolos.

== See also ==
- Chinese Crested Dog
- List of dog breeds
- Hairless dog
- Peruvian Inca Orchid
