= Peruvian Hairless Dog =

Peruvian breed of dog

Peruvian Inca Orchid
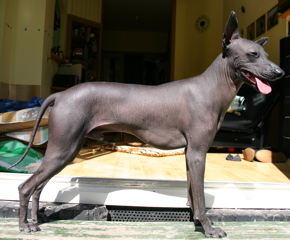
- Other names: Perro Sin Pelo de Perú; Peruvian viringo Inca Hairless Dog; Peruvian Hairless Dog; Peruvian Inca Orchid
- Origin: Peru
Kennel club standards
- Fédération Cynologique Internationale: standard

The Peruvian Hairless Dog or Perro Sin Pelo del Perú is a Peruvian breed of hairless dog. It is the only living breed of dog indigenous to Peru.

As in other hairless breeds, coated examples can also occur. In hairless examples the skin may be any one of a wide variety of colors, with or without limited unpigmented areas, usually the legs, tail or chest; any hairs may be of any colour. In coated dogs, the coat may be of any colour but merle.

Hairless dogs are associated with the Andean civilizations. The modern breed is recognized as a part of the national cultural heritage.

== Naming ==
The dog has been known by many names, among them Allqu (in Inca times), Quechua: Kaclla, Spanish: Perro calato, Perro chino (which may derive from china, 'woman', rather than indicating a Chinese origin), Perro de Sechura, Perro Chimú, Perro orquídea, Viringo and Vitilingo.

== History ==
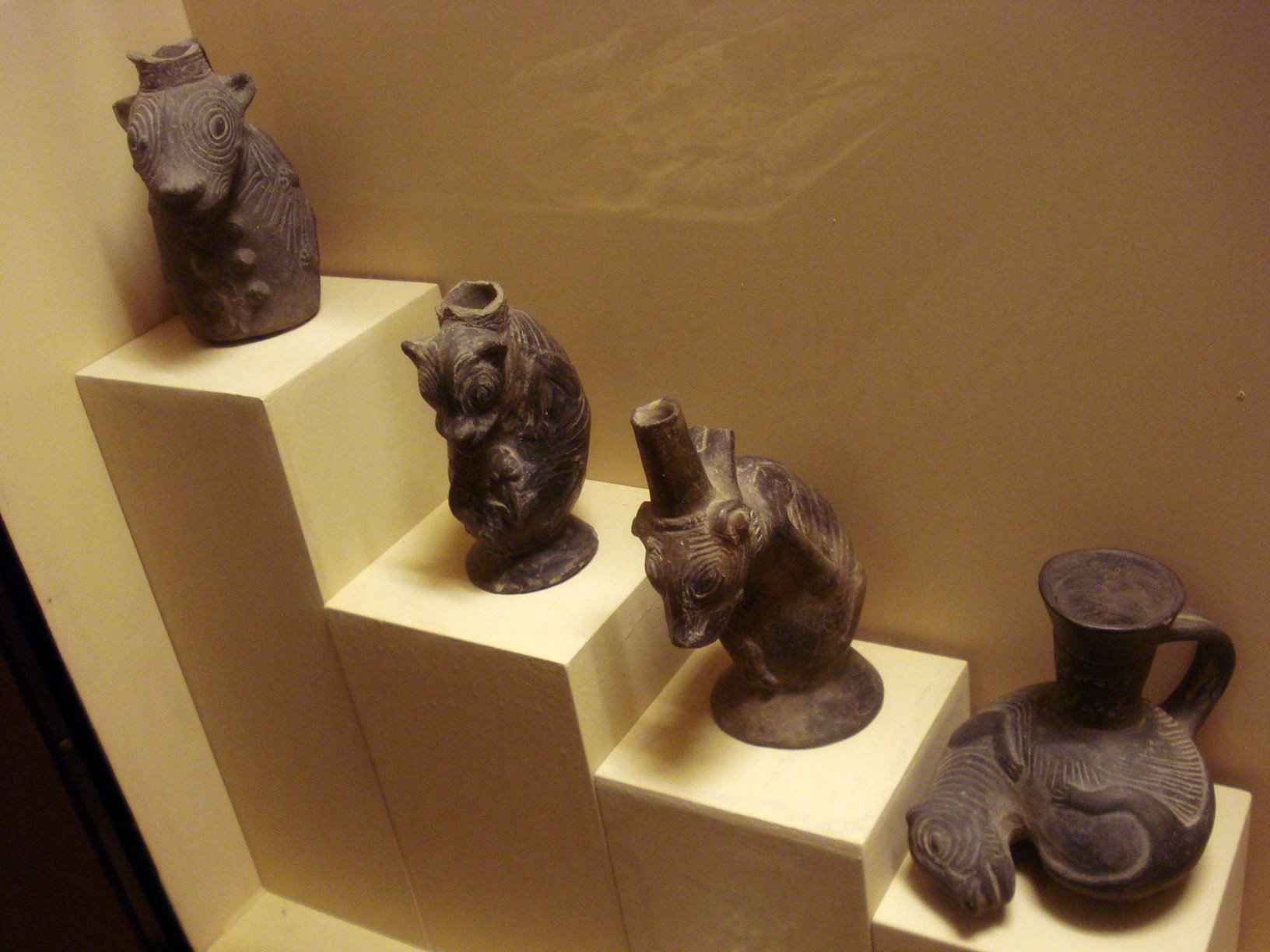
Huacos of ancient Peruvian Hairless Dogs, Brüning Museum.

The Peruvian Hairless Dog is often perceived to be an Incan dog because it is known to have been kept during the Inca Empire (the Spaniards classified them as one of the six different breeds of dogs in the empire), and they were also kept as pets in pre-Inca cultures from the Peruvian northern coastal zone. Ceramic hairless dogs from the Chimú, Moche, and Vicus culture are well known. Depictions of Peruvian hairless dogs appear around A.D. 750 on Moche ceramic vessels and continue in later Andean ceramic traditions.

Peruvian Hairless Dogs are now a symbol of Peru and part of its national heritage, celebrated in art and literature. The Fédération Cynologique Internationale (FCI) accepted the breed and adopted an official breed standard.

Before that time, in the United States, some enthusiasts created another type of Peruvian hairless dog, the Peruvian Inca Orchid. The Peruvian Inca Orchid is recognized by the AKC and all recognized dogs are descendants of 13 dogs brought from Peru in the early 20th century.

== Characteristics ==
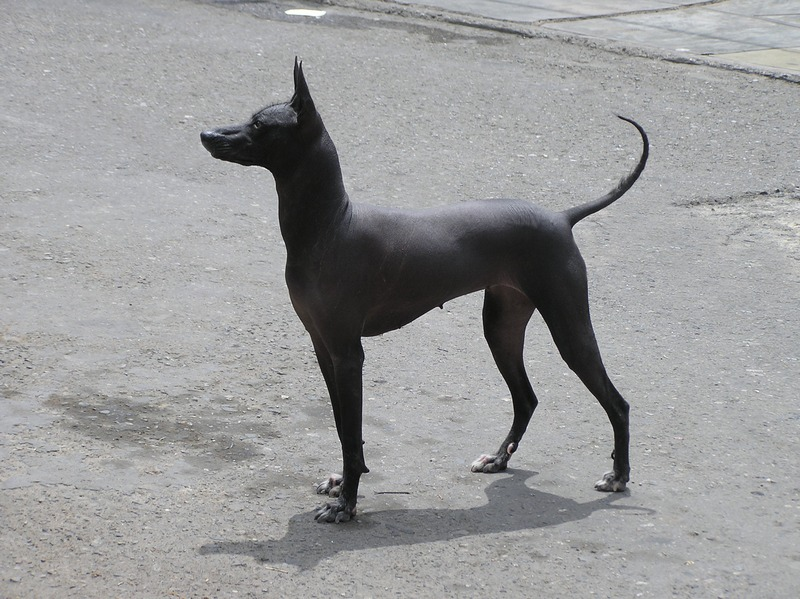
A perfect Peruvian Hairless Dog pedigree. Trujillo, Peru.

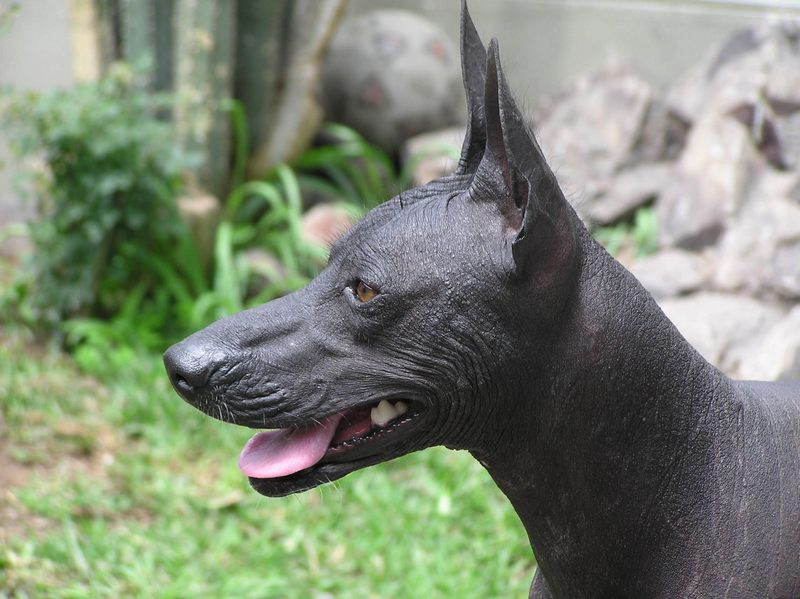
Face of a typical Peruvian Hairless Dog.

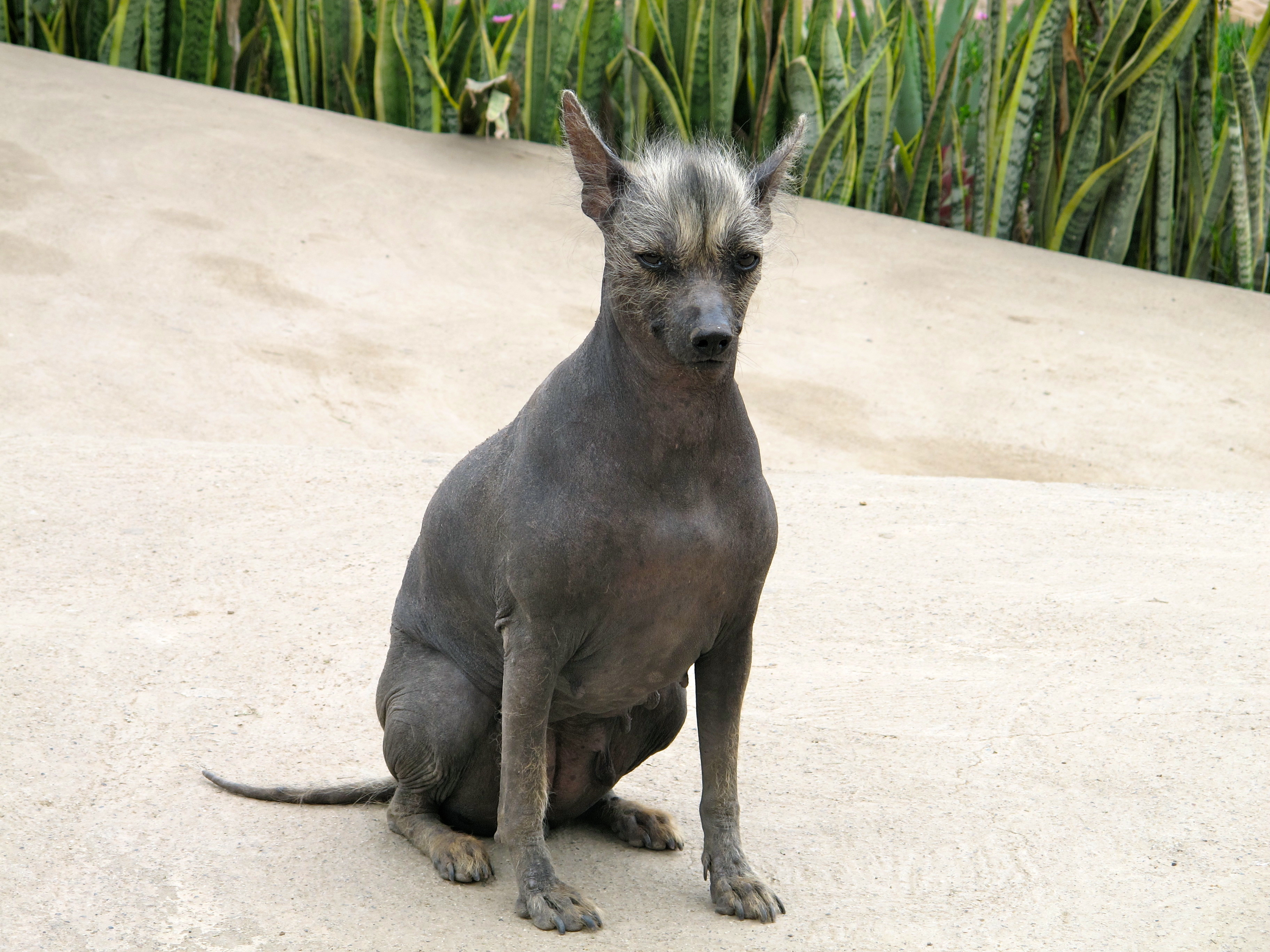
Female Peruvian Hairless Dog sitting.

According to the FCI breed standard, the most important aspect of its appearance is its hairlessness. Hairless dogs are often used in research for testing of various conditions such as dermatitis and other immune-related conditions. The dog may have short hair on top of its head, on its feet, and on the tip of its tail. In Peru, breeders tend to prefer completely hairless dogs. The color of skin can be chocolate-brown, elephant-grey, copper, or mottled. They can be totally one color or one color with tongue pink spots. Albinism is not accepted. The eye color is linked to the skin color. It is always brown, but dogs with light colors can have clearer eyes than darker-skinned dogs.

Peruvian Hairless Dogs come in three sizes:

- Small 25–40 cm (10–15.5 in)
- Medium 40–50 cm (15.5–19.5 in)
- Large 50–65 cm (19.5–25.5 in)

Weight is also varied according to size :

- Small 4 – 8 kg (9 – 18 lbs)
- Medium 8 – 12 kg (18 – 26 lbs)
- Large 12 – 25 kg (26 – 55 lbs)

The dogs should be slim and elegant, with the impression of force and harmony, without being coarse. The ears should be candle-flame shaped and erect with the possibility to lay flat. Proportions of height (at withers) to length (withers to base of tail) are 1:1.

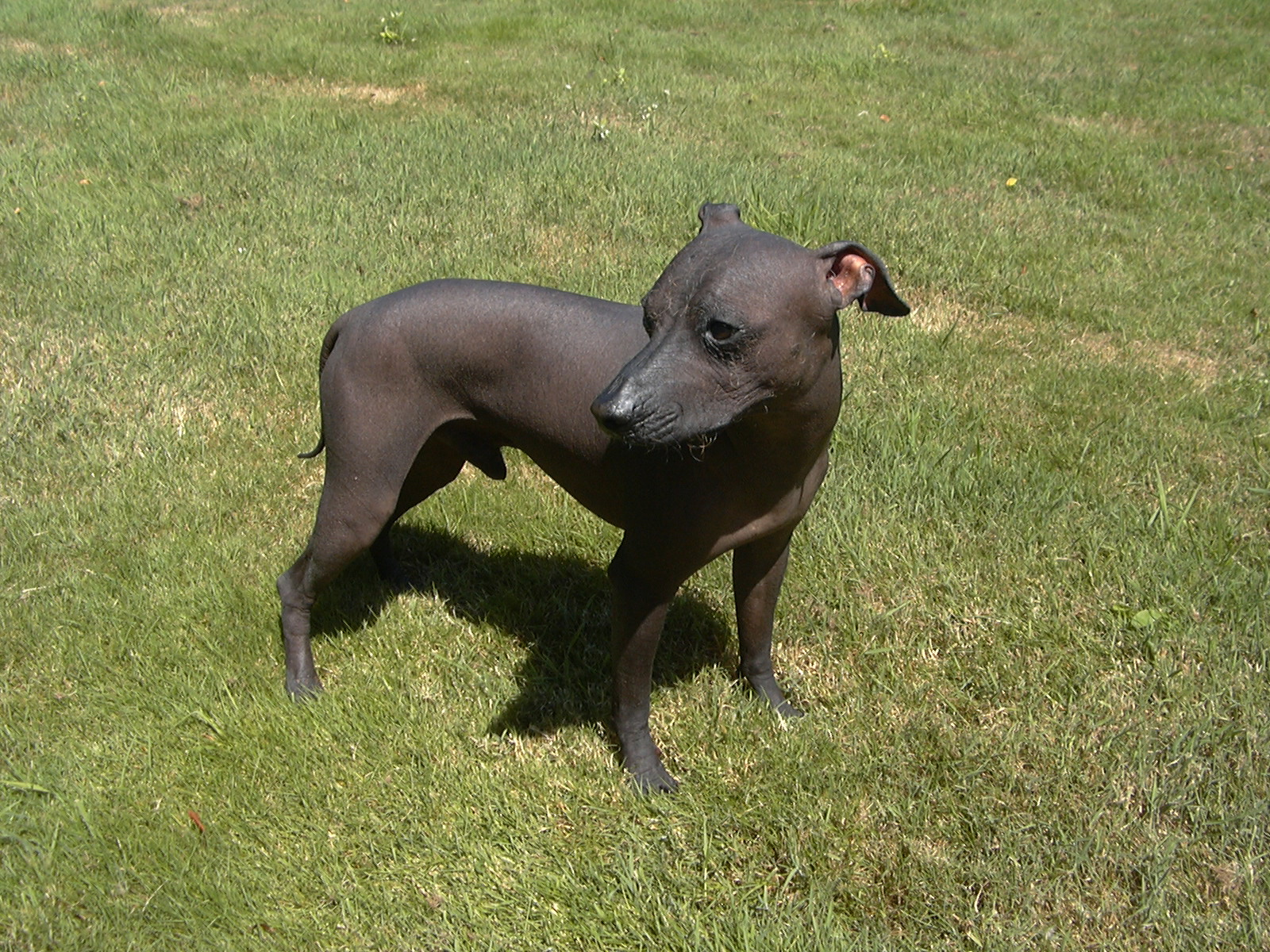
Peruvian Hairless Dog, US.

The gene that causes hairlessness also results in the dogs often having fewer teeth than other breeds, mostly lacking molars and premolars.

The hairlessness trait is an incompletely dominant lethal mutation, which means that hairlessness does not breed true. Embryos homozygous for the mutation do not develop in the womb. This results in an average birthrate of 2:1 of hairless to coated puppies.

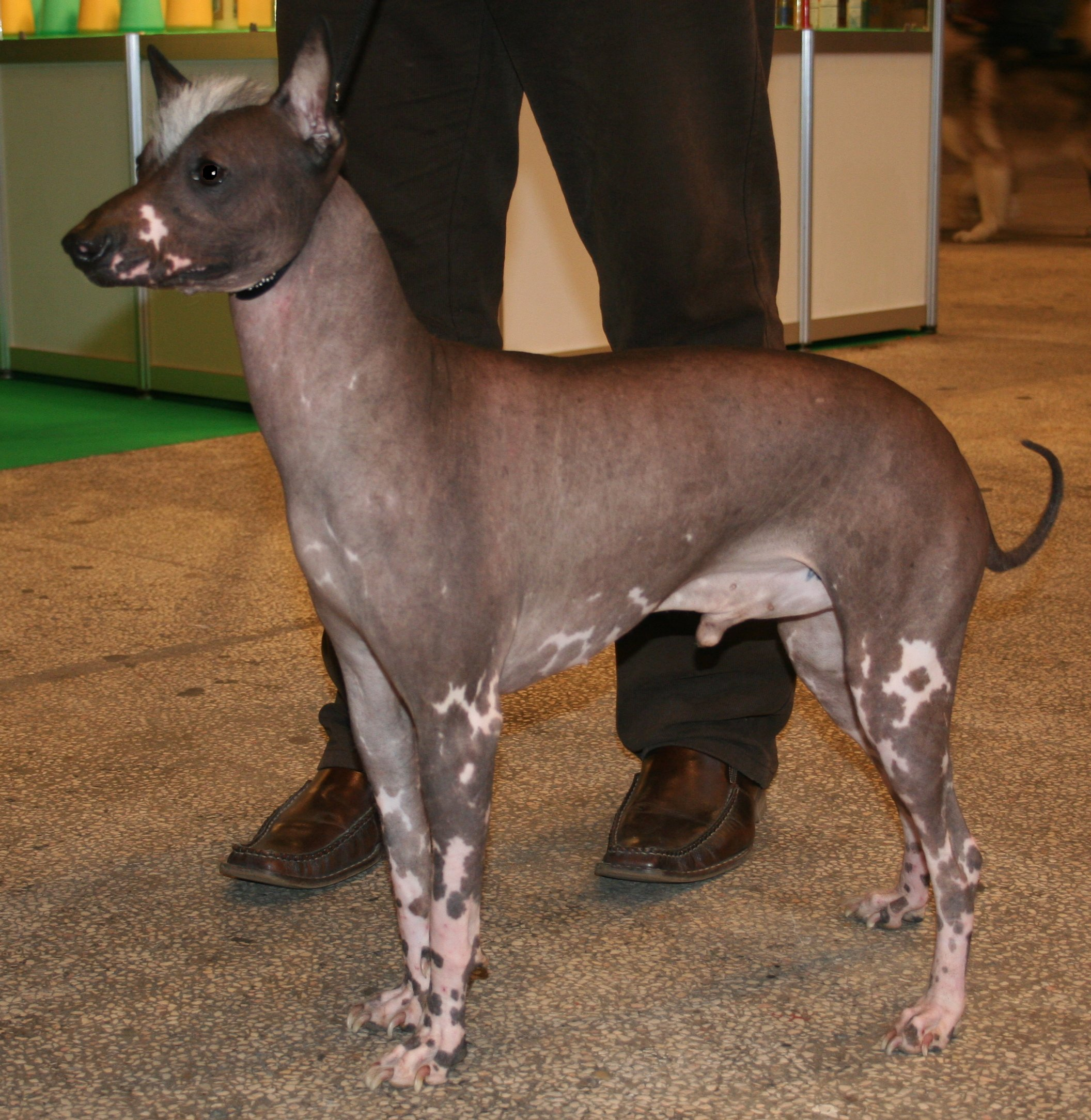
Posing.
