= Caramelo (dog) =

Mixed-breed dog with socio-environmental typology

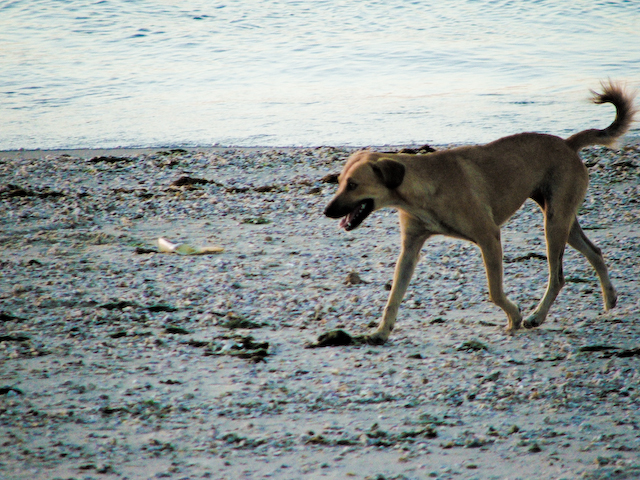
- Caramelo trotting at the beach
- Other names: Caramel mutt
- Common nicknames: vira-lata caramelo (Brazil); perrito amarillo (Mexico)
Traits
- Weight: 30–50 lb (14–23 kg)
- Colour: fawn; tawny; tan; (Phaeomelanic)

The caramelo (Portuguese: [kaɾaˈmɛlu]) is a mixed-breed, caramel‑colored dog type traditionally associated with a free-ranging lifestyle in Latin America. (Note: cachorro caramelo (in Portuguese), perro caramelo (in Spanish); or simply caramelo) In addition to the honey-colored coat, the designation "vira-lata caramelo" (Brazilian Portuguese for 'caramel trashcan-tipper') also refers to the fact that the lack of pedigree is a major feature of its notability. (Note: Other Latin American Countries: Often called perro amarillo (yellow dog) or simply mestizos (mixed breeds). Boca-preta Sertanejo)

Mutts have long been found on the streets of Latin American countries. As of 2026, Mexico's population of stray dogs has been estimated to be near 30 million. (Note: In this context, a 'stray' or 'free-ranging' dog refers to any dog who is not under the care of a specific person at the time being; 'vulnerable', while often used interchangeably in the sources, refers to dogs living on the streets and regularly being taken care of by members of a community or neighborhood as well as pets whose tutor or tutors live below the poverty threshold) In Brazil, the estimated population of stray dogs has increased one order of magnitude from 3.9 million in 2018 to 20 million in 2026. Of all the free-ranging dogs living in Brazil as of 2026, up to 90 percent are both visually and genetically identifiable within the namesake colors of the "caramelo" trait. Due to their high genetic diversity, caramelo dogs are notably less prone to be affected by inherited diseases.

Statistically significant persistence of some phenotypic traits—such as medium build, medium to long snout with black nose, short fur and, to a lesser degree, firm ears—has been consistently found in warm-colored mongrels of different regions. Other than their hallmark characteristics, caramelos may have intragroup differences in appearance, and the "caramelo" designation does not adhere to breed standards of animal fancy -purposed organizations.

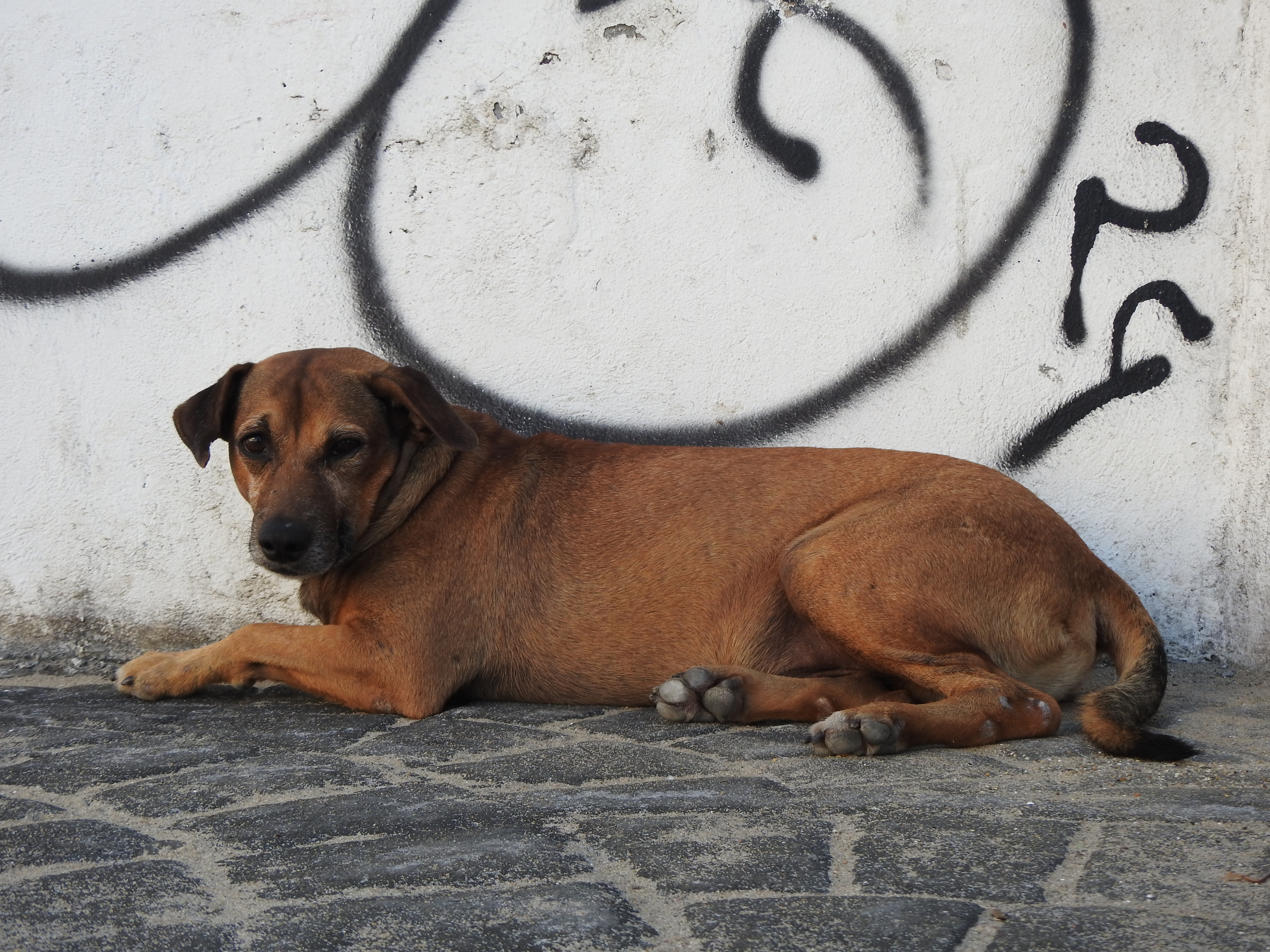
Tawny stray caramelo in Salvador, Bahia

Roughly half of caramelos who live on the streets are informally cared for by the community, while another major part are simply roaming off, scrounging for food by themselves. Despite general sympathy towards caramel mutts, rescued caramelos are often disfavored for adoption when compared with purebred dogs.

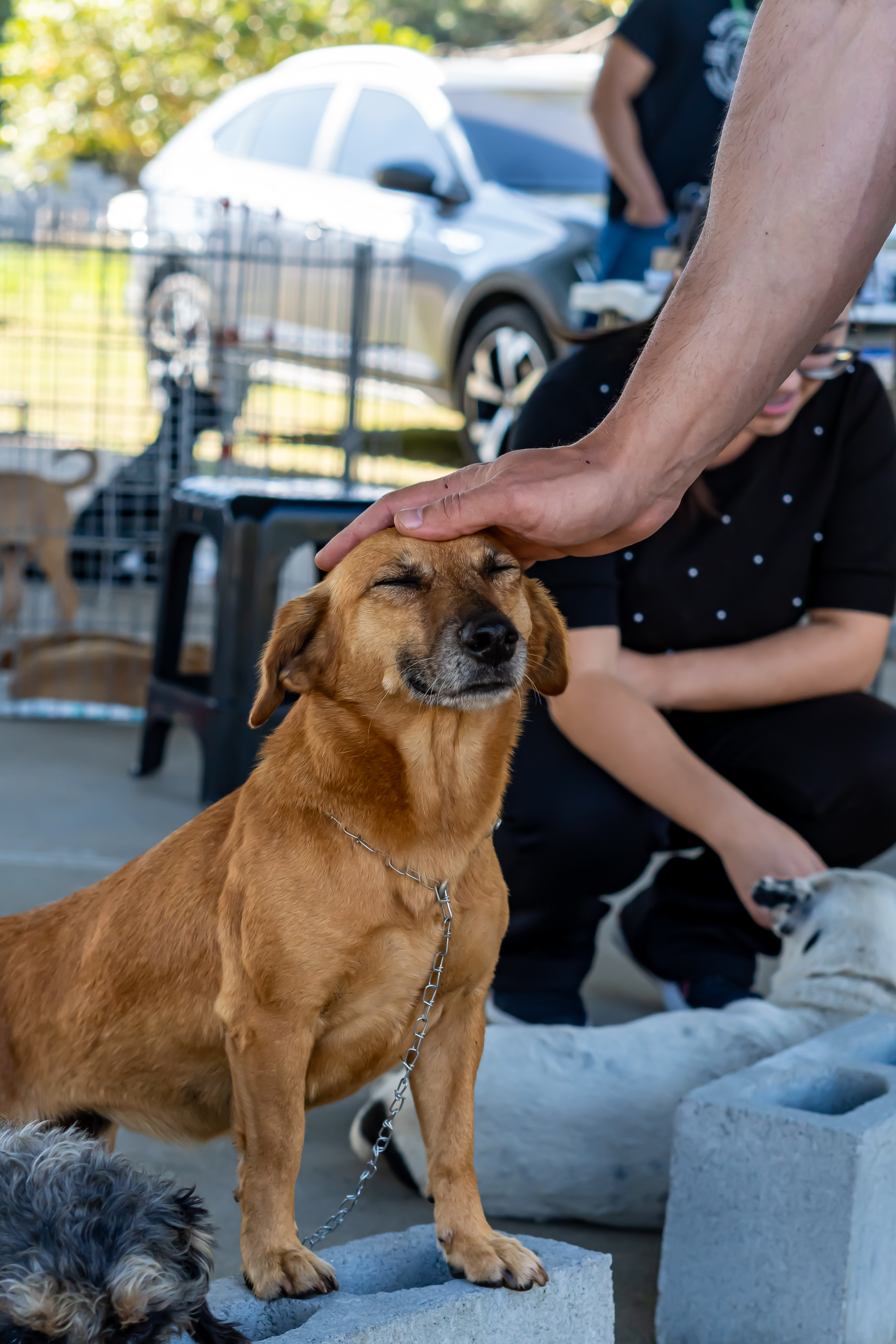
Shelter caramelo in a dog adoption event.

== Etymology ==
The English word comes from French caramel, borrowed from Spanish caramelo (18th century), itself possibly from Portuguese caramelo. Most likely that comes from Late Latin calamellus 'sugar cane', a diminutive of calamus 'reed, cane', itself from Greek κάλαμος. Less likely, it comes from Medieval Latin cannamella, from canna 'cane' + mella 'honey'. Finally, some dictionaries connect it to Arabic kora-moħalláh 'ball of sweet'.

== Origin ==
Genomic studies have shown that the caramelo is a mix of nearly 300 breeds from Europe, Asia and the Americas, which may explain the presence of caramel-colored mongrels (Note: or regional designations thereof) in warm-climate countries of different continents. The geographic distribution of caramelos is especially significant in Latin American countries such as Argentina, Bolivia, Brazil, Mexico and Peru. Despite popular belief that caramelos are originally from Brazil, dog acquisition by some Amazonian cultures began towards the end of the nineteenth century, and there is no evidence of an in-situ domestication initiated after that. In addition, genetic pairwise distance analysis indicates that early populations of dogs in the Americas were quickly assimilated by those introduced from the first wave of European colonization onwards.

Archaeological research has shown that medium-sized dogs with mesocephalic skulls existed in southeastern and southern regions of the Americas from at least the end of the third millennium BP to historical times. As phylogenetic analyses identify both pre-Columbian and modern dogs further into the subclades of haplogroup A, the degree of similarity of alleles can be quantified such as to better trace these dogs ancestry; knowledge on canine gene polymorphism tends to unfold as dogs from a wider geographic distribution are studied.

Studies on gene polymorphisms have been less common for South American dog populations than European and North and Central American lineages, the main knowledge gap being to establish local hybridizations and migratory routes of dogs. Since dogs have traveled with humans to every continent, and the evolution of Canis familiaris subspecies has been influenced by human history for thousands of years, archaeogenetics data have been used as proxies to quantify dogs' morphological diversity during early peopling of the Americas.

A 2015 assessment of archaeogenetics datasets indicated low levels of genetic diversity in pre-modern populations of dogs in the Americas when compared with dogs from other continents. It also identified new putative founding haplotypes, (Note: in addition to those that closely resemble mtDNA haplotypes of wolves, which is already expected from any given canis) which could be explained by ancient deliberate breeding practices In another study, DNA analyses of Alaskan Husky dogs and Brazilian mongrels identified a previously unknown allele which, together with alleles only seen before in gray wolves, uncovered a new haplotypic combination in Brazilian dogs.

== Typology ==
Mongrels' phaeomelanins
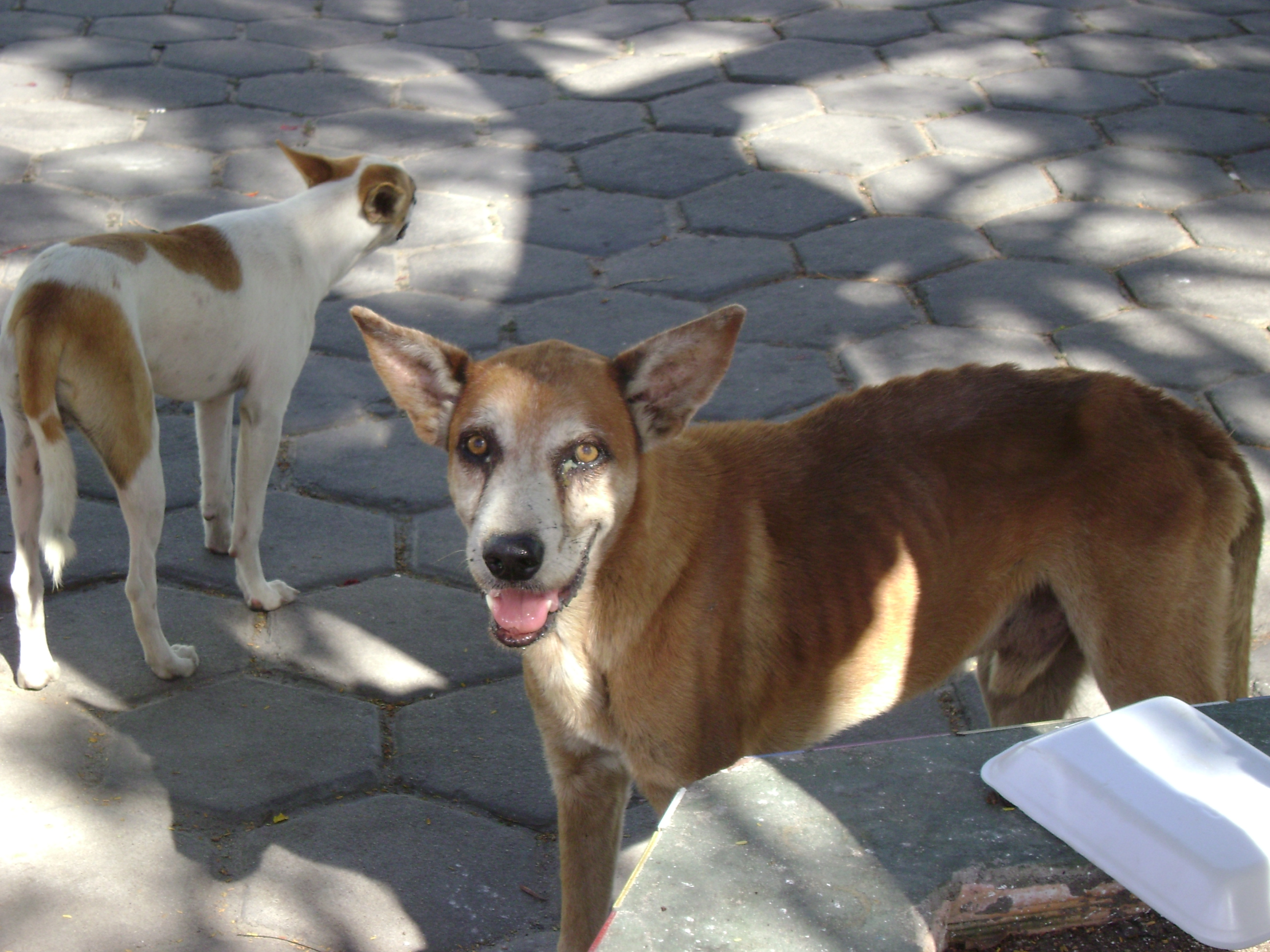
- Dogs in Alcobaça, Bahia, Brazil

Color coordinates
- Hex triplet: #CD9D67
- sRGB^{B} (r, g, b): (205, 157, 103)
- HSV (h, s, v): (32°, 50%, 80%)
- CIELCh_{uv} (L, C, h): (68, 55, 49°)
- Source: GWAS-based numerical taxonomy (Note: Mean phenotype for the mixed-breed cohort (see table)) (Note: All relevant data are available under CC0 1.0 at dryad.)
- B: Normalized to [0–255] (byte)
- Genotype–phenotype mapping of color patterns is nonetheless bound to overlapping or inconsistent naming systems.

Canine phaeomelanic scale
- 1
- 2
- 3
- 4
- 5
- 6

Though not recognized by kennel club standards, their honey-colored fur became characteristic enough to warrant the caramelos a distinction of their own should their socio-environmental and cultural significances be taken into account, most notably in Brazil, where the vira-lata caramelo is both popularly and formally considered a national symbol, often associated with Brazilian diversity pride and resilient adaptability.

Mammalian coat color is attributed to alleles that are notably pleiotropic to behavioural phenotypes. Upon domestication, certain traits were targeted by humans for being desirable and, for canids, tameness has been particularly favoured, which translated to behaviour-based artificial selection. Therefore, early domestication of dogs has directly induced mutations associated with color disparities, and the occurrence of yellowish offsprings is most likely as early as domestication itself, which explains their persistent phylogeography across all continents, including the late Siberian Zhokov island dog, the Australasian Dingo, the New Guinea Highland Dog and others.

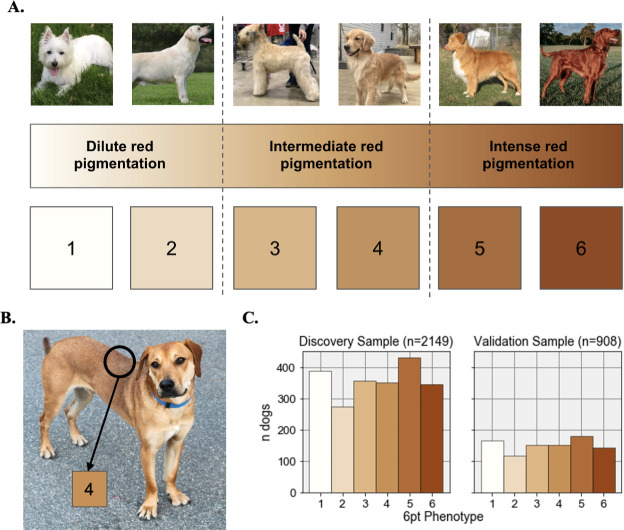
From a heuristically defined discrete scale, six equally distant colors were used to derive an operationable definition of pheomelanic pigmentation. (Note: The dog pictured in Fig B is "Duke" (owned by Adam Tracy). The source does not mention whether or not Duke is a mongrel.)

The semantic extension of the "caramelo" category is purposefully unquantifiable, their population structure is fuzzy by definition. Inasmuch as a color-based qualifier, a "caramelo" dog is a mongrel whose coat's dominant pigmentation are phaeomelanins. As for the tone, tint or shade, the chromaticity is a quantitative, continuously variable trait expressed by alleles of the ASIP gene that control the yellowness of the phaeomelanic pigment on hair follicles' melanocytes, ranging from whiter variants of the wild-type agouti to warmer (yellow–red gradient) intensities. (Note: In traditional color theory, the colors within the range between red and yellow are, by definition, shades of orange.)

== Culture ==
Video promoted by the Central Bank of Brazil starring a talking caramelo, introduces the then-soon-to-be issued R$200 banknote. (In Brazilian Portuguese)

Brazil was the first to acknowledge the cultural significance of and to consider the caramelo as a national icon. Brazilians take pride in relating to virtues traditionally associated with caramel mongrels, such as resilience in spite of marginalisation and survivorship in spite of hardness. Widespread use of the image of caramelos included carnival parades, a 2025 Netflix movie starring an actual caramelo dog, advertisement campaigns and internet memes.

In July 2020, Federal Deputy Fred Costa started an online petition to feature the caramelo dog on the soon-to-be issued R$200 banknotes. Although the Central Bank of Brazil had already decided to print the maned wolf on the notes, the bank agreed to promote caramelo dogs in response to calls for action against animal abuse. In September 2020, a caramelo dog starred the official announcement of the new 200 Brazilian reals bill.

In April 2023, Federal Deputy Felipe Becari introduced a bill to recognize the caramelo dog as an intangible cultural heritage in the country.

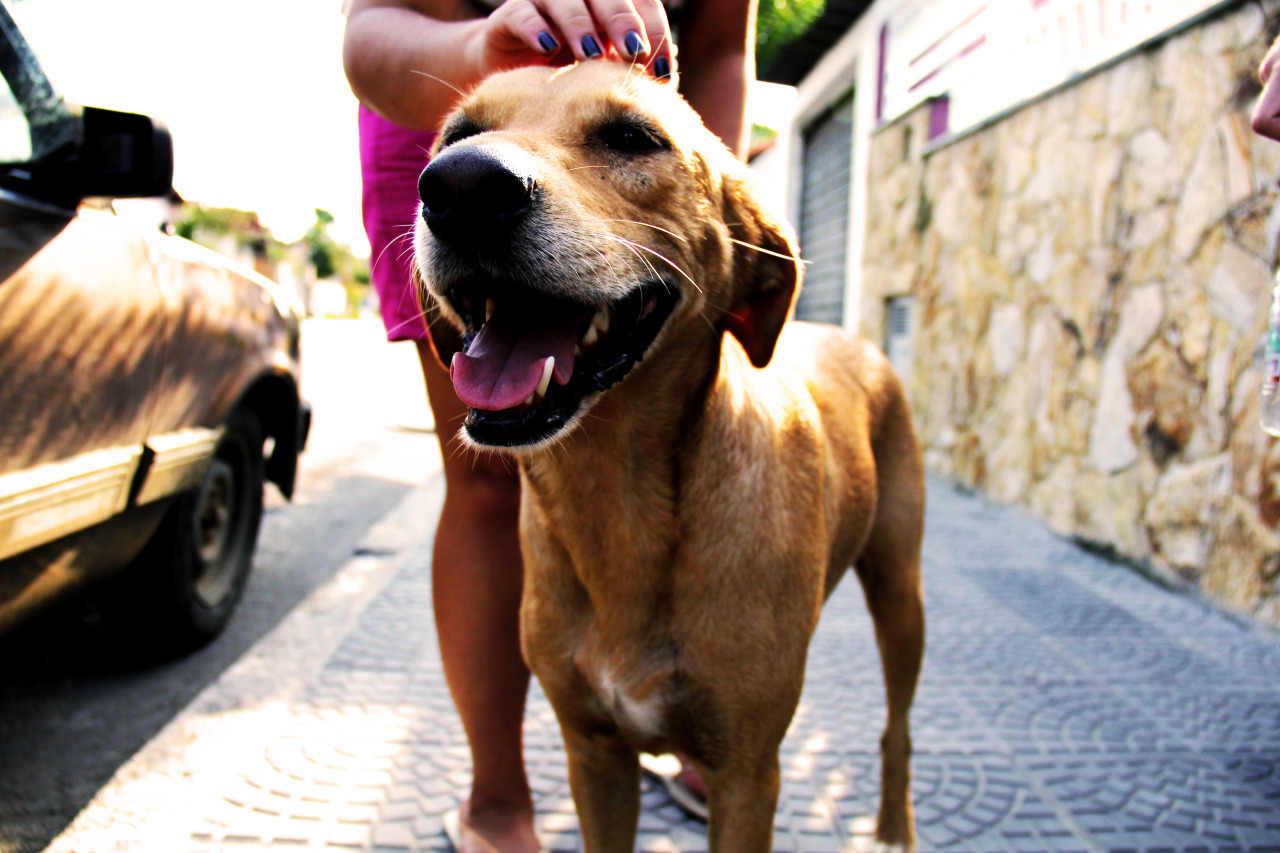
Reddish brown caramelo

In January 2022, the Florianópolis City Council established Dezembro Caramelo ('Caramel December') to raise awareness about dog abandonment. Similarly, the municipality of São Gabriel, Rio Grande do Sul also launched a 'Caramel December' campaign for the welfare of stray animals. The caramelos also reached other Brazilian legislative branches at state and municipal levels.

On April 4, 2025, Christ the Redeemer—one of the New 7 Wonders of the World and a cultural symbol of Brazil—was illuminated with a projection depicting the statue holding a caramelo dog in honor of World Stray Animals Day. The Military Police Museum in Rio de Janeiro features a taxidermied caramelo dog named "Bruto" who accompanied officers in the Paraguayan War in the 19th century.

=== Caramel "firulais" ===
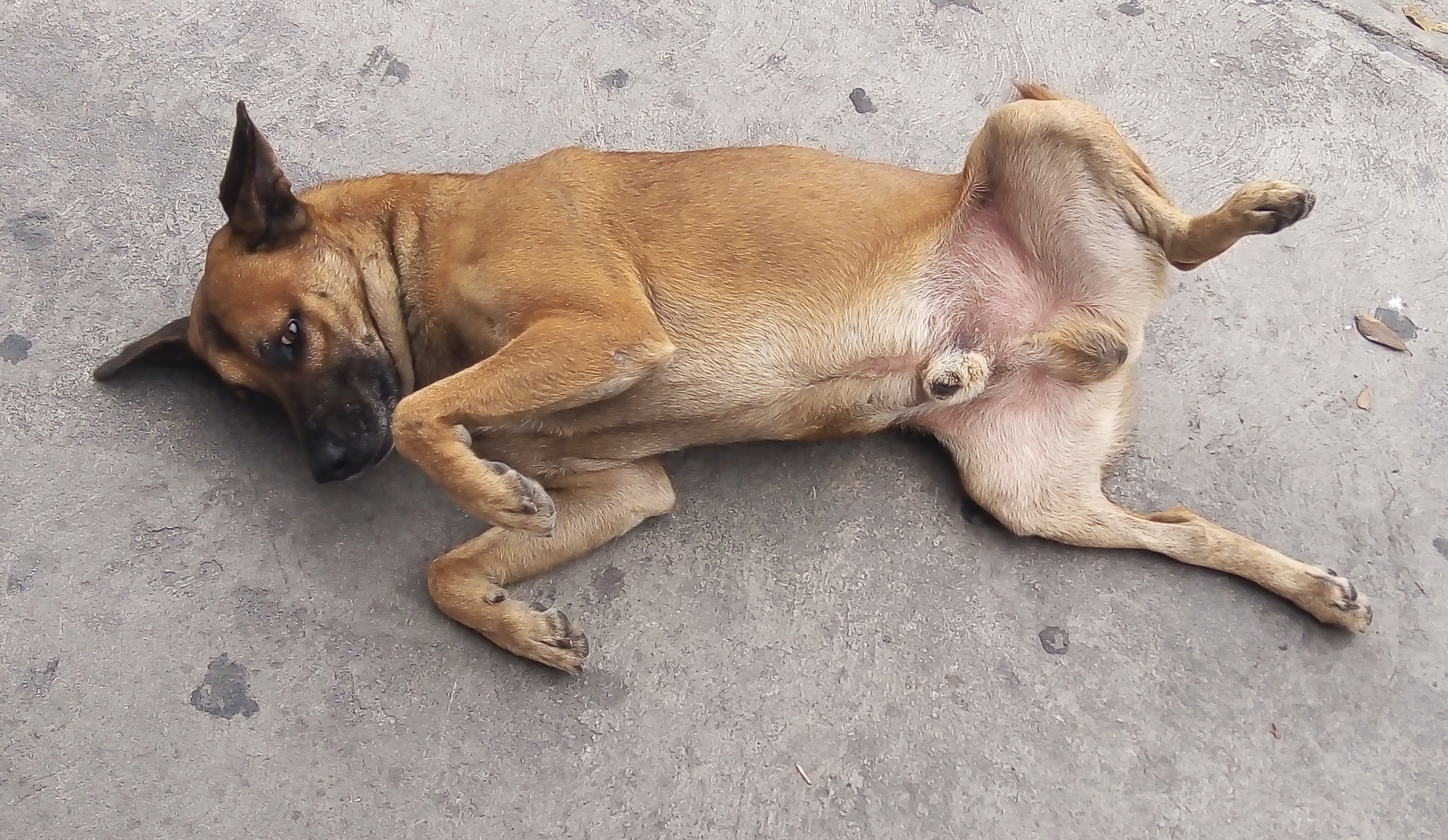
Mexican "perrito amarillo".

Street dogs in Mexico are often called "solovinos", a portmanteau of solo vinos—roughly "[they] came alone"—referring to these dogs that, after roaming alone, began living in the area and were eventually accepted by the community. Another common nickname that came to the use by the Latino community is "firulais", a light-humored quasi-portmanteau due to US-Mexican border agents asking people whether their pets were "free of lice", to which they respond "yes, firulais."

On April 16, 2026, Mexico's Environmental Agency recognized the so-called "perrito amarillo" (Spanish for 'yellow doggy') as an official breed; alongside the Chihuahuas, the Calupohs and the Xoloitzcuintles, the caramelos represent a part of the country's natural and cultural heritage, in addition to the formal recognition of the caramel mutt as a national symbol. The Mexican Secretariat was inspired by a 2025 campaign fomented by the Brazilian government, the purpose of which, likewise, has been to advocate for the cultural significance of stray dogs' ubiquitous interaction with people in the urban environment. By declaring the caramelo dog a national symbol, both governments intended to overcome prejudice against non-purebred animals and encourage the adoption of shelter mongrels.

== Academic ==
Research on interspecies emotion perception has consistently shown that humans are able to identify emotional states in pictures of dogs, whereupon the accuracy of emotion identification was highest for the Belgian Shepherd, followed by the Dobermann, and lowest for the Rhodesian Ridgeback. The researchers suggested that these breeds' markedly distinct appearances could have enhanced, hindered, or otherwise affected the participants' perceptions of subtle facial expressions. Another causal linkage has been conjectured whereby humans' ability to recognize emotions in dogs are developmentally acquired through passive exposure to the manner that, and degree to which, stray dogs are integrated in a socio-cultural setting, including their presence and the general attitude towards street dogs in a given milieu.

An adaptation of Baron Cohen's Mind Reading in the Eyes Test was developed into a cross culturally-valid version of the emotion recognition protocol, and when the study was conducted in Brazil, emotion identification accuracy was highest for the Rhodesian Ridgeback instead, which prompted the researchers to mention the "similar[ity] to common Brazilian stray dogs (Vira-Latas Carmelo [sic])" as corroborative evidence of human ecology influences previously suggested elsewhere. In addition to introducing the caramelo dogs to the academic stage, (Note: Explicitly termed "caramelo", that is) the study also argued that the Baron Cohen's Test, canine version, could provide further insights about individual differences in Theory of Mind (the ability to recognize the thoughts or feelings of others and to predict their behavior).

== See also ==
- Animals taking public transportation
- Askal – Philippine free-ranging dogs
- Black mouth cur
- Carolina dog
- Dingo – Australian canid, most likely descended from domestic dogs
  - Canis lupus dingo § Taxonomic debate
- Gloger's rule – yet another ecogeographical rule for intraspecies pigment variation.
- Human–canine bond
- Indian pariah dog – Indian free-ranging dogs
- Orelha case
- Potcake dog – Caribbean dogs also named after a food
