= Mongrel =

Dog of mixed breeds

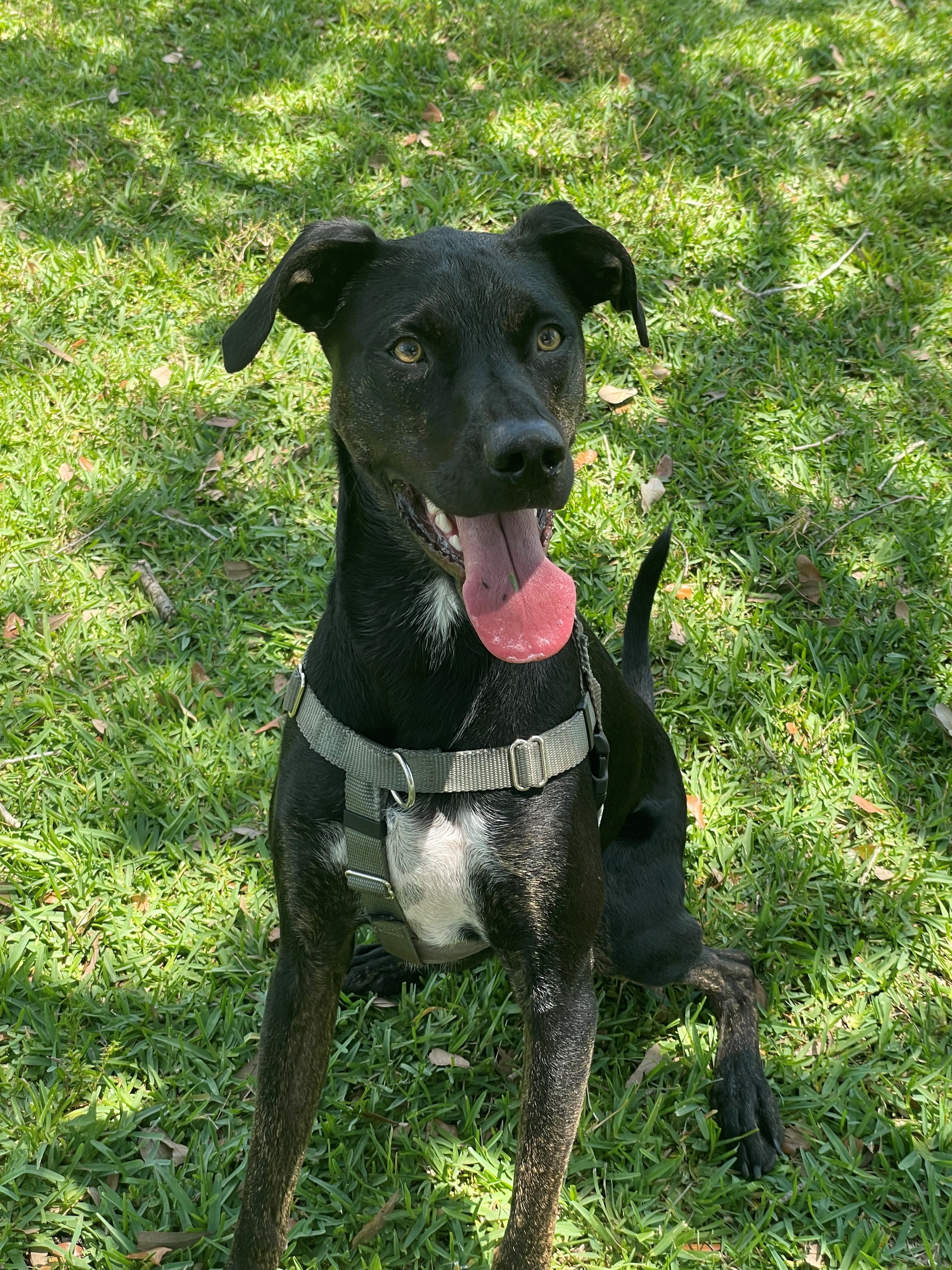
A bi-color mongrel. DNA sequencing shows a heritage of Boxer, American Pit Bull, and Great Dane, amongst others.

A mongrel, mutt, or mixed-breed dog is any dog which does not belong to one officially recognized breed. While such terms may refer to all dogs of mixed breeds, the terms "dog crossbreed" and "designer dog" specifically refer to mixed-breed dogs which are intentionally bred.

Mixed-breed dogs may have ancestries that include any combination of purebred dogs and other mongrels.

Excluding designer dogs, mixed-breed dogs are generally considered less financially valuable than purebred dogs. Mixed-breed dogs are thought to be less susceptible to the genetic health problems associated with inbreeding (following the concept of heterosis or "hybrid vigor").

Estimates place the population of mixed-breed dogs at 150 million animals worldwide.

== Terminology ==
=== Mixed-breed and crossbreed ===
In the United States, the term mixed-breed is a favored synonym over mongrel among people who wish to avoid negative connotations associated with the latter term. The implication that such dogs must be a mix of defined breeds may stem from an inverted understanding of the origins of dog breeds. Purebred dogs have been, for the most part, artificially created from random-bred populations by human selective breeding with the purpose of enhancing desired physical, behavioral, or temperamental characteristics. Dogs that are not purebred are not necessarily a mix of such defined breeds. Therefore, among some experts and fans of such dogs, mongrel is still the preferred term.

Dog crossbreeds, crossbreed dogs, or designer dogs, are mixed-breed dogs which are often the product of artificial selection and intentionally created by humans.

=== Naming conventions ===
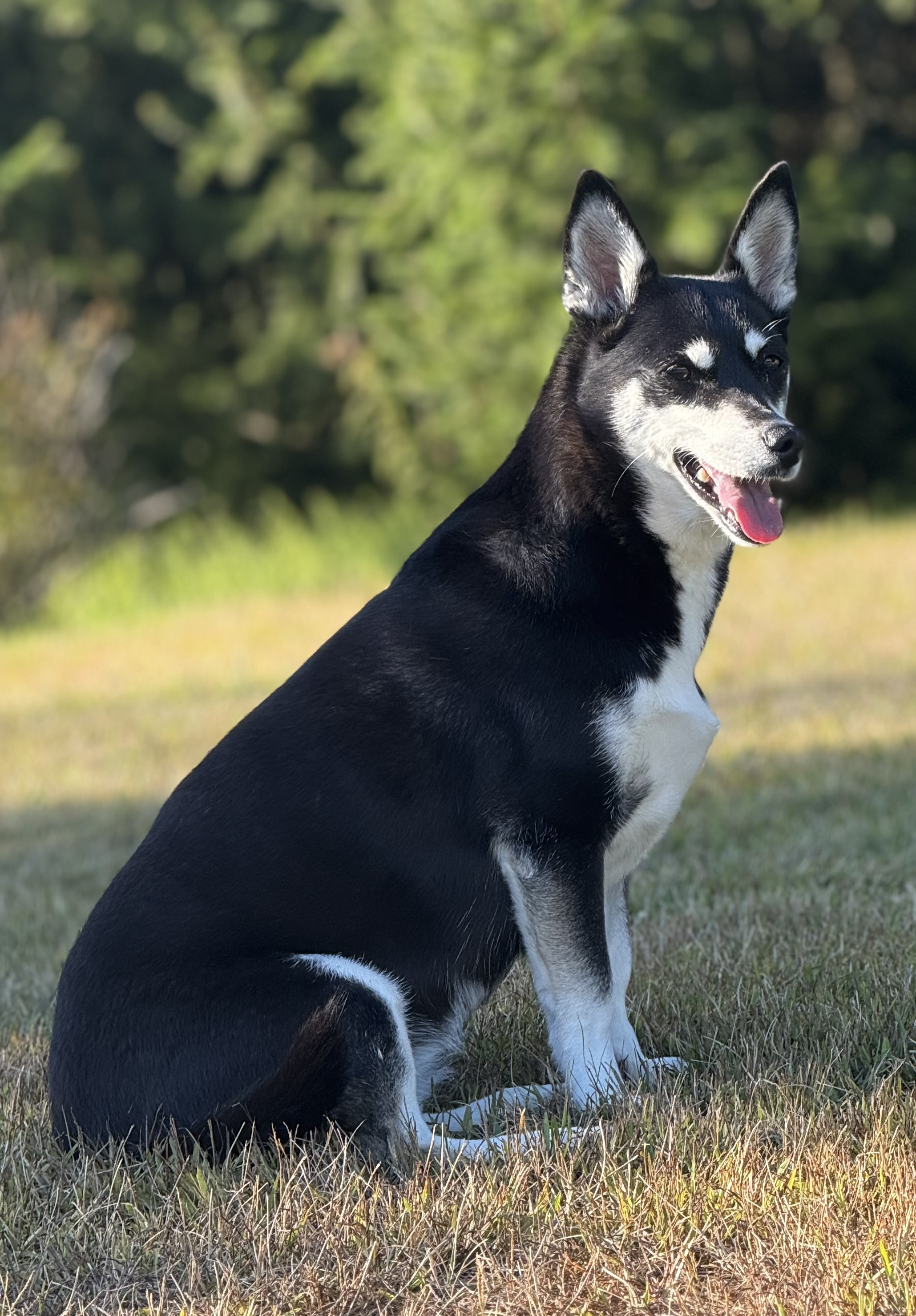
A Corgi-Siberian Husky mix, sometimes referred to as a "corgsky", "siborgi", or "horgi", portmanteaus of the two breeds' names

Mixed-breed dogs may either be referred to by a combination of their breeds (if known); e.g. "Corgi-Siberian Husky"; or via a portmanteau, e.g. "corgsky", "siborgi", or "horgi ", in the case of a Corgi-Siberian Husky. Portmanteaus are particularly popular with designer dogs, for example; the schnoodle (Schnauzer and Poodle cross), shepsky (German Shepherd Dog/Siberian Husky cross), the puggle (Pug and Beagle cross), and the German chusky (German Shepherd Dog, Siberian Husky and Chow Chow cross). The resultant portmanteau names are generally not capitalized as they are not officially recognized dog breeds, though this practice varies.

=== Regional and slang terms ===
The words cur, tyke, mutt, and mongrel are used, sometimes in a derogatory manner. There are also regional terms for mixed-breed dogs. In the United Kingdom, mongrel is the unique technical word for a mixed-breed dog. North Americans generally prefer the term mix or mixed-breed. Mutt is also commonly used in the United States and Canada. Some American registries and dog clubs that accept mixed-breed dogs use the term All-American to describe mixed-breed dogs.

There are also names for mixed-breeds based on geography, behavior, or food. In Hawaii, mixes are referred to as poi dogs, although they are not related to the extinct Hawaiian Poi Dog. In the Bahamas and the Turks and Caicos Islands, the common term is potcake dogs (referring to the table scraps they are fed). In South Africa, the tongue-in-cheek expression pavement special is sometimes used as a description for a mixed-breed dog. In Trinidad and Tobago, these mixed dogs are referred to as pot hounds (pothong). In Serbia, a similar expression is prekoplotski avlijaner (over-the-fence yard-dweller). In Russia, a colloquial term дворняга (yard-dweller) is used most commonly. In the Philippines, mixed-breed street dogs are often called askal, a Tagalog-derived contraction of asong kalye ("street dog"), while in Singapore, they are known as Singapore Specials. In Puerto Rico, they are known as satos; in Venezuela they are called yusos or cacris, the latter being a contraction of the words callejero criollo (literally, street creole, as street dogs are usually mongrels); and in Chile and Bolivia, they are called quiltros. In Costa Rica, it is common to hear the word zaguate, a term originating from a Nahuatl term, zahuatl, that refers to the disease called scabies. In the rural southern United States, a small hunting dog is known as a feist. In Yucatan Peninsula, Mexico, they are called "malix" (ma.liʃ), meaning "no breed" in Yucatec Mayan.

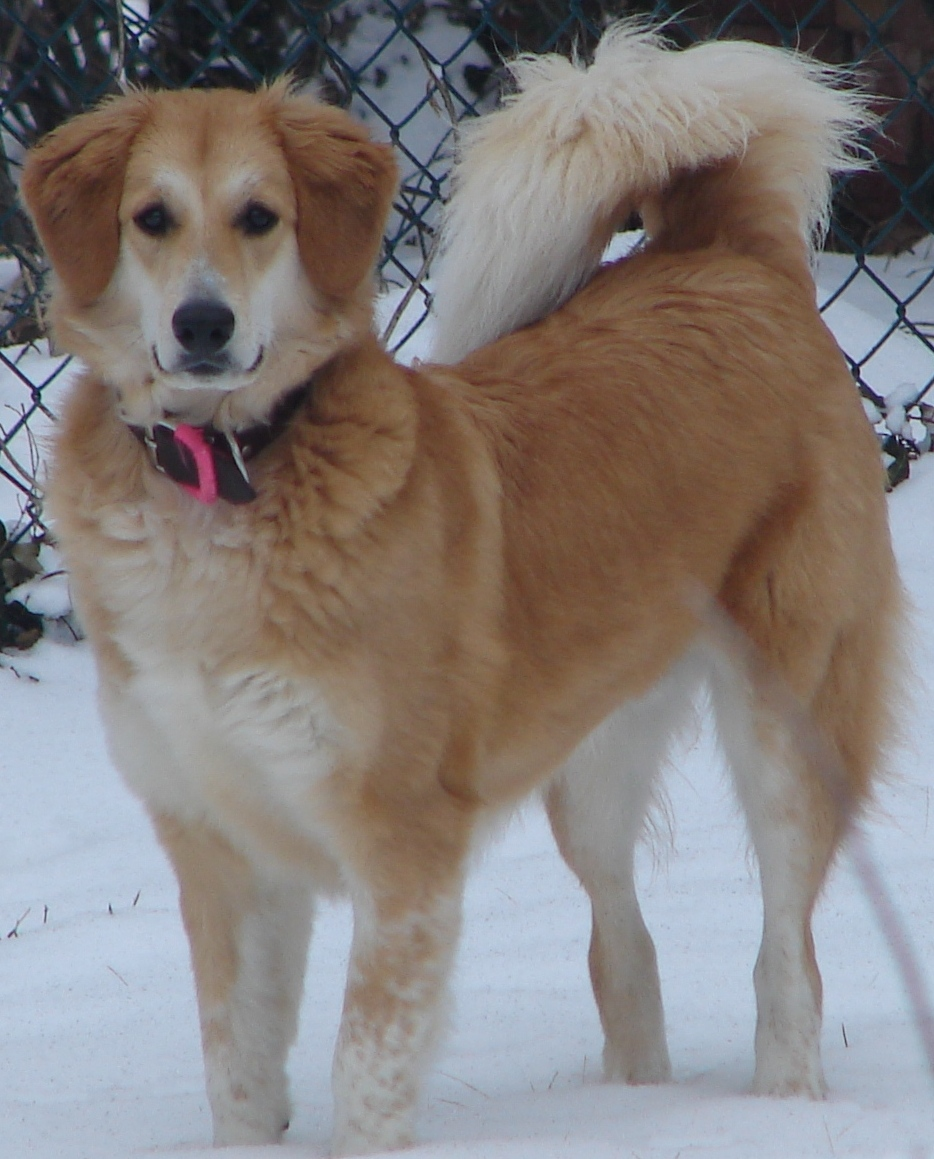
A mutt with a heavy, counter-shaded winter coat

Slang terms are also common. Heinz 57, Heinz, or Heinz Hound is often used for dogs of uncertain ancestry, in a playful reference to the "57 Varieties" slogan of the H. J. Heinz Company. In some countries, such as Australia, bitsa (or bitzer) is sometimes used, meaning "bits o' this, bits o' that". In Brazil and the Dominican Republic, the name for mixed-breed dogs is vira-lata (trash-can tipper) because of homeless dogs who knock over trash cans to reach discarded food. In Newfoundland, Canada, a smaller mixed-breed dog is known as a cracky, hence the colloquial expression "saucy as a cracky" for someone with a sharp tongue. In Sweden, these dogs might be humorously referred to as a gatu korsning, which translates to intersection, but literally to 'street crossing'.

== Determining ancestry ==
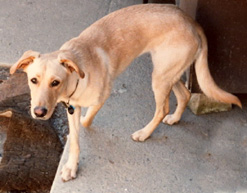
This Golden Retriever/German Shepherd mix has on average more mongrel traits than any distinct traits of either parents' breed.

Guessing a mixed-breed's ancestry can be difficult even for knowledgeable dog observers, because mixed-breeds have much more genetic variation than purebreds. For example, two black mixed-breed dogs might each have recessive genes that produce a blond coat and, therefore, produce offspring looking unlike their parents.

In 2007 genetic analysis became publicly available. The companies claim their DNA-based diagnostic test can genetically determine the breed composition of mixed-breed dogs. These tests are still limited in scope because only a small number of the hundreds of dog breeds have been validated against the tests, and because the same breed in different geographical areas may have different genetic profiles. The tests do not test for breed purity, but for genetic sequences that are common to certain breeds. With a mixed-breed dog, the test is not proof of purebred ancestry, but rather an indication that those dogs share common ancestry with certain purebreds. The American Kennel Club does not recognize the use of DNA tests to determine breed.

Many newer dog breeds can be traced back to a common foundational breed, making them difficult to separate genetically. For example, Labrador Retrievers, Flat-coated Retrievers, Chesapeake Bay Retrievers, and Newfoundland dogs share a common ancestry with the St. John's water dog –a now-extinct naturally occurring dog landrace from the island of Newfoundland.

== Health ==
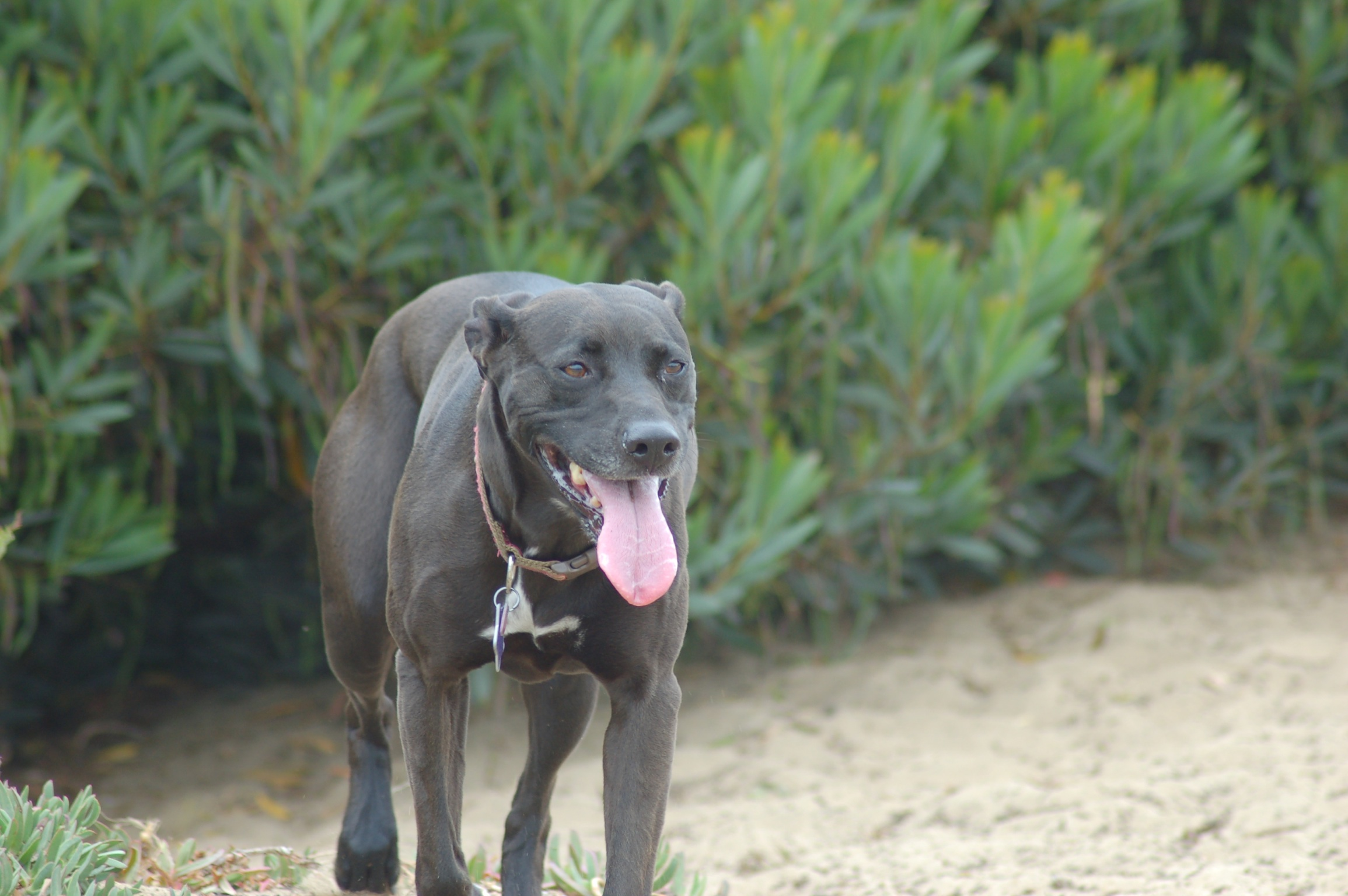
Six-year old female American Pit Bull Terrier and Labrador mix

The theory of hybrid vigor suggests that as a group, dogs of varied ancestry will be generally healthier than their purebred counterparts. In purebred dogs, intentionally breeding dogs of very similar appearance over several generations produces animals that carry many of the same alleles, some of which are detrimental. If the founding population for the breed was small, then the genetic diversity of that particular breed may be small for quite some time.

When humans select certain dogs for new breeds, they artificially isolate that group of genes and cause more copies of that gene to be made than might have otherwise occurred in nature. The population is initially more fragile because of the lack of genetic diversity. If the dog breed is popular, and the line continues, over hundreds of years diversity increases due to mutations and occasional out-breeding. This is why some of the very old breeds are more stable. One issue is when certain traits found in the breed standard are associated with genetic disorders. The artificial selective force favors the duplication of the genetic disorder because it comes with a desired physical trait. The genetic health of hybrids tends to be higher. Healthy traits have been lost in many purebred dog lines because many breeders of showdogs are more interested in conformation – the physical attributes of the dogs in relation to the breed standard – than in the health and working temperament for which the dog was originally bred.

Populations are vulnerable when the dogs bred are closely related. Inbreeding among purebreds has exposed various genetic health problems not always readily apparent in less uniform populations. Mixed-breed dogs are more genetically diverse due to the more haphazard nature of their parents' mating. The offspring of such matings might be less likely to express certain genetic disorders because there might be a decreased chance that both parents carry the same detrimental recessive alleles, but some deleterious recessives occur across many seemingly unrelated breeds, and therefore merely mixing breeds is no guarantee of genetic health. When two poor specimens are bred, the offspring could inherit the worst traits of both parents. This is commonly seen in dogs that came from puppy mills.

Several studies have shown that mixed-breed dogs have a health advantage over purebred dogs. A German study finds that "mongrels require less veterinary treatment". Studies in Sweden have found that "Mongrel dogs are less prone to many diseases than the average purebred dog" and, when referring to death rates, that "mongrels were consistently in the low risk category". Data from Denmark also suggest that mixed breeds have greater longevity on average compared to purebreds. A British study showed similar results, but a few breeds (notably Jack Russell Terriers, Miniature Poodles and Whippets) lived longer than mixed breeds, although this is due to the small size of the breeds and the correlation between size and age in dog breeds.

In one study, the effect of breed on longevity in the pet dog was analyzed using mortality data from 23,535 pet dogs. The data were obtained from North American veterinary teaching hospitals. The median age at death was determined for purebred and mixed-breed dogs of different body weights. Within each body weight category, the median age at death was lower for purebred dogs compared with mixed-breed dogs. The median age at death was "8.5 years for all mixed breed dogs, and 6.7 years for all pure breed dogs" in the study.

In 2013, a study found that mixed breeds live on average 1.2 years longer than purebreds, and that increasing body weight was negatively correlated with longevity (i.e. the heavier the dog, the shorter its lifespan). Another study published in 2019 confirmed this 1.2 year difference in lifespan for mixed-breed dogs, and further demonstrated negative impacts of recent inbreeding and benefits of occasional outcrossing for lifespan in individual dogs.

Studies that have been done in the area of health show that mixed-breeds on average are both healthier and longer-lived than their purebred relations. This is because current accepted breeding practices within the pedigreed dog community result in a reduction in genetic diversity, and can result in physical characteristics that lead to health issues.

Studies have shown that crossbreed dogs have a number of desirable reproductive traits. Scott and Fuller found that crossbreed dogs were superior mothers compared to purebred mothers, producing more milk and giving better care. These advantages led to a decreased mortality in the offspring of crossbreed dogs.

== Popular culture ==
In the UK, author Jilly Cooper wrote books on mongrels: Intelligent and Loyal, which is one of the earliest works entirely dedicated to the type, and the series of children's books Little Mabel, which features the misadventures of a mongrel puppy called Mabel. To gather stories about mongrels for Intelligent and Loyal, Cooper put an advert in newspapers asking people to share stories about their pets for the book.

The Brazilian vira-lata caramelo (Brazilian Portuguese for 'caramel trashcan-tipper') (Note: The "caramelo" dog designation encompasses a range of different phenotypic traits, so long as they include the characteristic caramel-coloured coat.) are widely cherished in Brazil. They are both popularly and formally considered a national symbol, often associated with Brazilian diversity pride.

== Gallery ==
Examples of mongrels
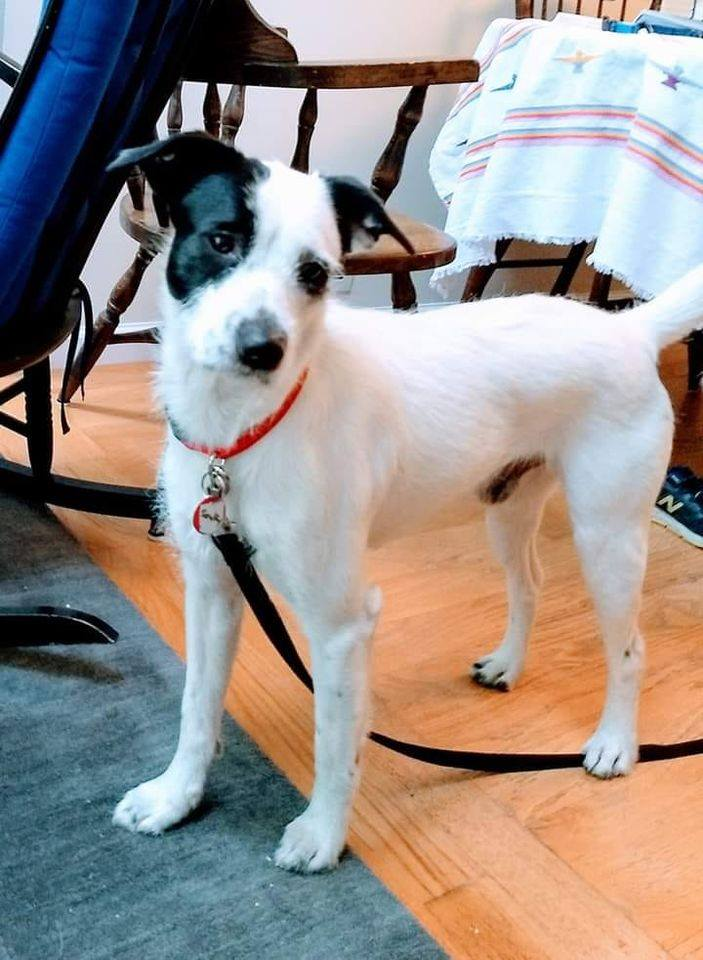
DNA sequencing showed this mongrel dog to be a mix of Labrador Retriever, Bull Mastiff, Chow Chow, Australian Cattle Dog, Corgi, and Pit Bull.

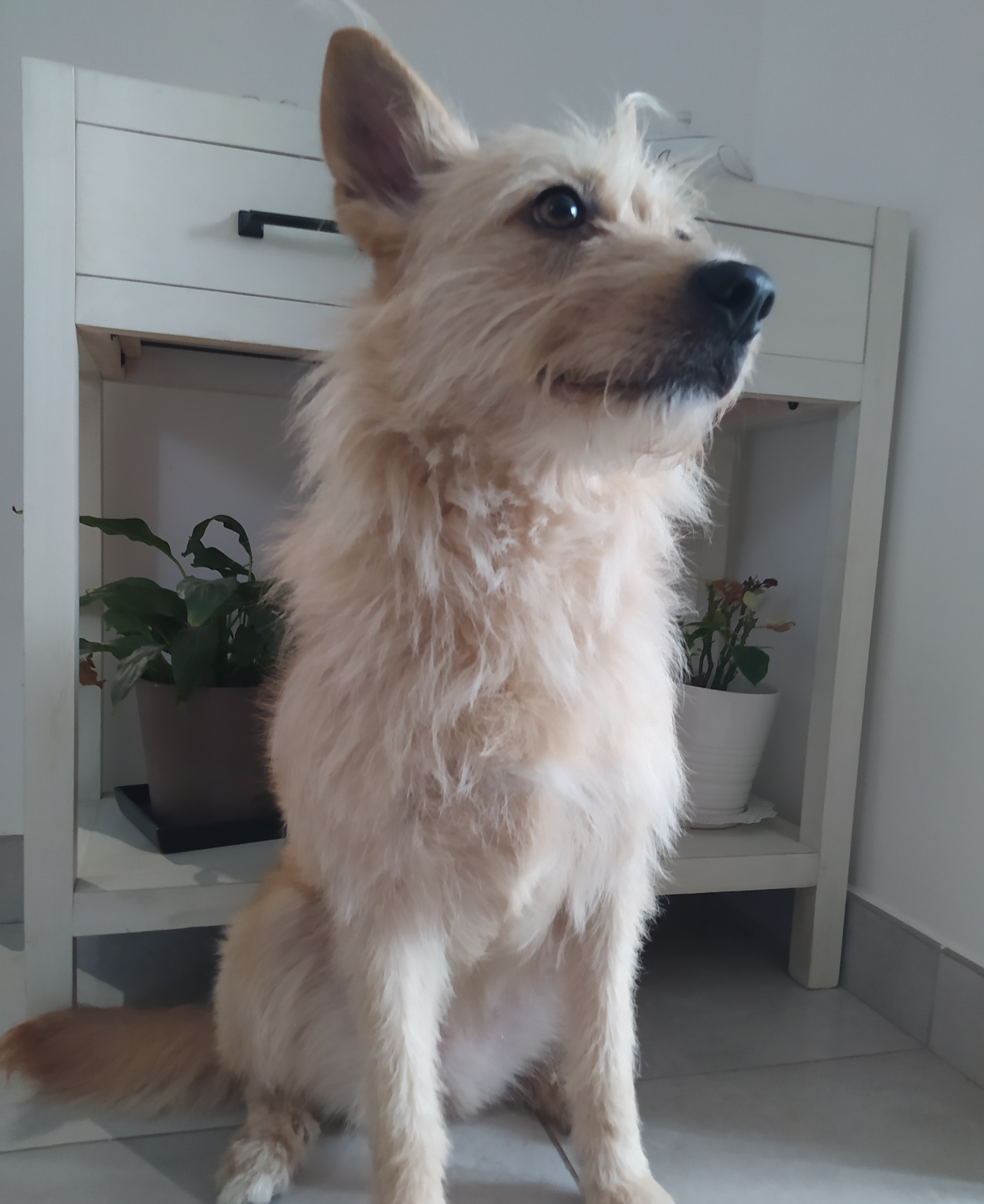
Spinone Italiano–German Shepherd mixed-breed dog

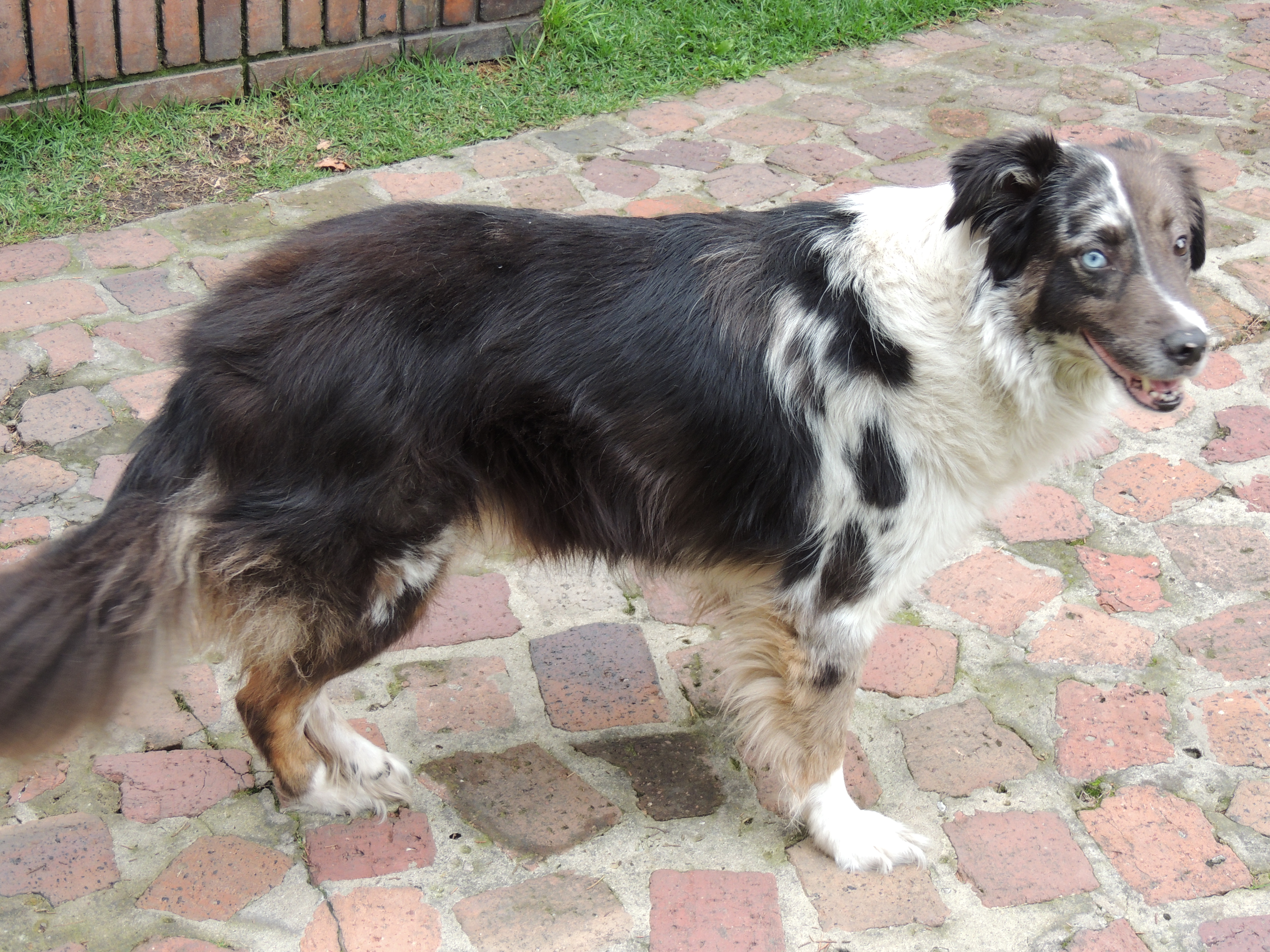
Australian Shepherd–Border Collie mixed-breed dog

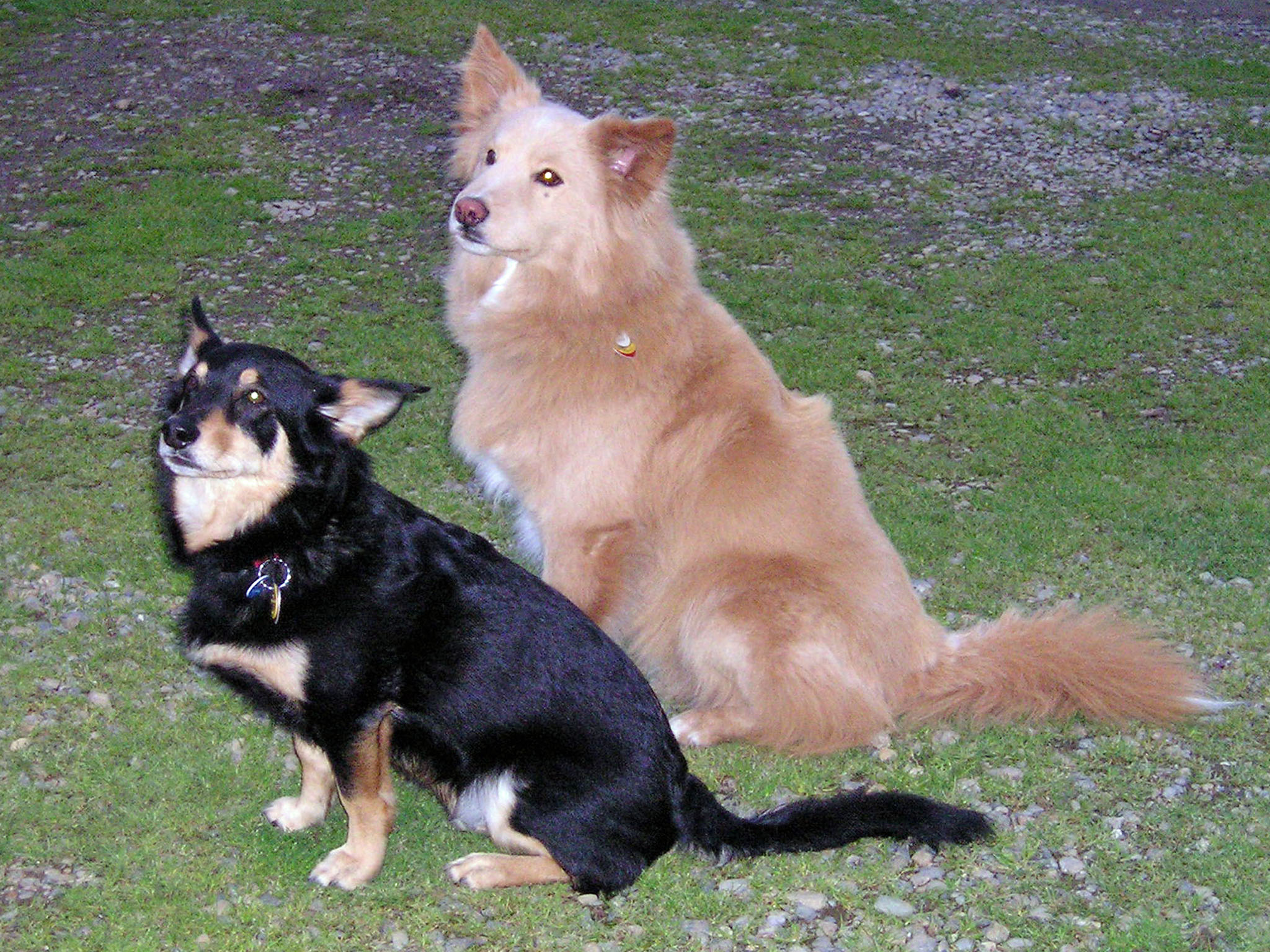
Although these mongrels are littermates of an Australian Shepherd mother, they look quite different and neither exactly resembles that breed.

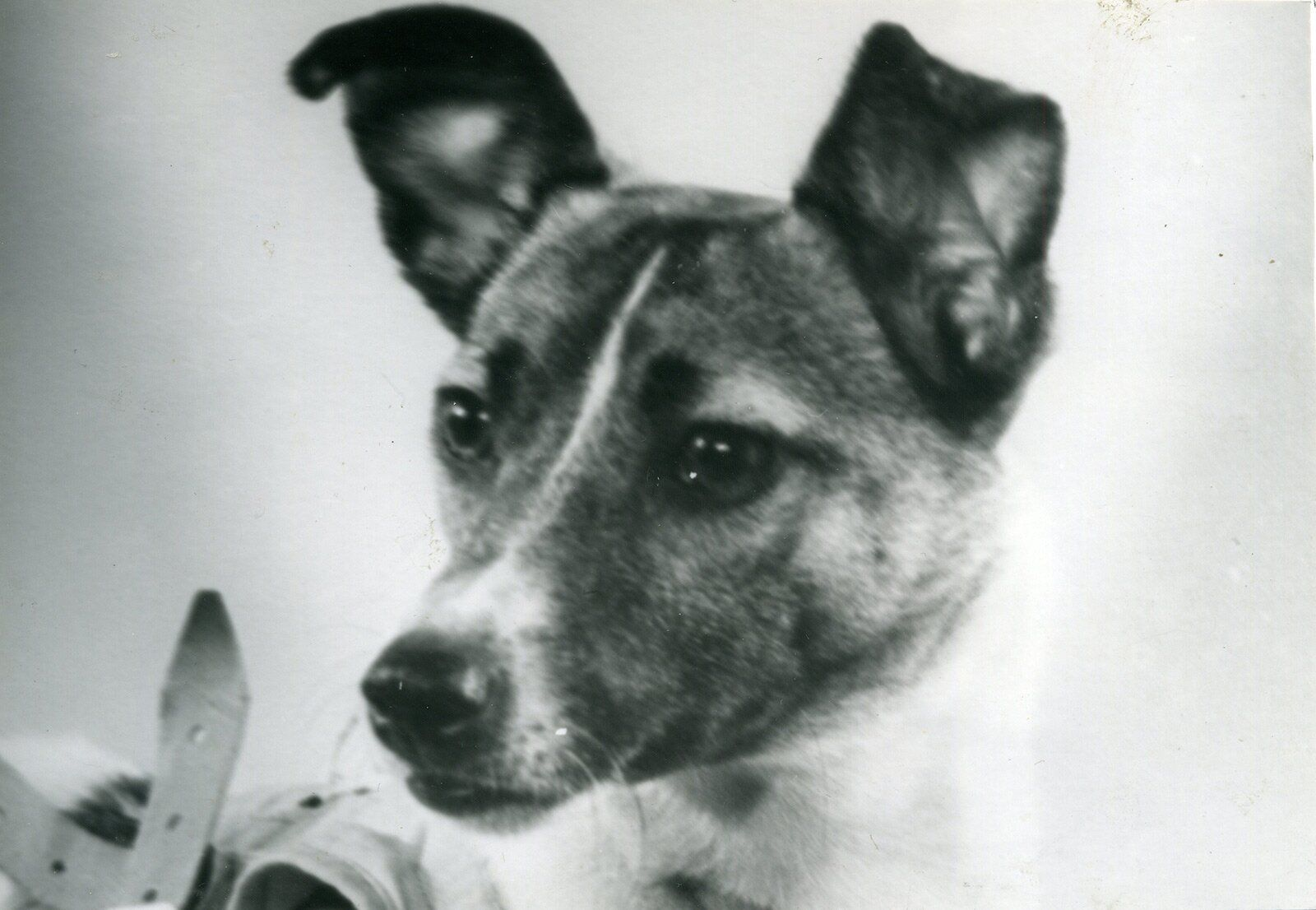
Laika, one of the first animals in space and first to orbit the earth possibly part-husky (or part-Samoyed) and part-terrier

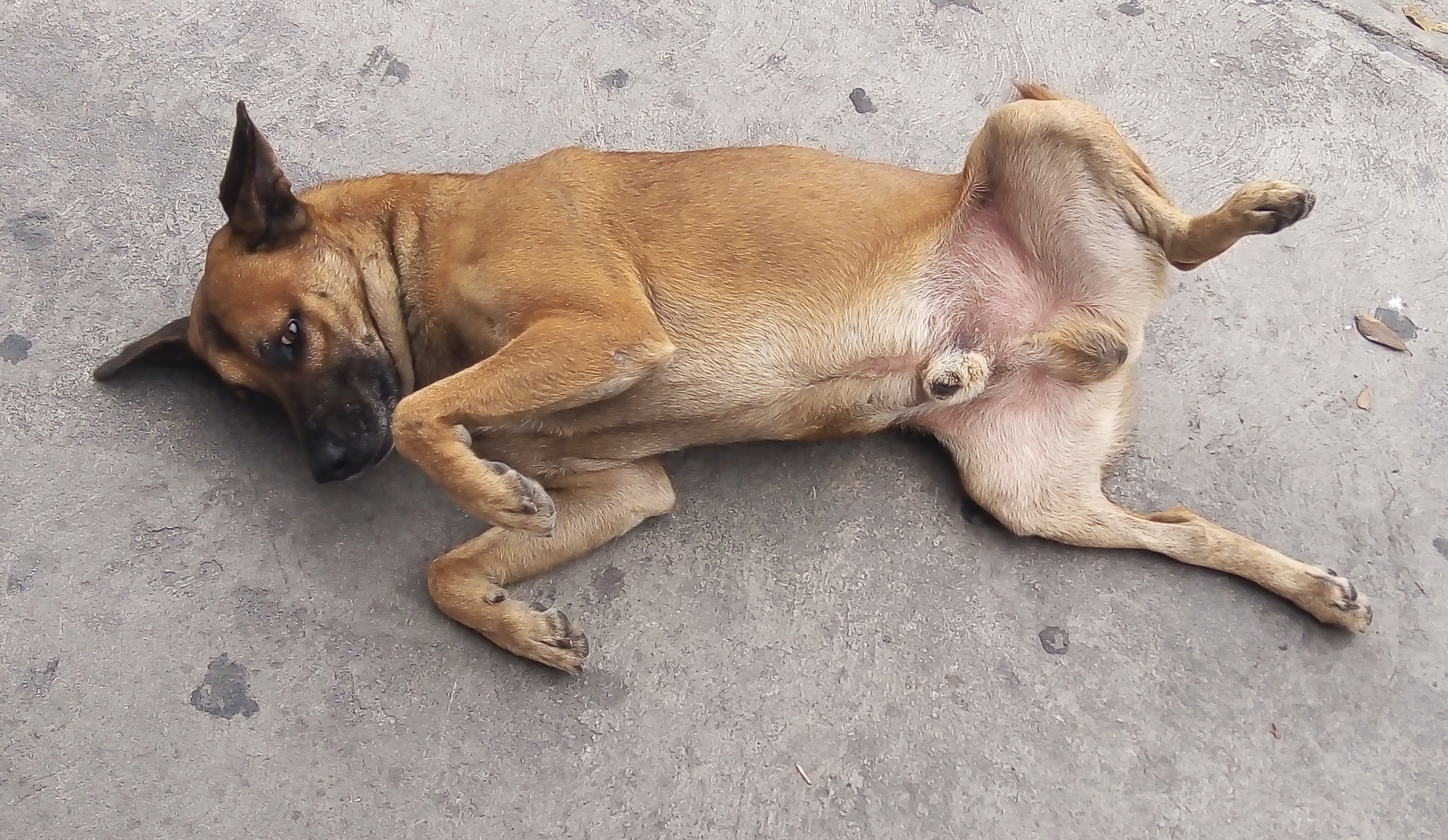
A Mexican street mutt

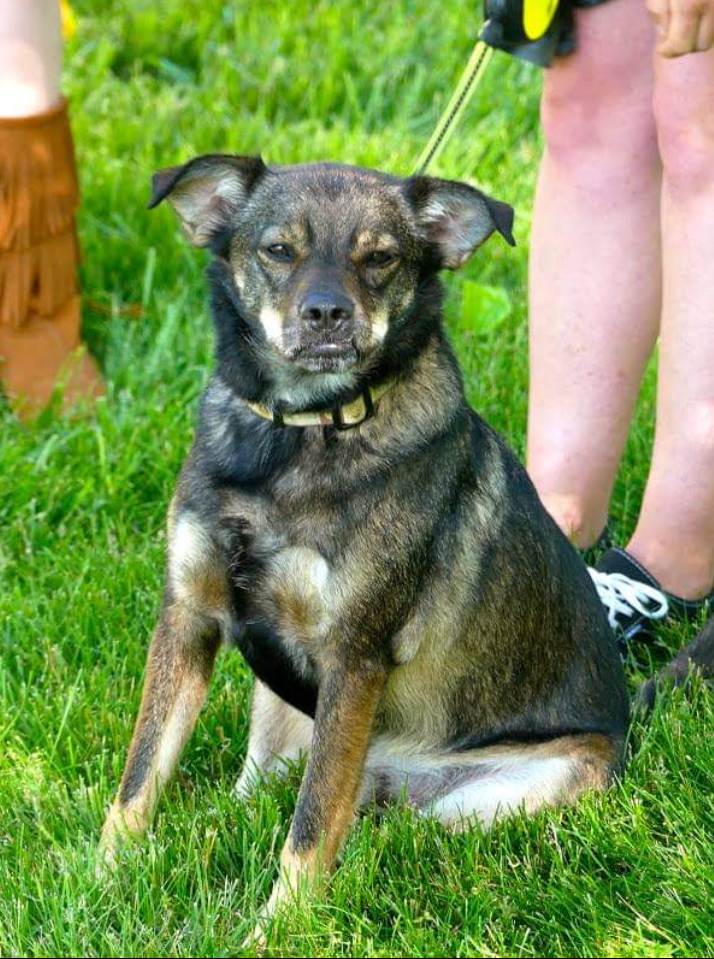
Mongrel of visually indeterminable lineage

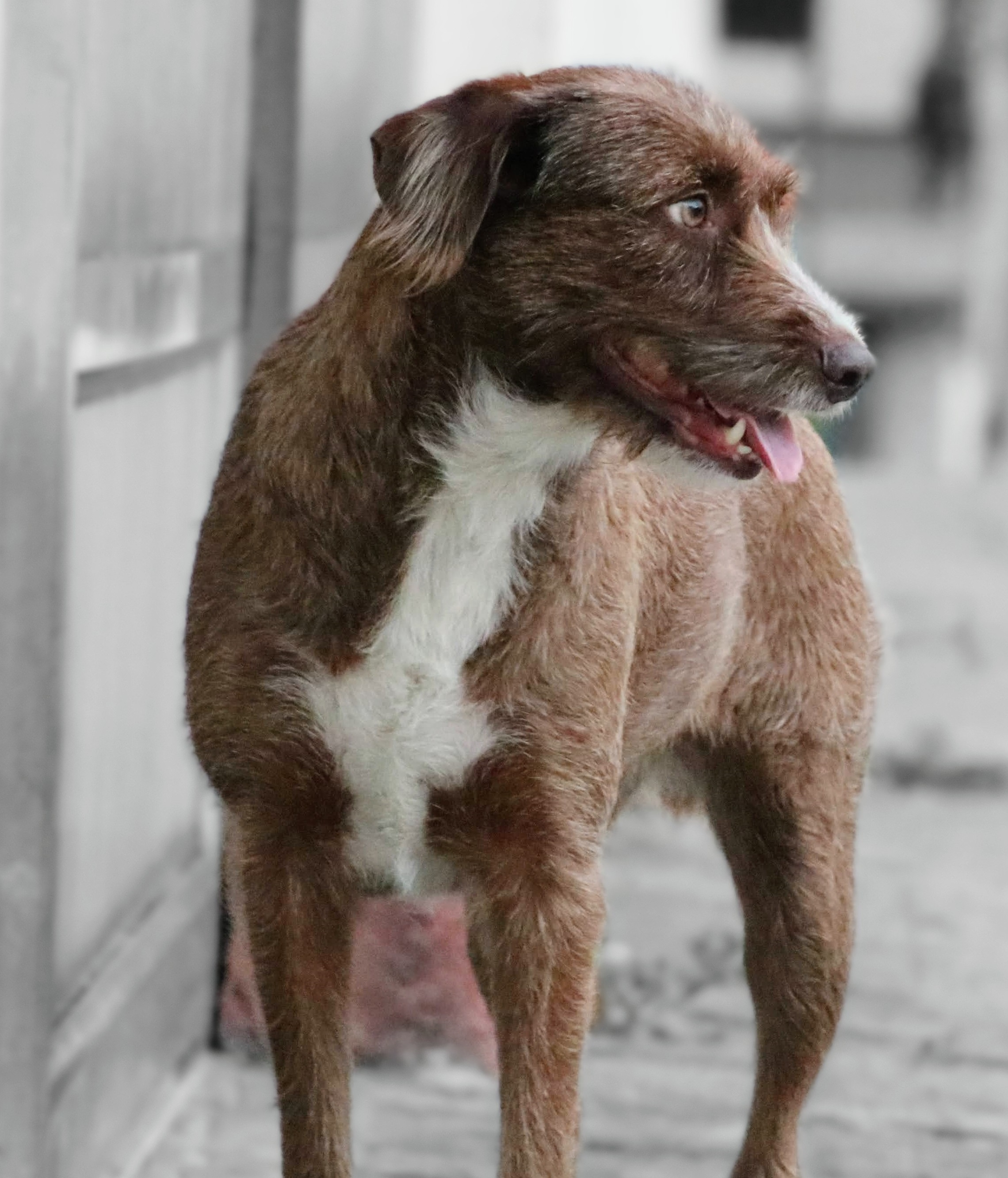
Mid-size Brazilian mixed-breed dog

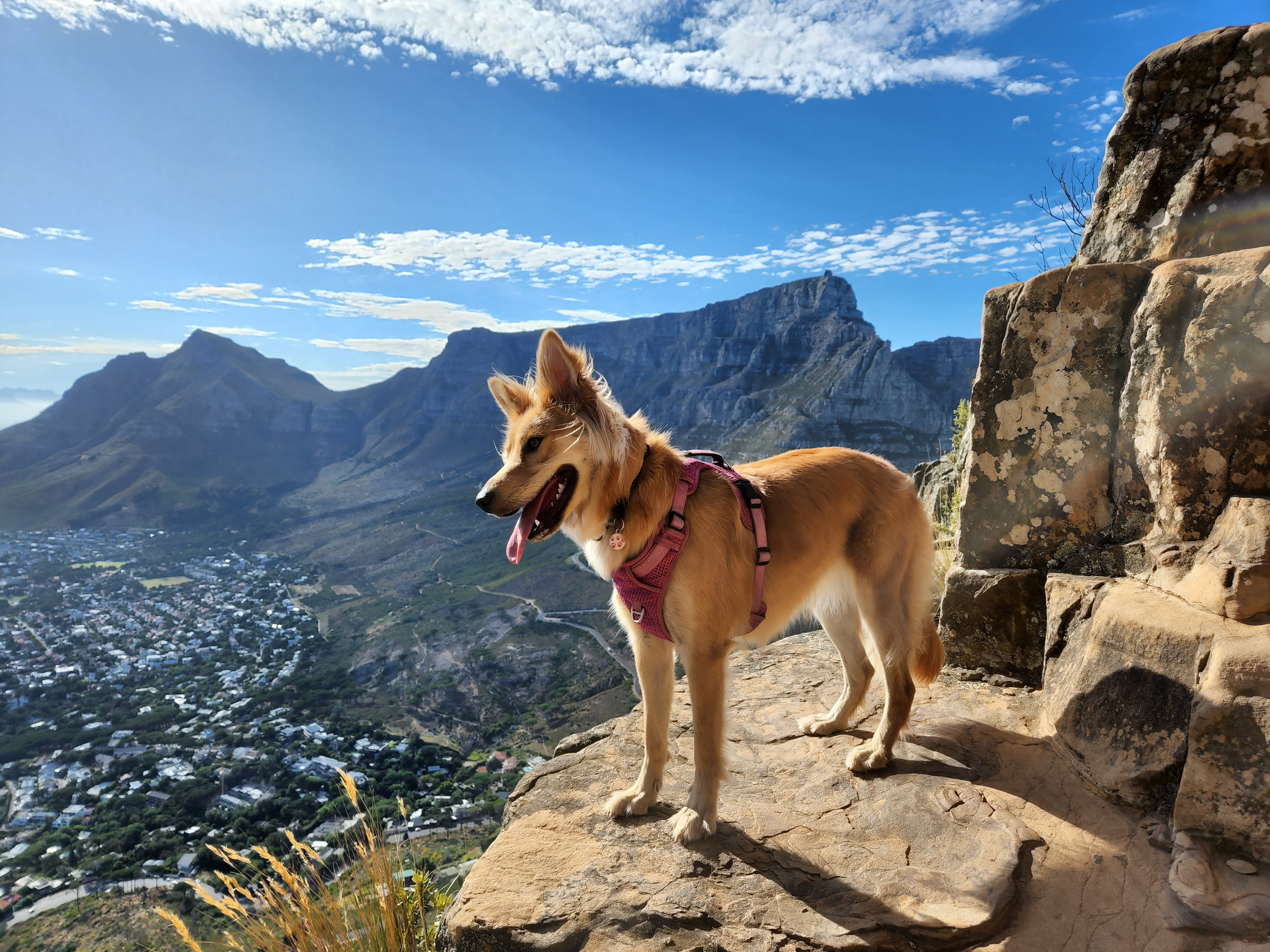
A two-year-old dog of unknown parentage, possibly Australian Shepherd and Golden Retriever

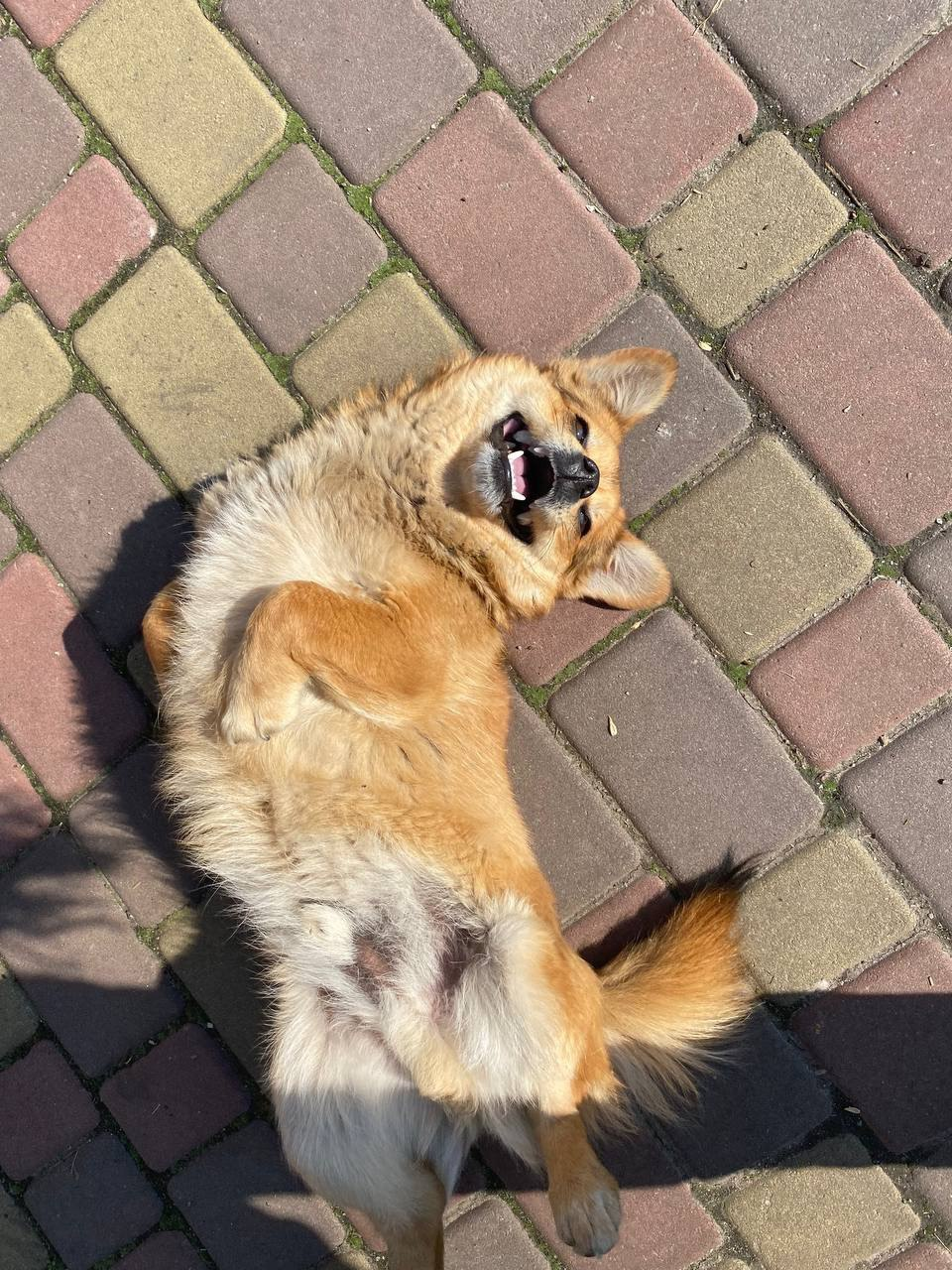
Ukrainian mixed-breed dog

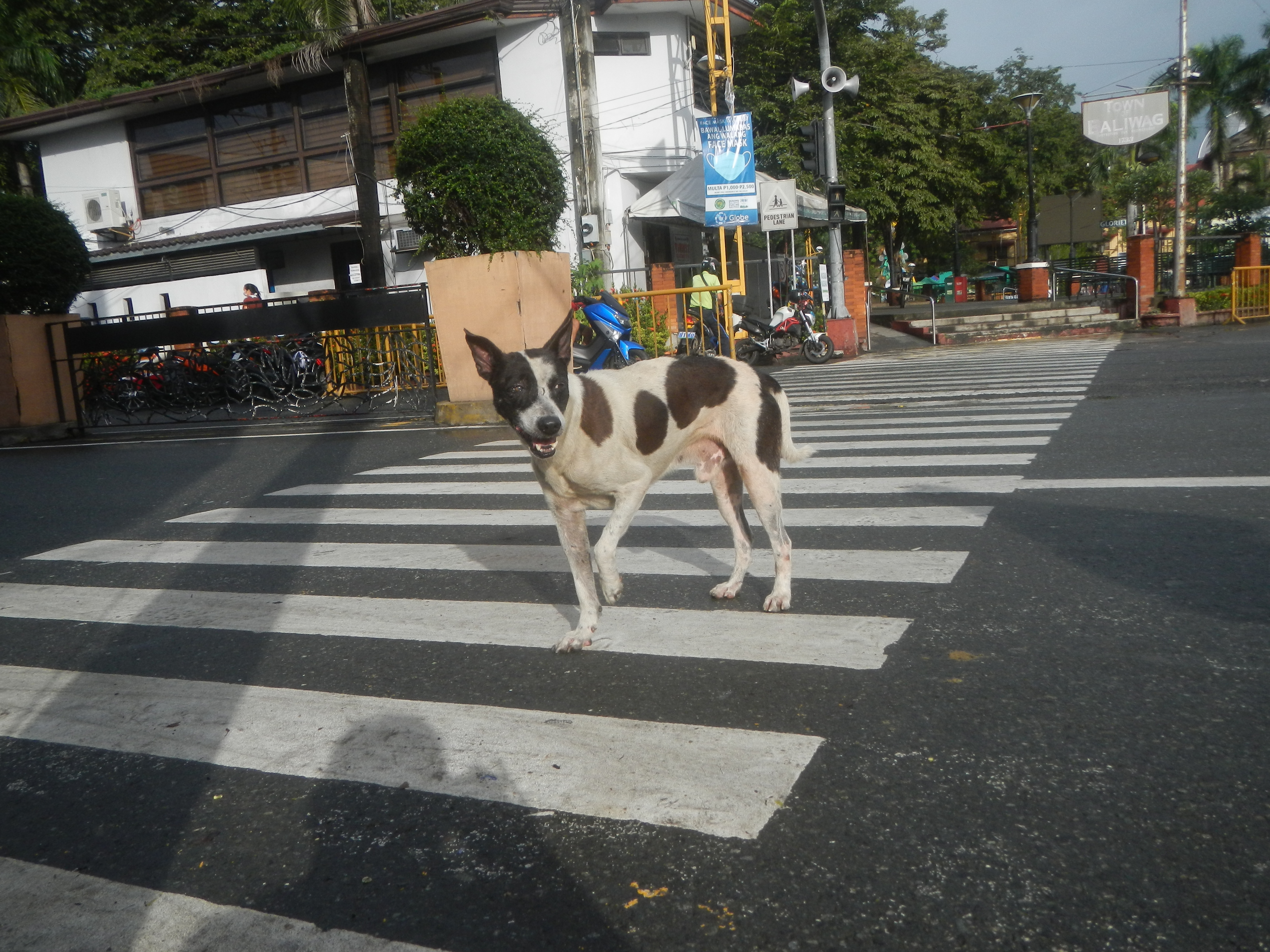
Askal, a street dog commonly seen in the Philippines

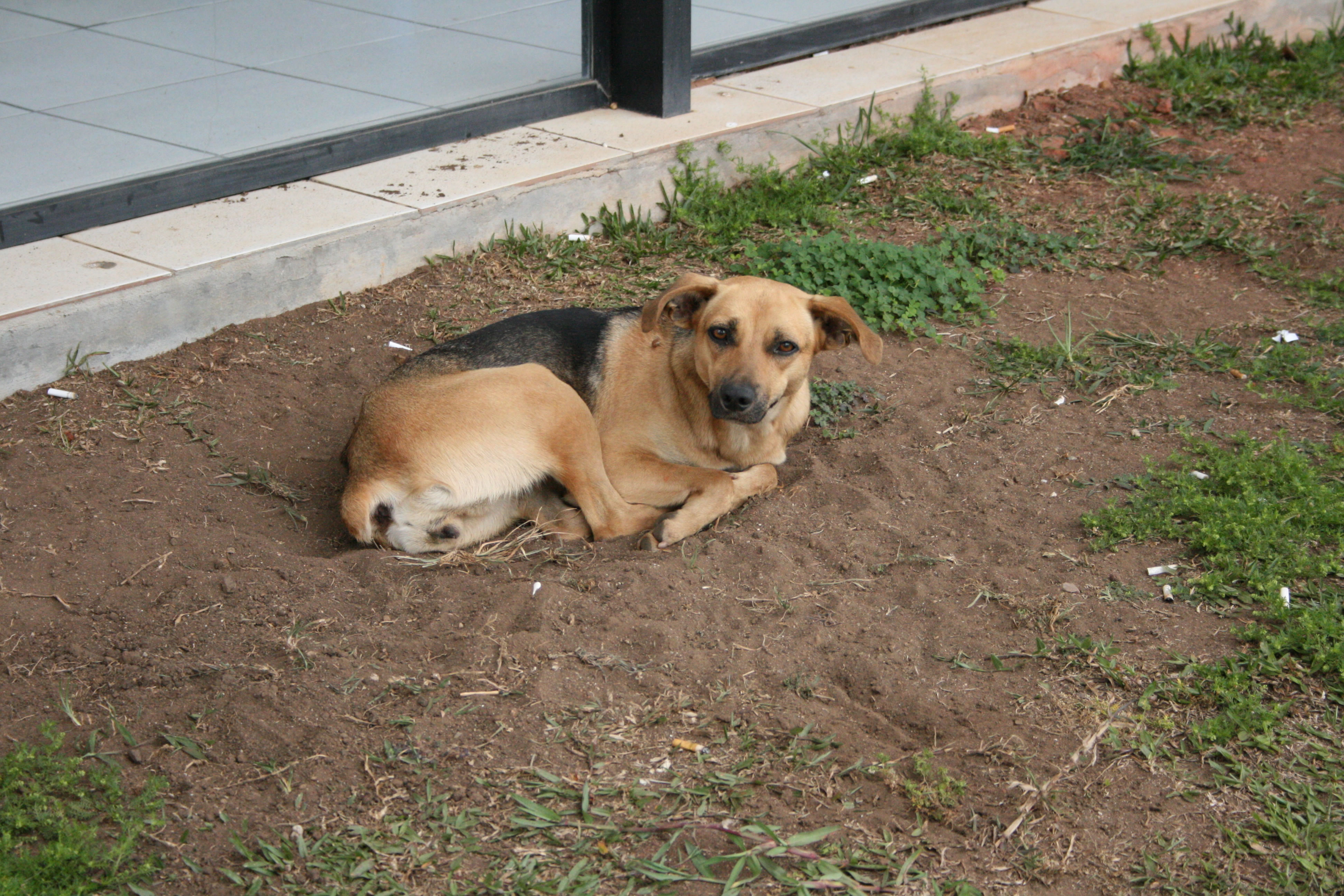
Caramelo –a Brazilian mixed-breed

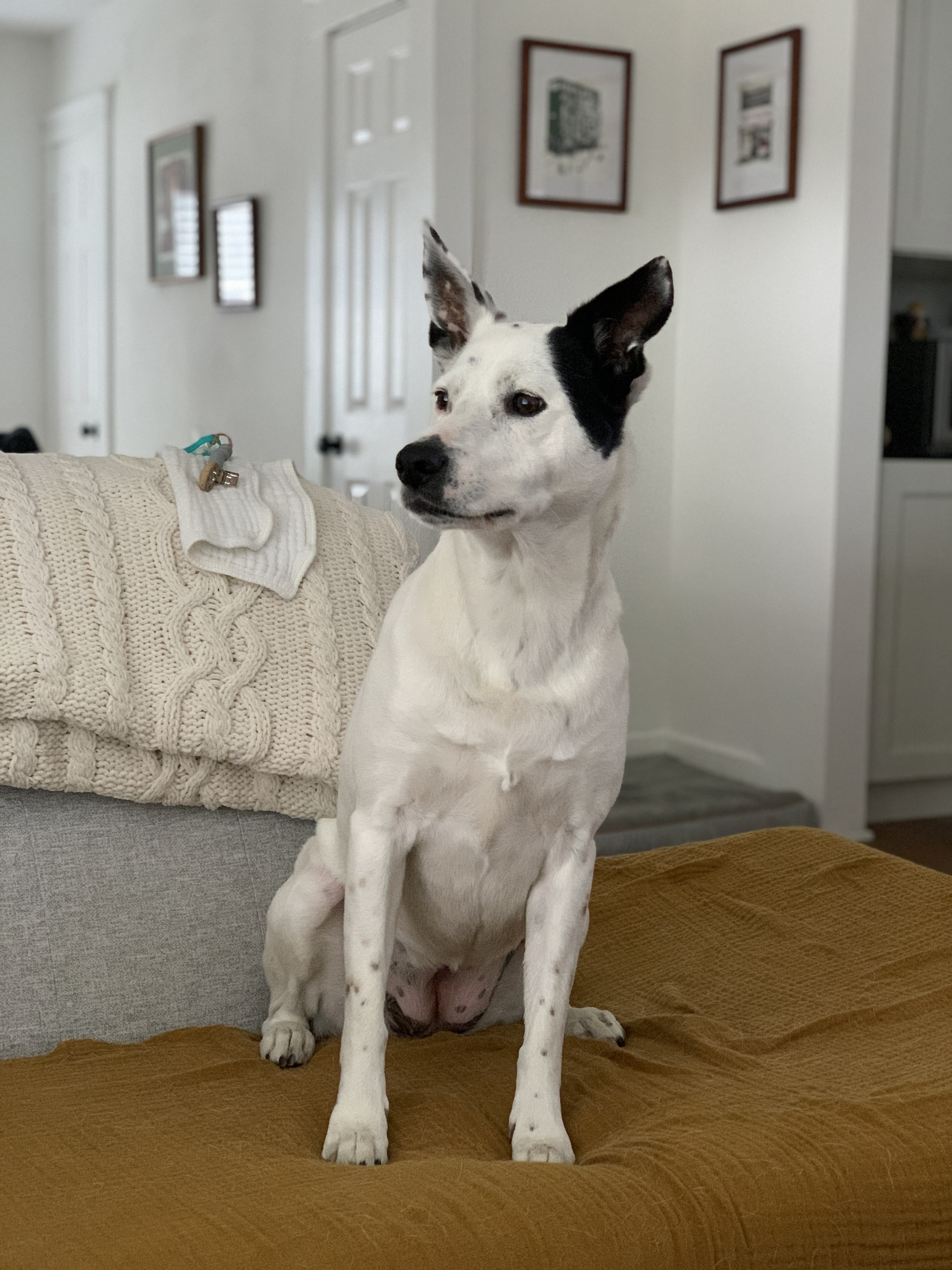
A mongrel dog with German Shepherd, Shetland Sheepdog, American Staffordshire Terrier, Chow Chow heritage, amongst others

== See also ==
- Black mouth cur
- Free-ranging dog
- Indian pariah dog
- List of dog breeds
- Lurcher
- Moggy
- Pye-dog
- Rez dog
- Street dog
