= Potcake dog =

Potcake
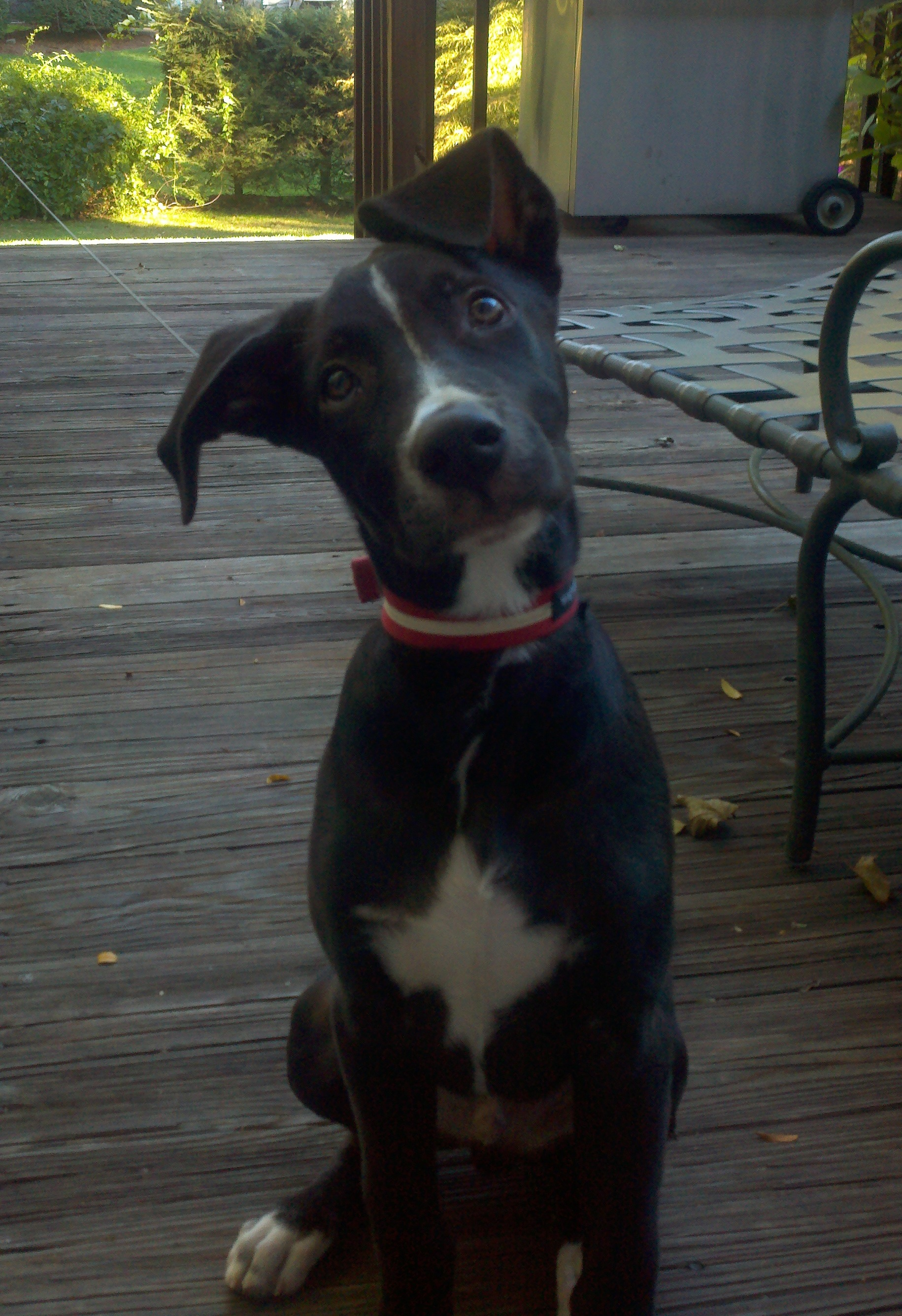
- Black potcake puppy with white markings and curled ears
- Other names: Turks & Caicos Potcake, St Lucia Mongrel, Grenada Pothound, Guyana Rice Eater
- Common nicknames: Potcake, pothound
- Origin: The Bahamas; Puerto Rico; Jamaica; Curacao; Bermuda; Dominican Republic; Haiti
- Breed status: Not recognized as a breed by any major kennel club.
Traits
- Height: Approx. 24 inches (61 cm)
- Weight: 30–70 pounds (14–32 kg)
- Coat: Smooth, short coat, little or no undercoat
- Color: Brown, black, white, red, cream, yellow, particolour
- Notes: The Bahamas Kennel Club: listed separately from the mixed-breed dog under Group 9 – Non-Registered

The potcake dog or American Village Dog is a mixed-breed dog type found on several Caribbean islands. Its name comes from a traditional local dish of seasoned rice and pigeon peas, from which the overcooked rice that sticks to the bottom of the cooking pot (forming the 'pot cake') is commonly mixed with other leftovers and fed to the dogs. Although appearance varies, potcakes generally have smooth coats, cocked ears, and long faces.

== History ==
Dogs on various Caribbean islands share a common ancestry; many residents of Turks and Caicos were originally from nearby islands and took their dogs with them. Three types may have contributed to development: dogs the Arawak brought with them to the Bahamas; terriers protecting supplies from rodents on ships that arrived in Eleuthera, New Providence, and the Abaco Islands; and dogs from North Carolina that arrived with Loyalists during the American Revolutionary War period. It is also likely that the early Spanish settlers may have introduced their own dogs. As these could have included fighting dogs, the Arawak dogs may have been exterminated. In addition, many breeds were imported in the 20th century which interbred with the local dogs, making the mix of breeds in the potcake dynamic. DNA studies have shown no residue of early dog DNA in today's potcakes. Any such remaining DNA has become inconsequential due to the constant imports of dogs with the arrival of colonizers.

The type's name is derived from the term "potcake", which refers to the congealed rice mixture at the bottom of the family cooking pot that Bahamians have traditionally fed dogs In Nassau alone, there are an estimated 5,000 to 8,000 stray potcakes. In the late 1970s, The Bahamas named the type the "Royal Bahamian Potcake". As of February 2011, the Bahamas Kennel Club lists it separately from the mixed-breed dog within Group 9 – Non-Registered.

== Description ==
=== Appearance ===
Although described as having a "shepherd-mix" look, the potcake dog's appearance varies by island. It may resemble a typical pariah dog or have hound, mastiff, spaniel, terrier, or retriever characteristics. The type typically has pointed and cocked ears, a long face, and a smooth coat without undercoat, or less commonly, a "shaggy" or rough coat. As a result of their mixed heritage, potcakes vary widely in terms of color, with many being brown, white, black, and far more with mixed coats. On average, a potcake dog will stand approximately 24 inches (61 cm) at the withers. Healthy dogs typically weigh from 45 to 50 pounds (20 to 23 kg), while strays may weigh only 25 pounds (11 kg).

Variations in potcake dog colouration
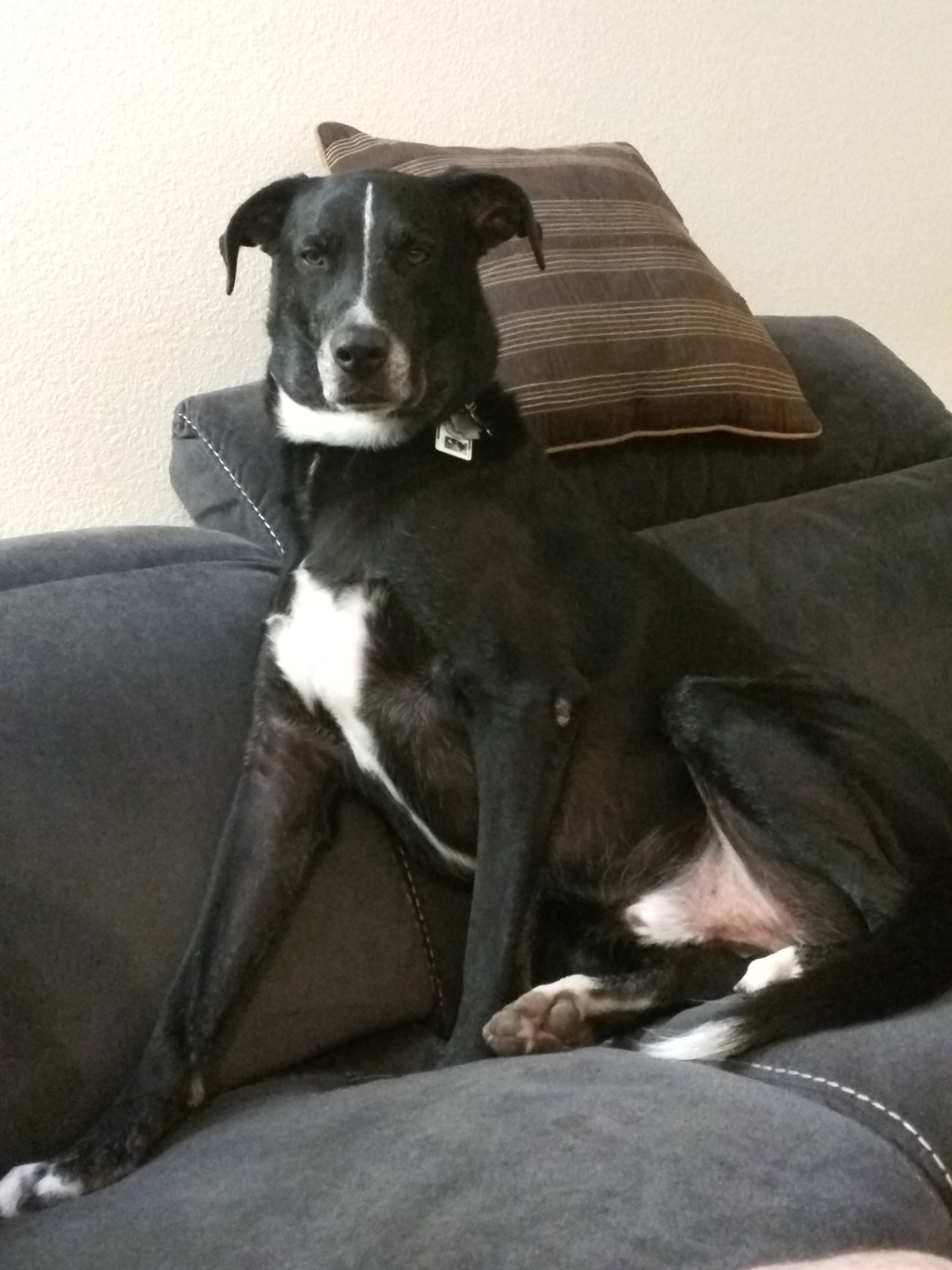
Black and white adult potcake dog from Turks & Caicos (Wyatt)

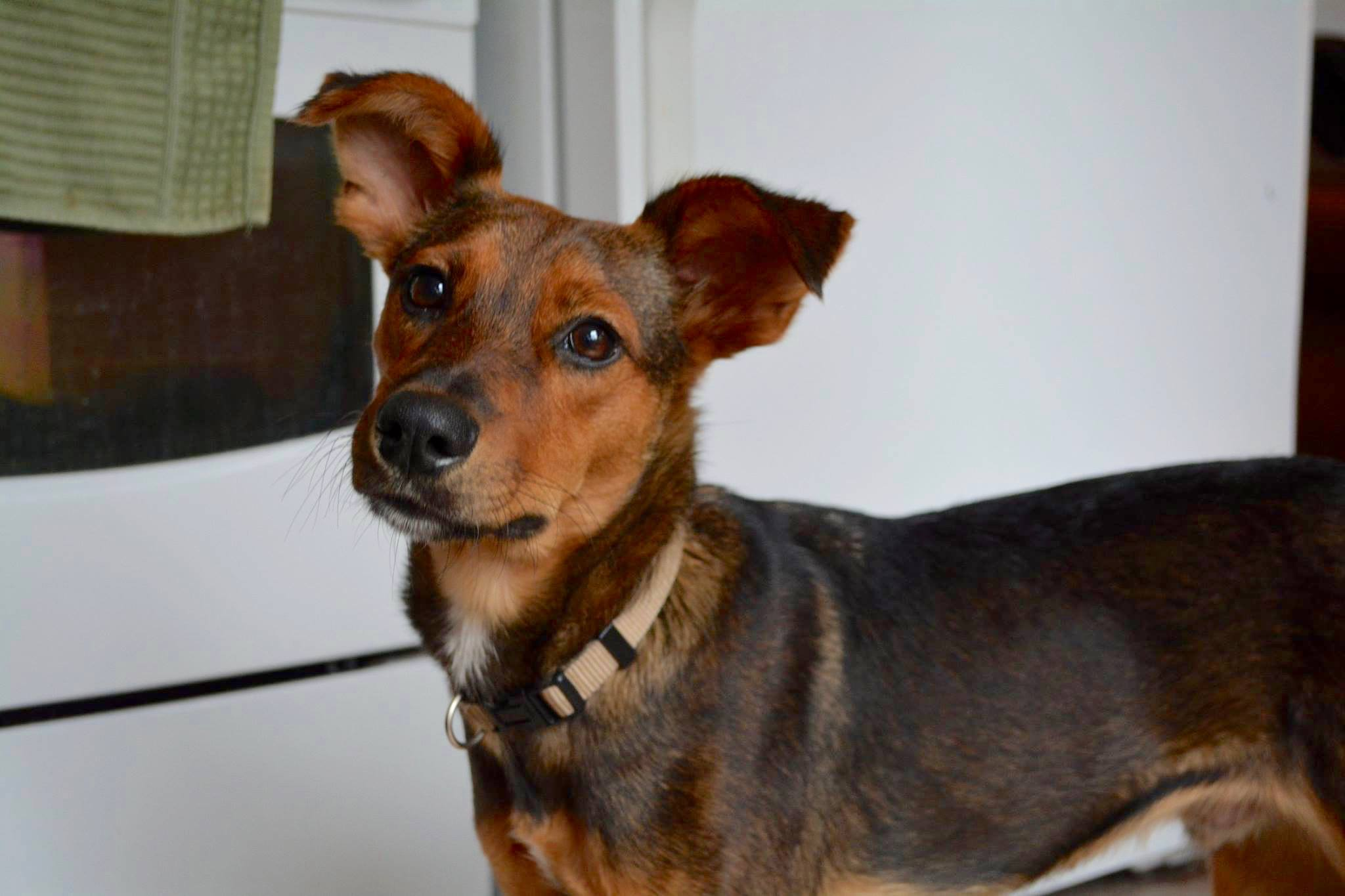
Mixed russet colour, Union Island, 6 months old

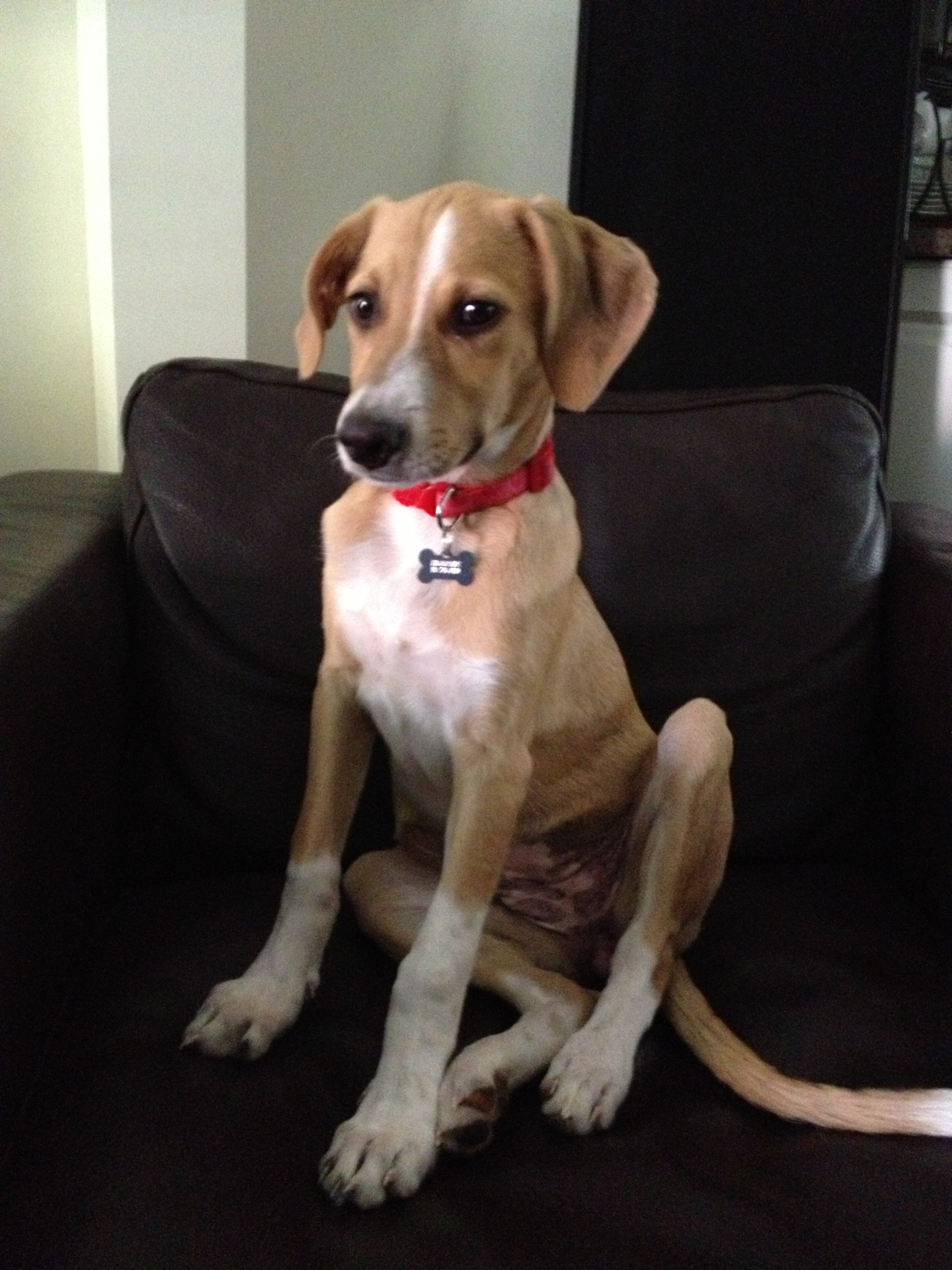
Potcake puppy from Providenciales, Turks and Caicos Islands, 4 months old

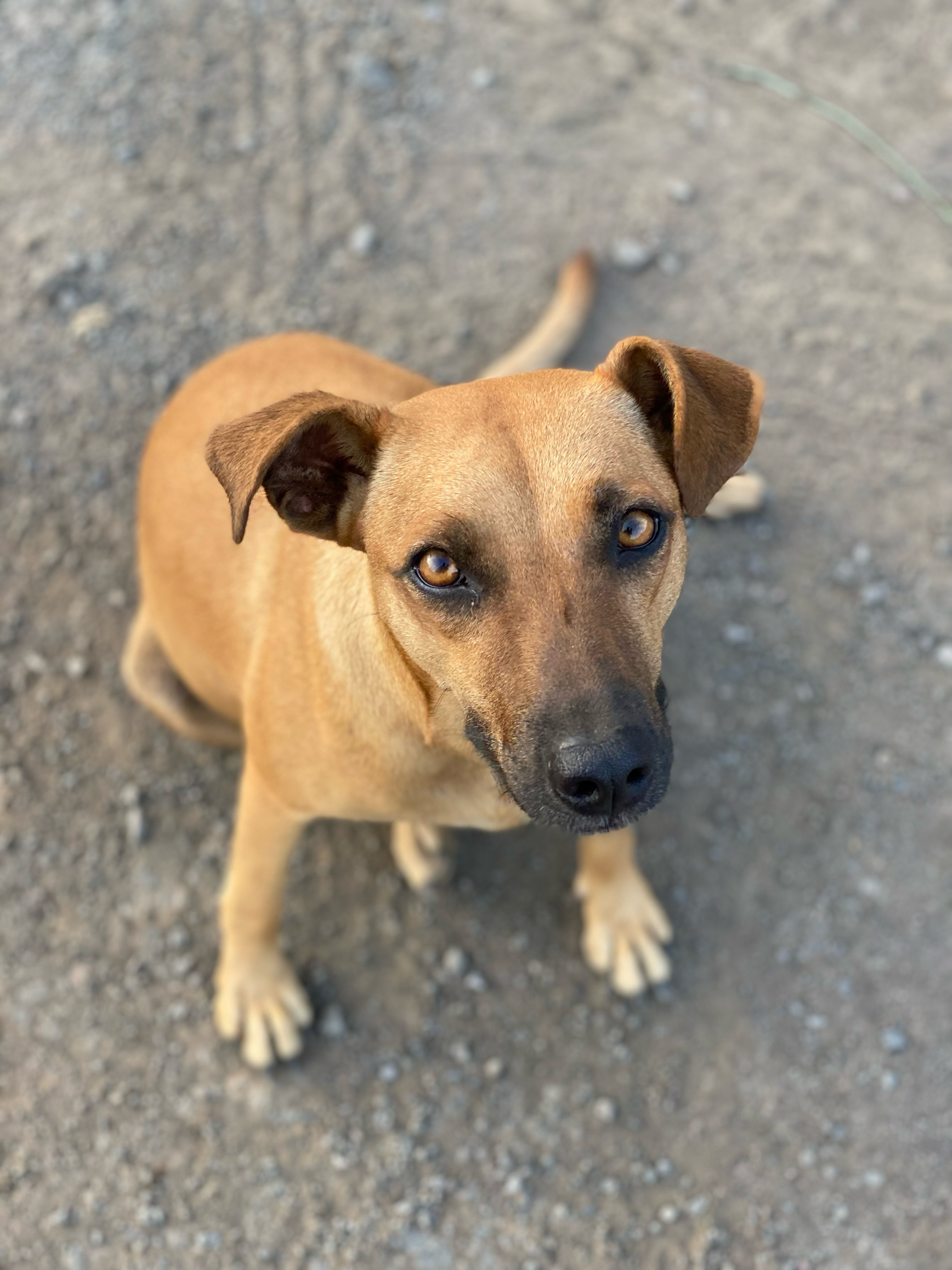
Shakey, a 2-year-old pothound from Grenada, spayed by St. George's University School of Veterinary Medicine students

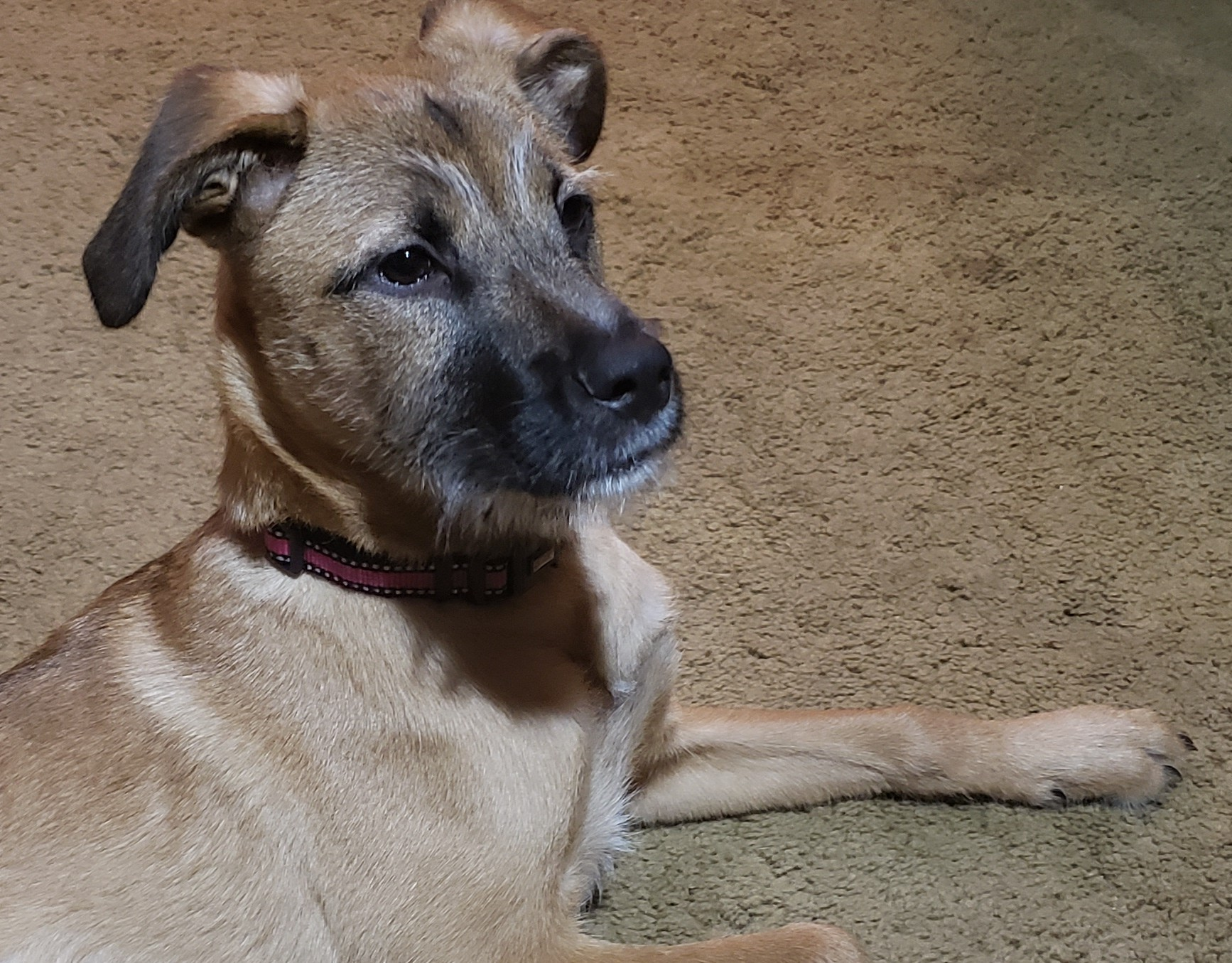
Mallory, Royal Bahamian Potcake dog, 5 months old, rescued after Hurricane Dorian 2019

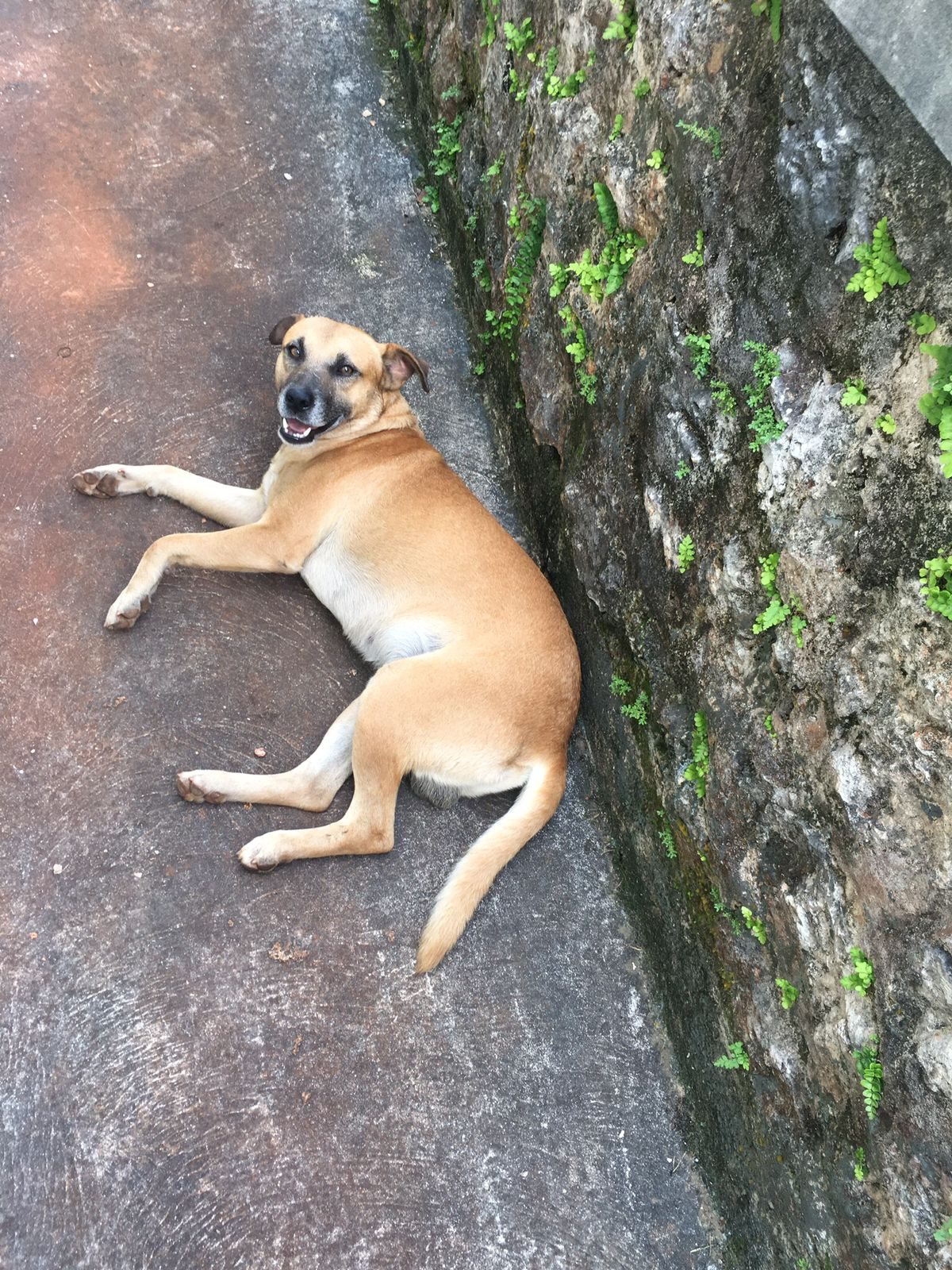
Castro, Royal Caribbean Terrier, 2 years old, living in Jamaica, Manchester parish

=== Behavior ===
According to Jane Parker-Rauw, potcake dogs are intelligent, loyal, calm, and resilient. Unlike many dog breeds, potcakes are able to eat many foods that would be upsetting to most dogs. Their stomachs are incredibly hardy. However, they tend to wander if not properly confined or supervised.

== Overpopulation and rescue efforts ==
The number of stray potcake dogs on the Turks and Caicos Islands has apparently increased, despite spay-and-neuter programmes designed to minimise their numbers. Because the territory is dependent on tourism, officials consider the dogs nuisances, and police have shot and poisoned them. Strays have a median age of three years. In the Bahamas, misconceptions about spaying and neutering dissuade residents from altering their pets. According to The Bahamas Advocates for Animal Rights group, there are 11,000 unowned dogs in New Providence. Forty-five percent of tourists report seeing roaming dogs, though two percent state they were "scared" by their presence.

Local organizations adopt out stray potcake dogs to alleviate the overpopulation problem. In 2005, Turks and Caicos-based rescue organization Potcake Place became a registered charity. They run a puppy socialization program in which tourists take available potcakes on walks. Puppies are vaccinated and sent on airlifts to adopters worldwide. Additionally, several no-kill US shelters and nonprofit animal rescues accept potcake puppies. The Humane Society of Grand Bahama, located in Freeport, ships them to Florida on ferries.

The canine charity OutPaws airlifted 1,001 potcakes from the Caribbean to Denver, Colorado, in 2013, and placed them all for adoption to Colorado families. The 1001st potcake wandered into camp shortly before the take-off of the plane, and was included in the group.

Additional rescue programs exist in Puerto Rico (the Sato Project) and Saint Croix.

== Notable dogs ==
A potcake dog named Amigo is the mascot of the Humane Society of Grand Bahama and the BEKIND Campaign, a collaboration with the HSUS to bring greater attention to animal welfare issues. He was also an Ambassador of Hope for homeless animals until his death due to cancer in 2007. Amigo has appeared on MSNBC, Fox News, and CNN, and received the Ambassador of Goodwill and Hollywood Life Breakthrough of the Year 2007 awards. In 2009, he was one of four potcake dogs honoured in a series of commemorative stamps.
