= Black Mouth Cur =

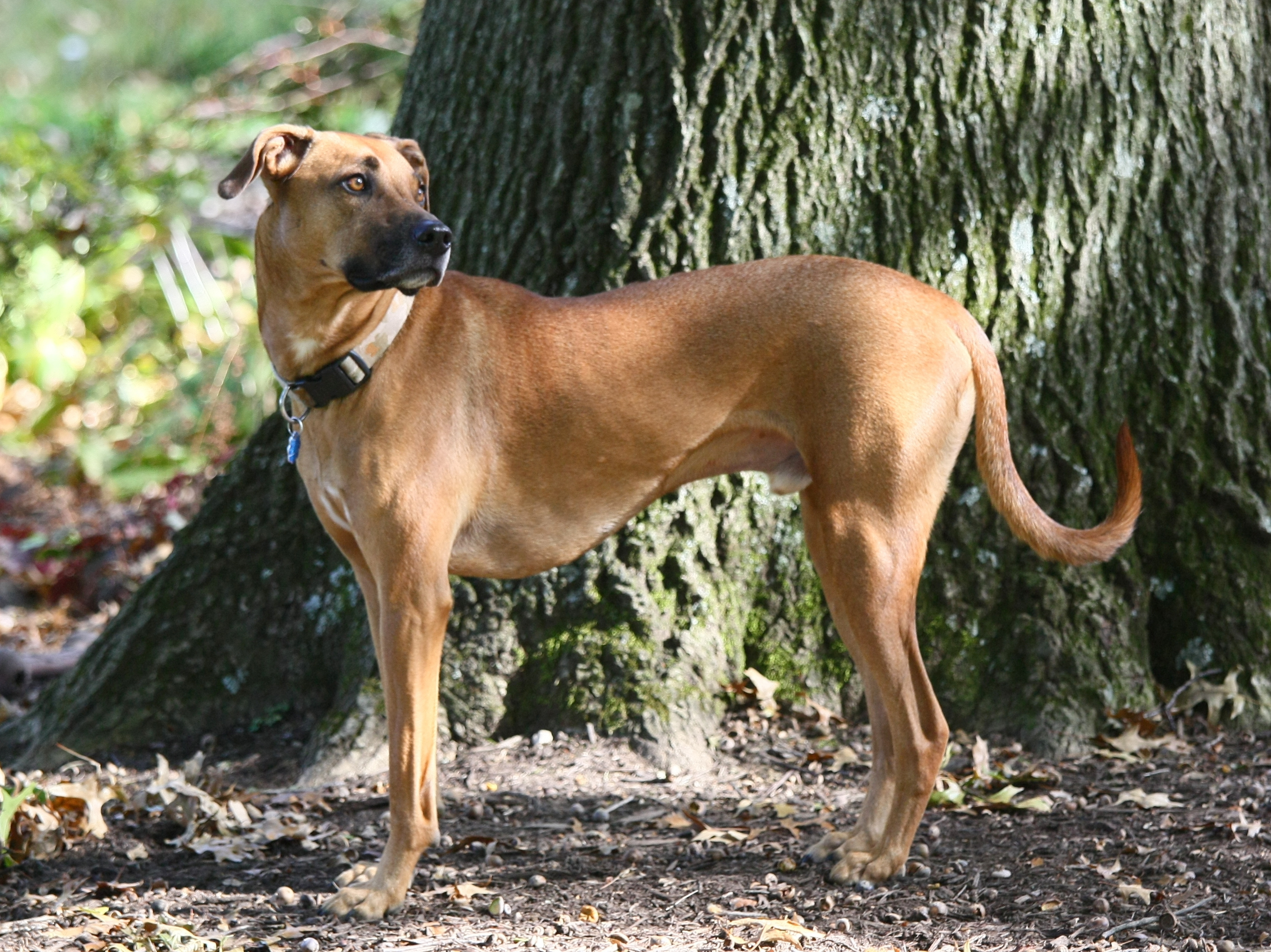
- Other names: Southern Black Mouth Cur; Southern Cur; Vermont Cur; Vermont Black Mouth Cur; Yellow Black Mouth Cur
- Origin: United States
Traits
- Height: 16–25 in (41–64 cm)
Weight	Males	Minimum 40 lb (18 kg)
	Females	Minimum 35 lb (16 kg)
- Coat: Short
- Color: Yellow, fawn, brown, brindle or black with a black muzzle
Kennel club standards
- United Kennel Club: standard

The Black Mouth Cur, also known as the Southern Cur, Southern Black Mouth Cur, and the Yellow Black Mouth Cur, is a medium- to large-sized American breed of dog of cur type. It originated in the south of the country, and is a popular hunting companion, used to hunt a large variety of game.

== History ==
The origins of the Black Mouth Cur are in the Southern United States, where it is known by a number of names including the Southern Cur, Southern Black Mouth Cur, and the Yellow Black Mouth Cur. There are a number of conjectures about its ancestry, of which the most common is that it descends from dogs – among them some Belgian Malinois – brought to southern Mississippi by European settlers. In this environment these dogs were bred into their current form as a popular cur-type hunting dog, and from Mississippi they spread to the mountains of Kentucky, Missouri, North Carolina and Tennessee, and eventually into the Big Thicket region of Southeast Texas. It is claimed the title character in Fred Gipson's novel Old Yeller was a Black Mouth Cur. In 1987 a breed club, the Southern Black Mouth Cur Breeders Association, was formed, and in 1998 the breed was recognised by the United Kennel Club. Northern state dog rescue organizations have been actively transporting rescue dogs of the breed from shelters in the south.

== Florida counterpart ==
The Black Mouth Cur is a known genetic contributor to the common "Florida brown dog", variously known as the Florida Cur, Florida Cow Dog, Florida/Cracker Cur, or Florida Cracker dog. Originating from Florida, this cattle herder has been serving as a defense against wild cats, boars, and bears since the early days of cattle ranching in the region. The Florida Cracker Cur is bred for its working ability. It typically has a muscular body and a well-developed snout. Compared to other curs, it tends to be slightly larger and heavier-boned. Coat colors include brown, white, or black, often with white spots on the feet and chest. It is often confused with the Black Mouth Cur. (Note: “According to history, Spanish explorer De Soto brought the first stock of Florida Cracker Cur with him. He arrived in the Sunshine state in 1539 with cattle. Since the Florida Cracker Cur is an all-around working dog with a sharp nose, it adapted well to the swamplands.”) Most Florida brown dogs have a mix of Labrador Retriever, some Black Mouth Cur, and a small amount of hound in their ancestry. "Nip" and "Tuck" were Florida Cracker Curs gifted to one of the protagonists by the Indians in A Land Remembered, a history of Florida, the best selling novel by Patrick D. Smith.

== Description ==
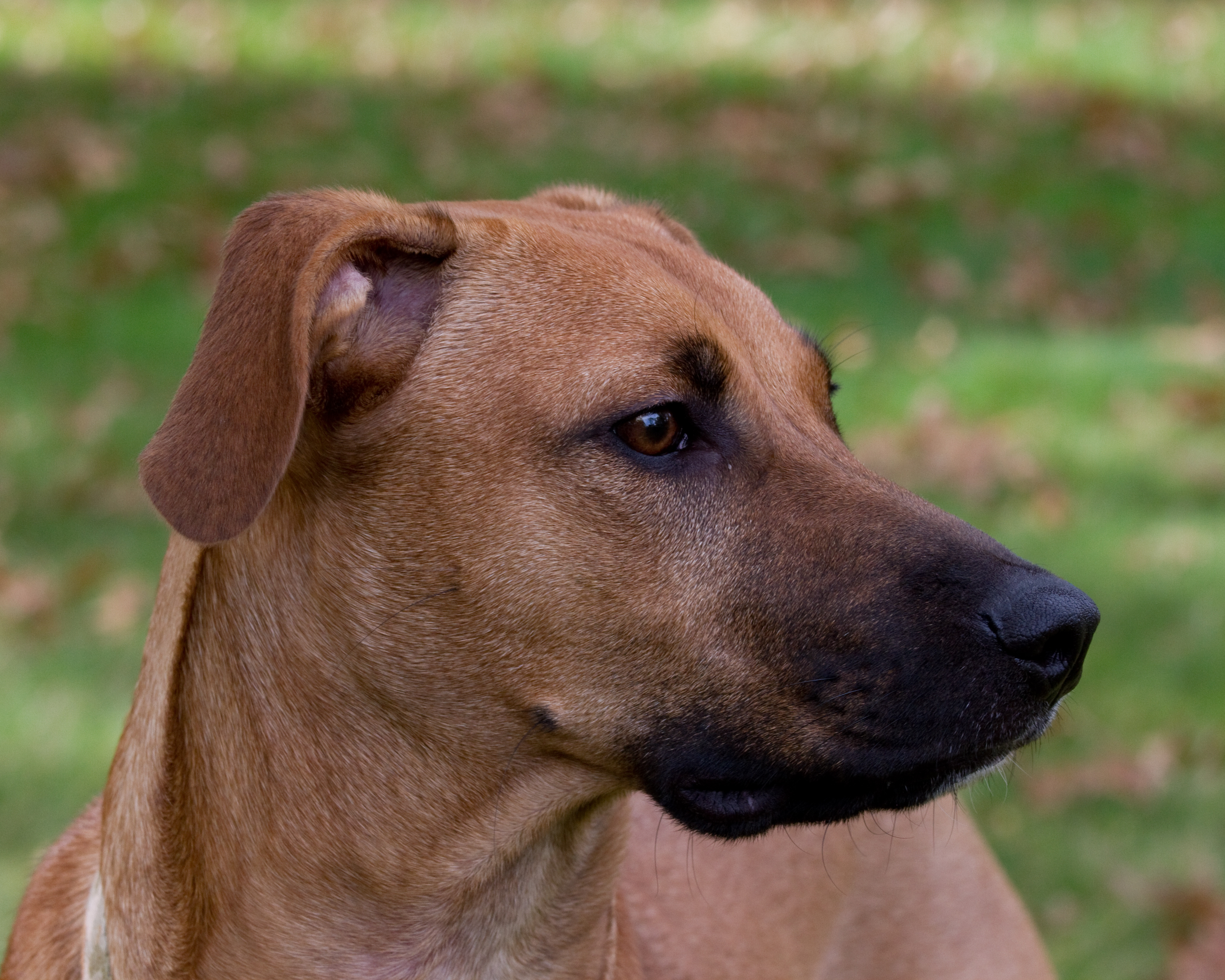
A Black Mouth Cur showing the typical melanistic mask around the muzzle.

=== Appearance ===
The Black Mouth Cur is an athletic, muscular dog of medium to large size. It varies considerably in height, typically standing between 16 and 25 inches (41 and 64 cm), with individual dogs known to reach 28 inches (71 cm); the breed standard mandates a minimum height of 18 inches (46 cm) for dogs and 16 inches for bitches. The dogs usually weigh between 45 and 100 pounds (20 and 45 kg), with the breed standard allowing for significantly lighter animals, with a minimum weight of 40 pounds (18 kg) for dogs and 35 pounds (16 kg) for bitches. The Black Mouth Cur has a short, dense coat; it is usually yellow, fawn or light brown in color, although dark brown, brindle and black individual animals are known. The head is broad and flat, with drooped ears and a powerful, distinctively melanistic black muzzle. The chest is broad and the legs are long, as is the tail – which is not normally docked.

=== Character ===
The Black Mouth Cur is wary of strangers and known to be protective of children, sometimes to the point of objecting to parents disciplining their children. Many are known to respond better to female handlers.

== Uses ==
The Black Mouth Cur is a powerful dog and may be used for herding, hunting, or guarding property.

It is used extensively for hunting throughout the Southern United States, on a broad variety of game including bear, feral pig, raccoon, deer, and squirrel. It has a reputation as a voracious hunter that usually catches and kills game on the ground, although it may also tree and bay game.

== See also ==
- Caramelo (dog)
