= Felipe Becari =

Brazilian politician (born 1987)

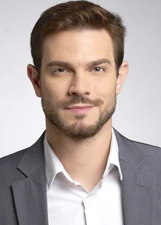
- Becari in 2022

Member of the Chamber of Deputies
- Incumbent
- Assumed office 1 February 2023
- Constituency: São Paulo

Member of the Municipal Chamber of São Paulo
- In office 1 January 2021 – 1 February 2023
- Constituency: At-large

Personal details
- Born: Felipe Becari Comenale; 6 March 1987 (age 39) São Paulo, Brazil
- Party: PODE (since 2026)
- Other political affiliations: PSD (2020–2022); UNIÃO (2022–2026)
- Profession: Police officer

Felipe Becari Comenale (born 6 March 1987) is a Brazilian politician serving as a member of the Chamber of Deputies since 2023. From 2023 to 2024, he served as secretary of sports of São Paulo.
