= Free-ranging dog =

Dog not confined to a yard or house

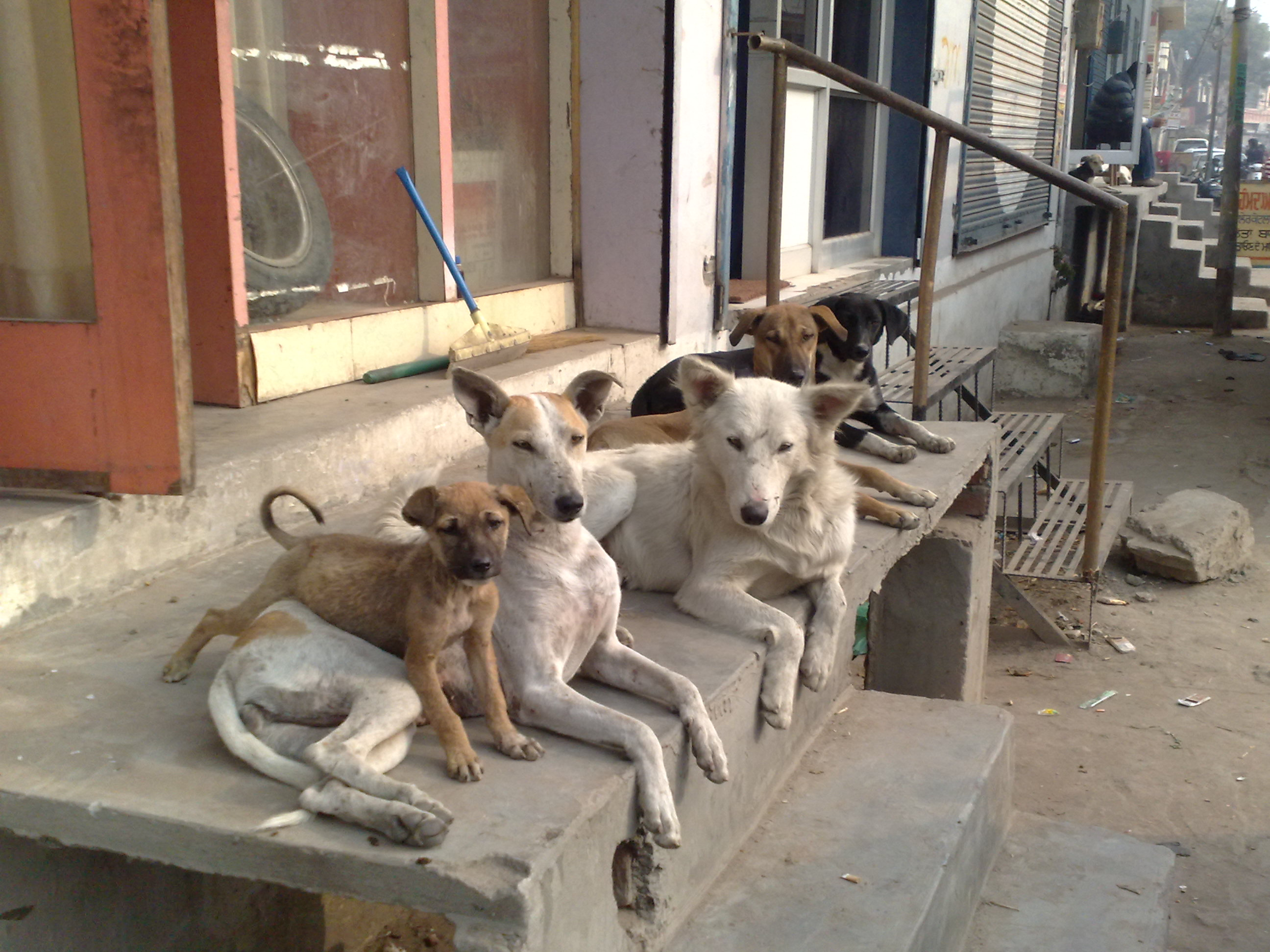
A group of street dogs in India whose health is being checked by volunteers.

A free-ranging dog is a dog that is not confined to a yard or house. Free-ranging dogs include street dogs, village dogs, stray dogs, feral dogs, etc., and may be owned or unowned. The global dog population is estimated to be 700–900 million, of which approximately 75% are classified as free-ranging.

Free-ranging dogs are common in developing countries. It is estimated that there are about 62 million free-ranging dogs in India. In Western countries free-ranging dogs are rare; in Europe they are primarily found in parts of Eastern Europe, and, to a lesser extent, in parts of Southern Europe.

Free-ranging dogs survive by adapting to their environment, including scavenging through uncollected food waste, hunting small animals, consuming carrion and road kill, or being fed by people.

The free-ranging dogs from South Asia, where these animals are very common, are often referred to as pye-dogs. The Indian pariah dog is a landrace of the Indian subcontinent and is often found in the form of street dogs, although some Indian pariah dogs are owned, including by the police.

Various human organizations work to manage free-ranging dogs, citing concerns about the spread of rabies, the animals' welfare, and other issues. These entities include governments, animal rights organizations and other non-governmental organizations, and veterinarians. Some governments have dog-management policies, including trap–neuter–return, the permanent removal of dogs from the streets and their indefinite housing in animal shelters, their (national or international) adoption, or their euthanasia.

== Origin ==
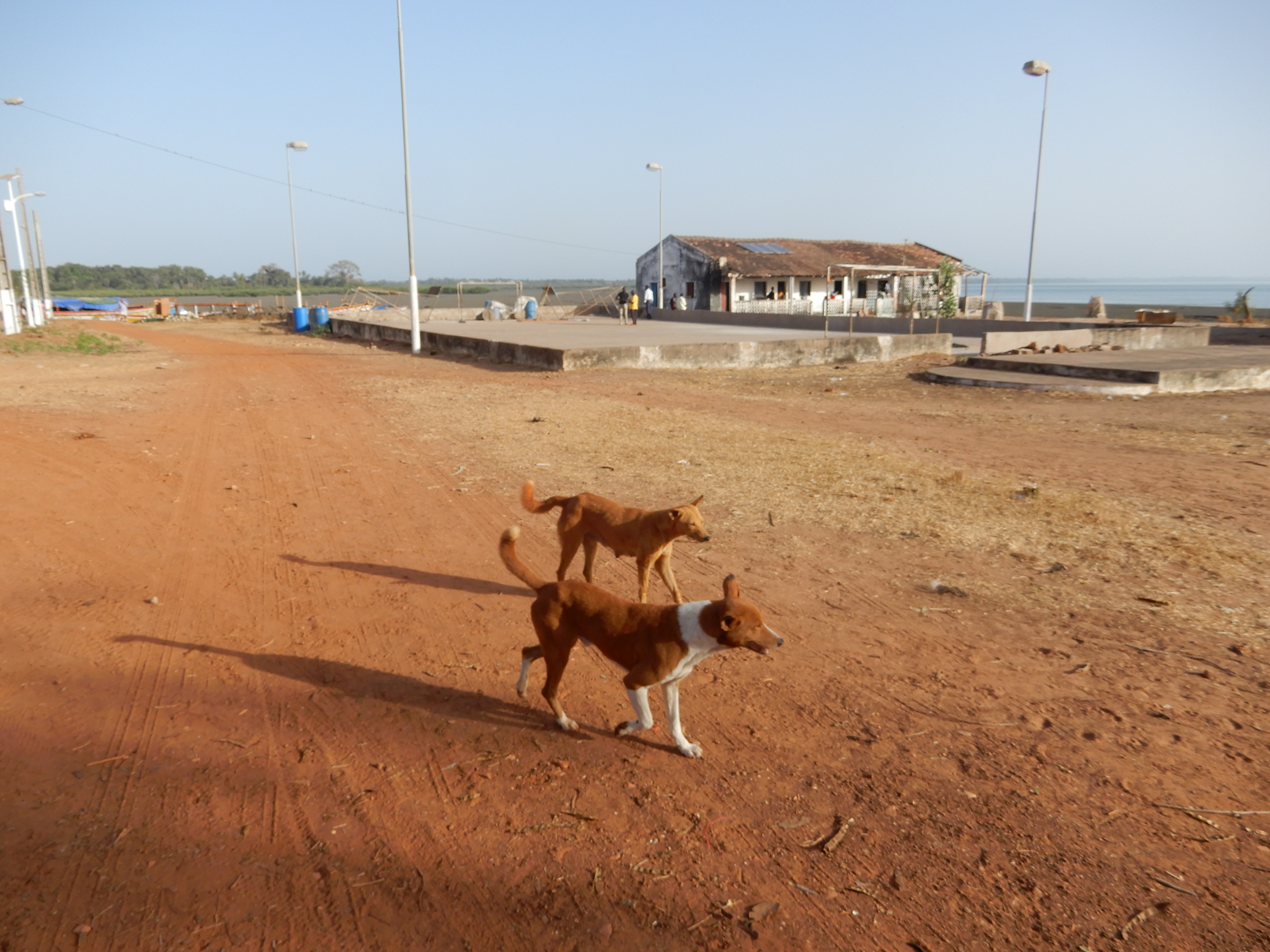
Free-ranging dogs in Guinea-Bissau

Dogs living with humans is a dynamic relationship, with a large proportion of the dog population losing contact with humans at some stage over time. This loss of contact first occurred after domestication and has reoccurred throughout history.

The global dog population is estimated to be around 900 million and rising. Although it is said that the "dog is man's best friend" for the 17–24% of dogs that live as pets in the developed countries, in the developing world pet dogs are uncommon, with there instead being many village, community, or feral dogs. Most of these dogs live out their lives as scavengers and have never been owned by humans, with one study showing their most common response when approached by strangers is to run away (52%) or respond aggressively (11%). Little is known about these dogs, or the dogs in developed countries that are feral, stray, or that are in shelters, as the majority of modern research on dog cognition has focused on pet dogs living in human homes.

== Factors leading to stray dogs ==
Stray dogs are dogs without an owner. While the term stray dog is sometimes used to refer specifically to dogs which have been lost, in a more general sense a stray dog is any unowned free-ranging dog. The animal welfare organization Four Paws defines stray animals as "those animals who are either born on the streets or have become homeless due to abandonment". Several factors lead to the existence of stray dogs. In some cases, the dogs have lived on the streets for many generations. Such dogs are born on the streets, having never been owned, and live in a feral or semi-feral state. Other stray dogs have been previously owned and ended on the streets because they were abandoned by their owners, either at birth (when the owners could not accommodate a litter) or at a later time, especially if the owners faced economic challenges, lifestyle changes, or health issues. Some owners abandon their working dogs if they are dissatisfied with their performance. Dogs can also end up as strays in cases of natural disasters, armed conflicts or other calamities.

== Categories of dogs ==
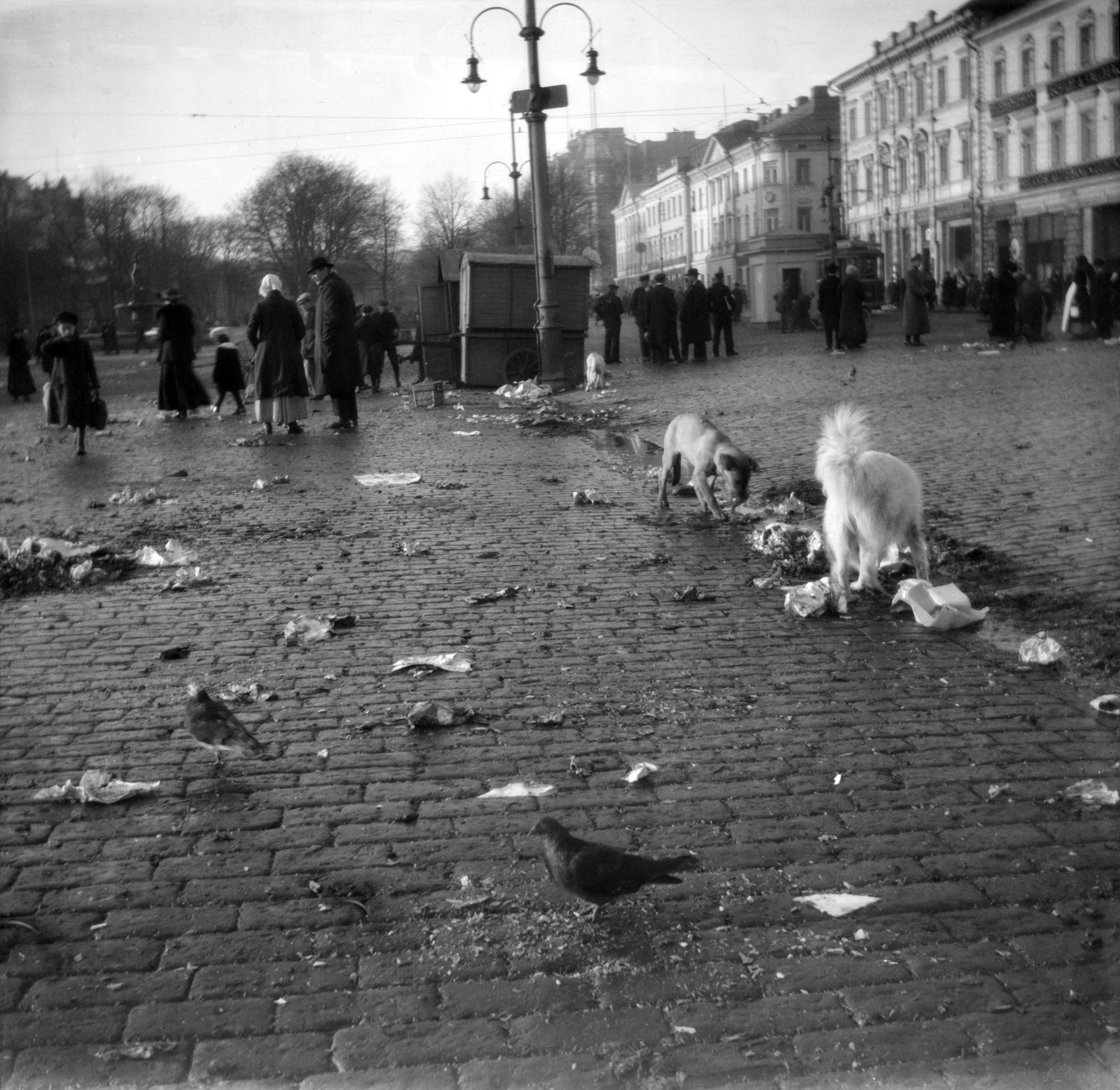
Stray dogs in Helsinki, Finland, in 1917. Historically, stray dogs have existed in almost all places where there were dogs. While today in some Western countries stray dogs are no longer present, stray dogs continue to exist in most parts of the world.

There is confusion with the terms used to categorize dogs. Dogs can be classed by whether they possess an owner or a community of owners, how freely they can move around, and any genetic differences they have from other dog populations due to long-term separation.

=== Family dogs ===
Also known as "owned dogs". They have an identifiable human associate, are commonly socialized, and are not allowed to roam. They are restricted to particular outdoor or indoor areas. They have little impact on wildlife unless going with humans into natural areas.

Domestic dogs are all dog breeds (other than dingoes) selectively bred, kept and fed by humans. They can be pets, guard dogs, livestock guardian dogs or working dogs. Domestic dogs may also behave like wild dogs if they are not adequately controlled or are free roaming.

=== Free-ranging owned dogs ===
A free-ranging dog is a dog that is not confined to a yard or house. Free-ranging owned dogs are cared for by one owner or a community of owners, and are able to roam freely. This includes "village dogs", which live in rural areas and human habitations. These are not confined. However, they rarely leave the village vicinity. This also includes "rural free-ranging dogs", which also live in rural areas and human habitations. These are owned or are associated with homes, and they are not confined. These include farm and pastoral dogs that range over particular areas.

=== Free-ranging unowned dogs ===
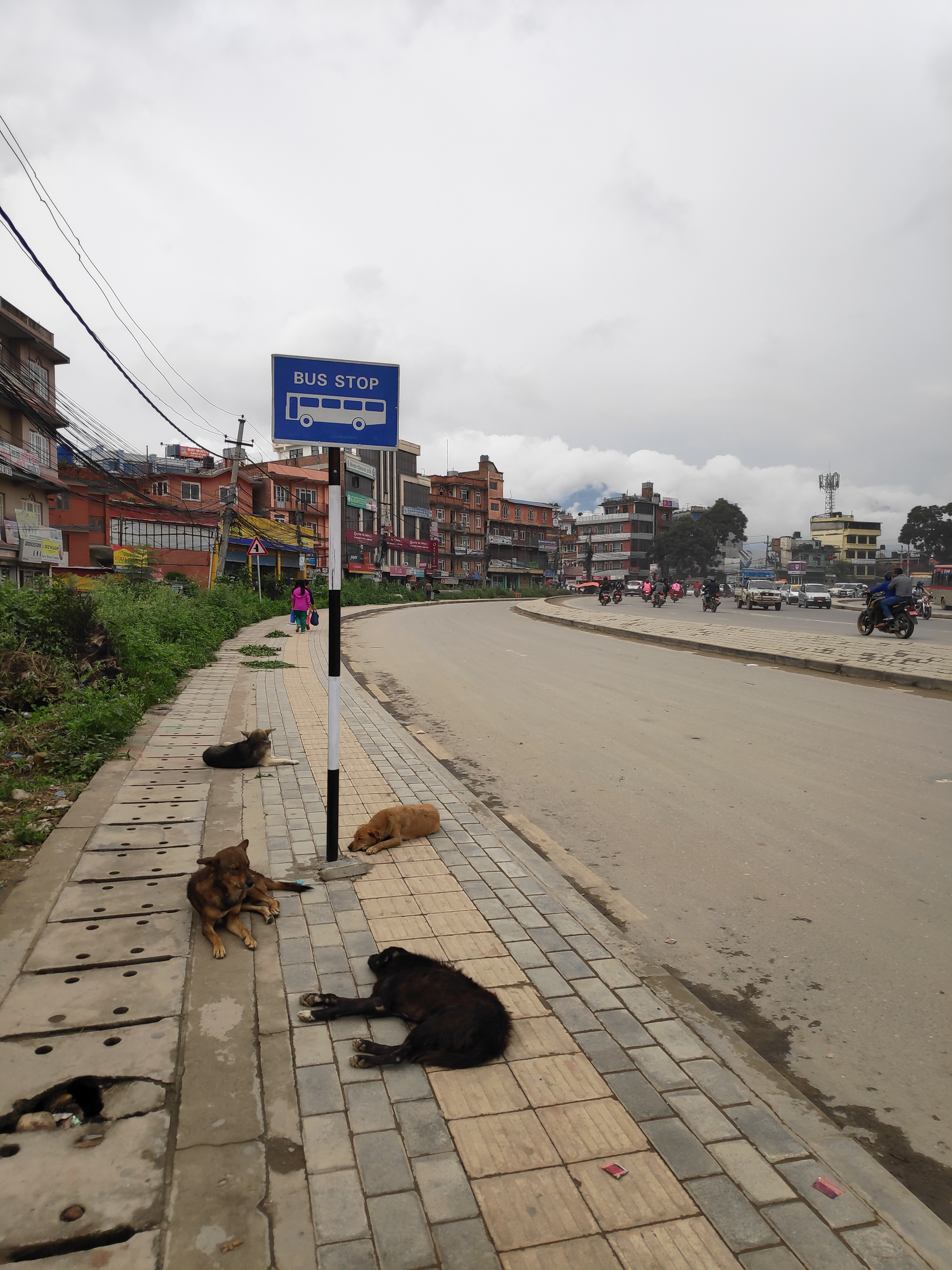
Street dogs in Nepal

Free-ranging unowned dogs are stray dogs. They get their food and shelter from human environments, but they have not been socialized and so they avoid humans as much as possible. Free-ranging unowned dogs include "street dogs", which live in cities and urban areas. These have no owner but are commensals, subsisting on leftover food from humans, garbage, or other dogs' food as their primary food sources. Free-ranging unowned dogs also include feral dogs.

=== Feral dogs ===
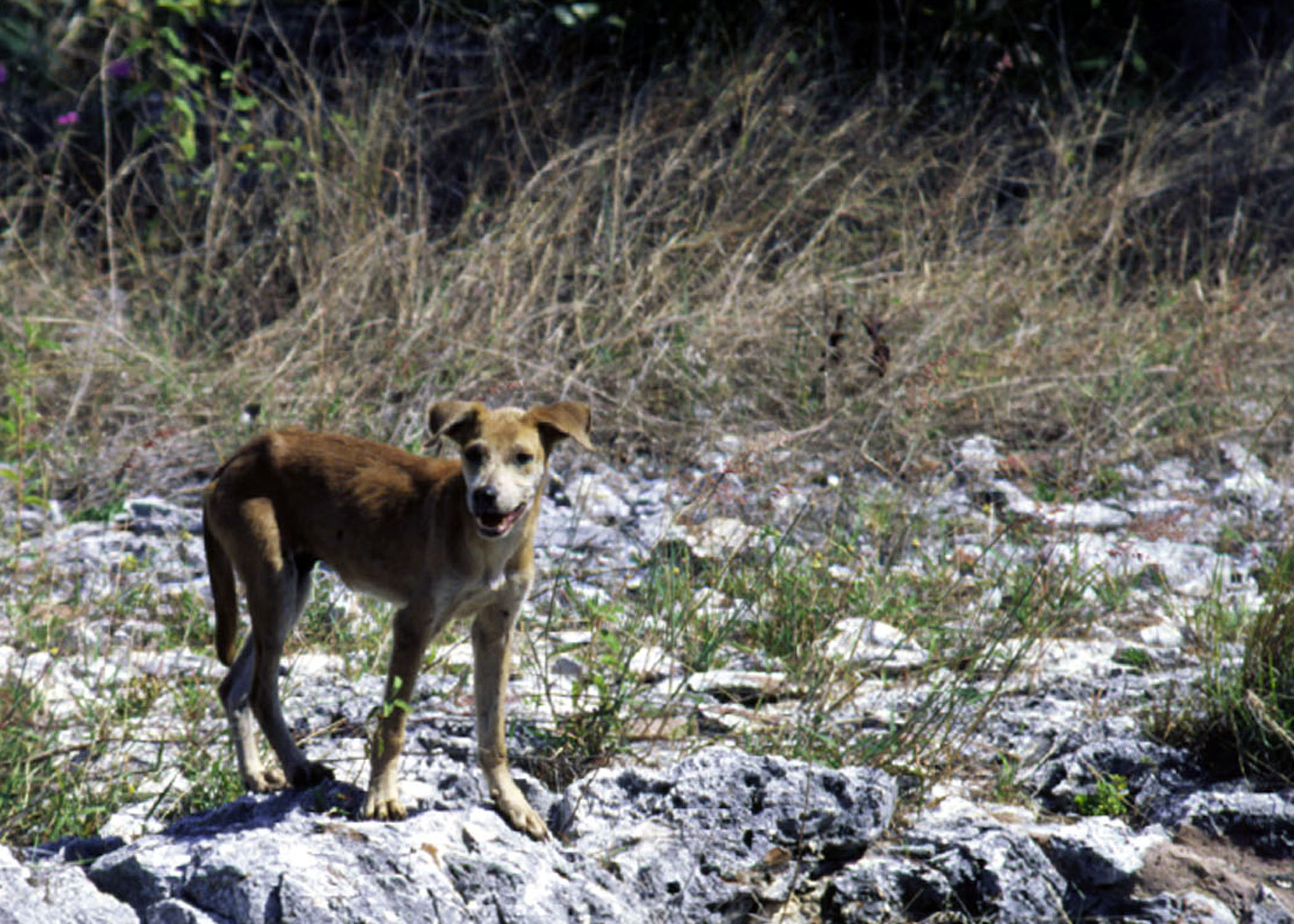
A feral dog on Navassa Island in the Caribbean.

The term "feral" can be used to describe those animals that have been through the process of domestication but have returned to a wild state. "Domesticated" and "socialized" (tamed) do not mean the same thing, as it is possible for an individual animal of a domesticated species to be feral and not tame, and it is possible for an individual animal of a wild species to be socialized to live with humans.

Feral dogs differ from other dogs because they did not have close human contact early in their lives (socialization). Feral dogs live in a wild state with no food and shelter intentionally provided by humans and show a continuous and strong avoidance of direct human contact. The distinction between feral, stray, and free-ranging dogs is sometimes a matter of degree, and a dog may shift its status throughout its life. In some unlikely but observed cases, a feral dog that was not born wild but lived with a feral group can become rehabilitated to a domestic dog with an owner. A dog can become a stray when it escapes human control, by abandonment or being born to a stray mother. A stray dog can become feral when it is forced out of the human environment or when it is co-opted or socially accepted by a nearby feral group. Feralization occurs by the development of a fear response to humans. Feral dogs are not reproductively self-sustaining, suffer from high rates of juvenile mortality, and depend indirectly on humans for their food, their space, and the supply of co-optable individuals.

== "Wild" dogs ==
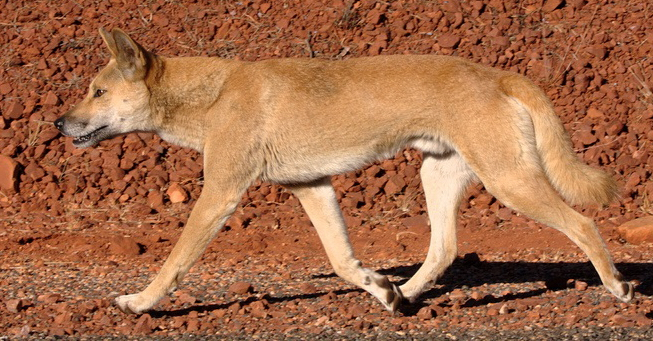
The Australian dingo is debated as being a "wild dog".

The existence of "wild dogs" is debated. Some authors propose that this term applies to the Australian dingo and dingo-feral dog hybrids. They believe that these have a history of independence from humans and should no longer be considered as domesticated. Others disagree and propose that the dingo was once domesticated and is now a feral dog.

Queensland Department of Agriculture and Fisheries defines wild dogs as any dogs that are not domesticated, which includes dingoes, feral dogs, and hybrids. Yearling wild dogs frequently disperse more than 100 km (62 mi) from their birthplace.

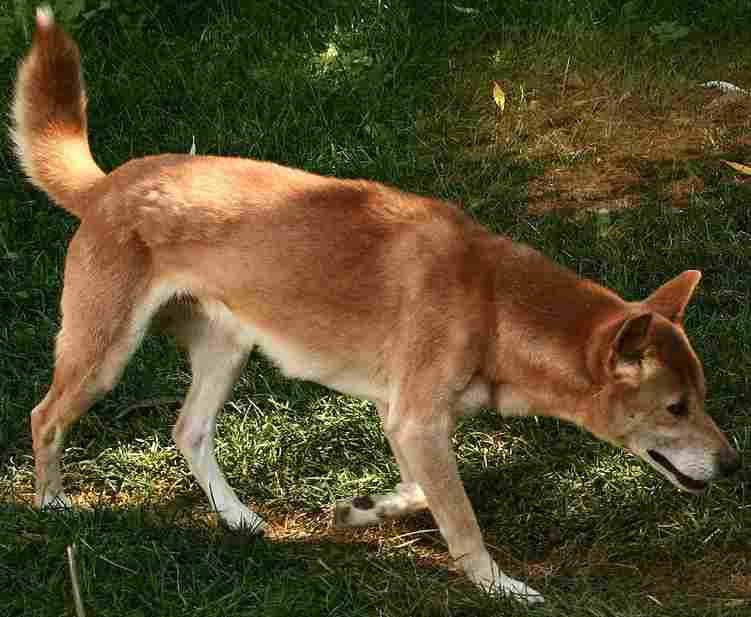
A New Guinea Singing Dog

The first British colonists to arrive in Australia established a settlement at Port Jackson in 1788 and recorded dingoes living there with indigenous Australians. Although the dingo exists in the wild, it associates with humans but has not been selectively bred as have other domesticated animals. The dingo's relationship with indigenous Australians can be described as commensalism, in which two organisms live in close association but without depending on each other for survival. They will hunt and sleep together. The dingo is therefore comfortable enough around humans to associate with them but can still live independently, much like the domestic cat. Any free-ranging unowned dog can be socialized to become an owned dog, as some dingoes do when they join human families.

Another point of view regards domestication as a process that is difficult to define. It regards dogs as being either socialized and able to exist with humans or unsocialized. Some dogs live with their human families but are unsocialized and will treat strangers aggressively and defensively as might a wild wolf. Wild wolves have approached people in remote places, attempting to get them to play and to form companionship.

== Street dog ==
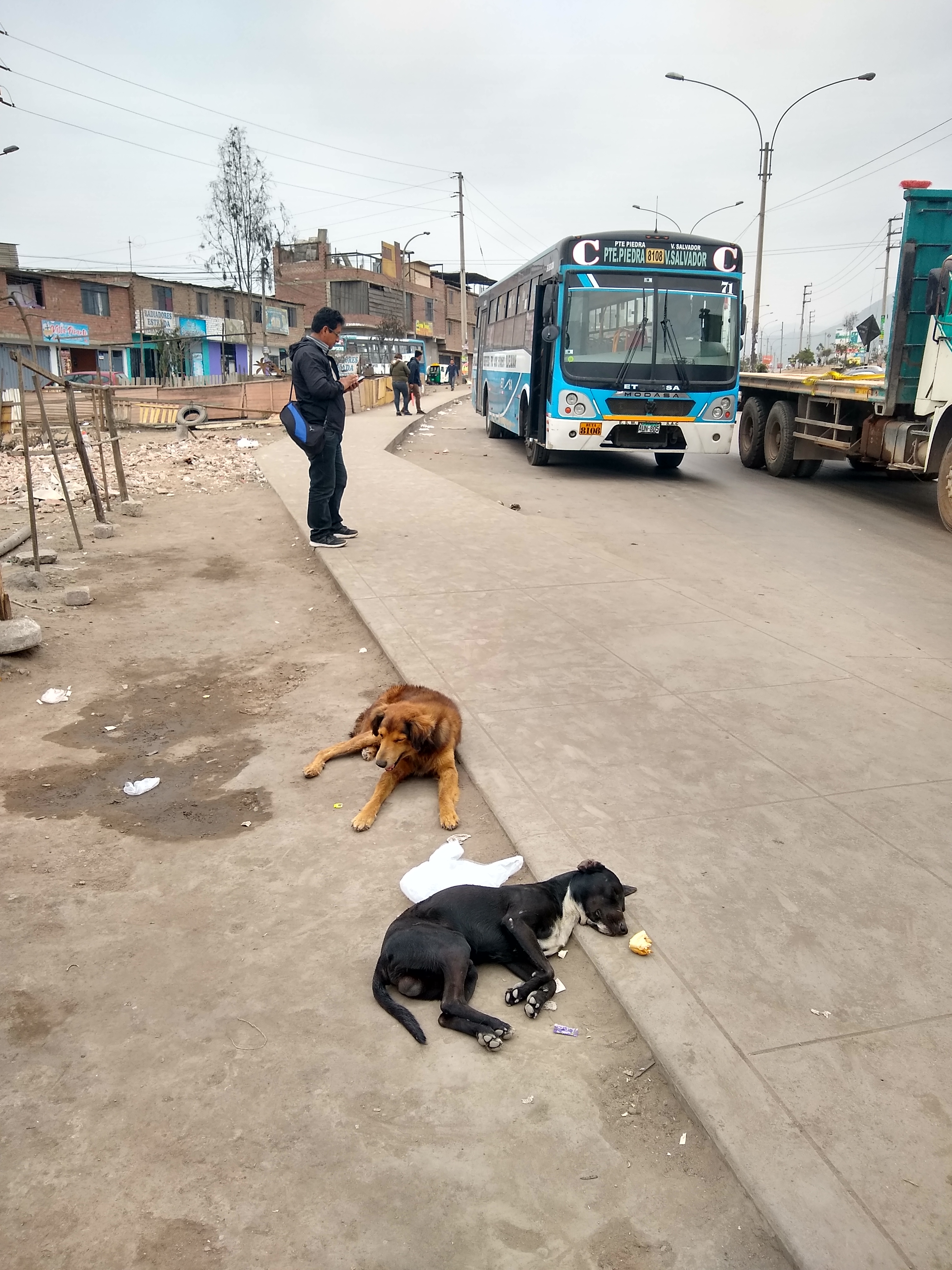
Street dogs in Lima, Peru

Street dogs, known in scientific literature as free-ranging urban dogs, are unconfined dogs that live in cities. They live virtually everywhere cities exist and the local human population allows, especially in the developing world. Street dogs may be former pets that have strayed from or have been abandoned by their owners, or they may be feral animals that have never been owned. Street dogs may be stray purebreds, true mixed-breed dogs, or unbred landraces such as the Indian pariah dog. Street dog overpopulation can cause problems for the societies in which they live, so campaigns to spay and neuter them are sometimes implemented. They tend to differ from rural free-ranging dogs in their skill sets, socialization, and ecological effects.

=== Problems caused by street dogs ===
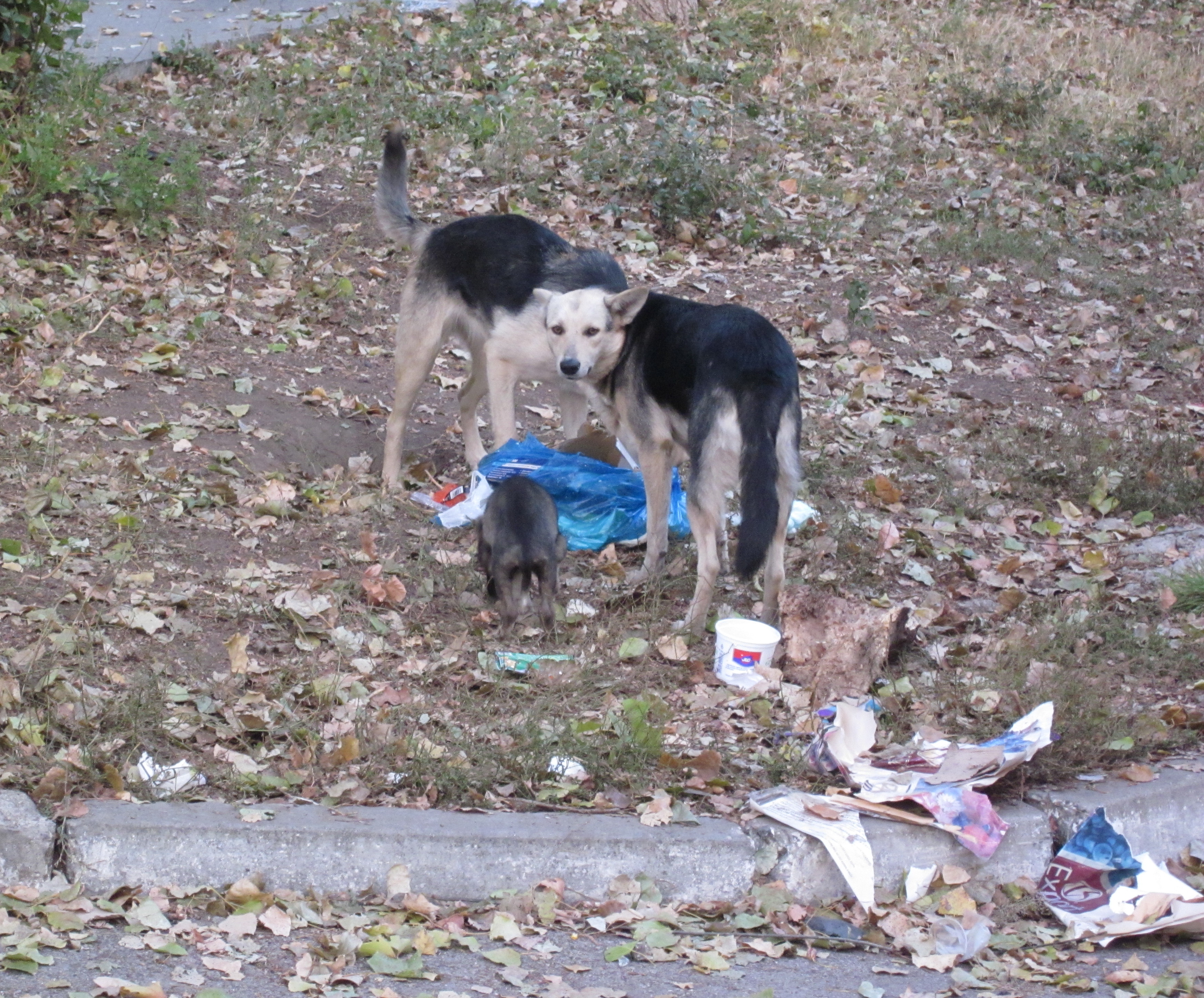
Street dogs in Chișinău, Moldova

==== Bites ====
Street dogs generally avoid conflict with humans to survive. However, dog bites and attacks can occur for various reasons. Dogs might bite because they are scared, startled, feel threatened, or are protecting something valuable like their puppies, food, or toys. Bites can also occur if dogs are unwell due to illness or injury; are playing; or are experiencing hunger, thirst, abuse, or a lack of caretakers. Territorial instincts and predator instincts can also lead to bites. Rabies remains a significant issue in some countries. In India, where it is estimated that there are about 62 million free-ranging dogs, about 17.4 million animal bites occur annually, resulting in 20,565 human rabies deaths. Rabies is endemic in India, with the country accounting for 36% of the world's rabies deaths.

In addition to rabies, dog bites are also associated with other health risks, including Capnocytophaga canimorsus, MRSA, tetanus, Pasteurella Bergeyella zoohelcum, osteomyelitis, septic arthritis, tenosynovitis, giardia and leptospirosis; and, therefore, dog bites require immediate medical attention. After a dog bite, a tetanus vaccine is needed if the person has not been previously adequately vaccinated. Prophylactic antibiotics are also needed for high-risk wounds or people with immune deficiency. Deaths from dog bites are more common in low and middle-income countries than in high-income countries.

==== Quality of life ====
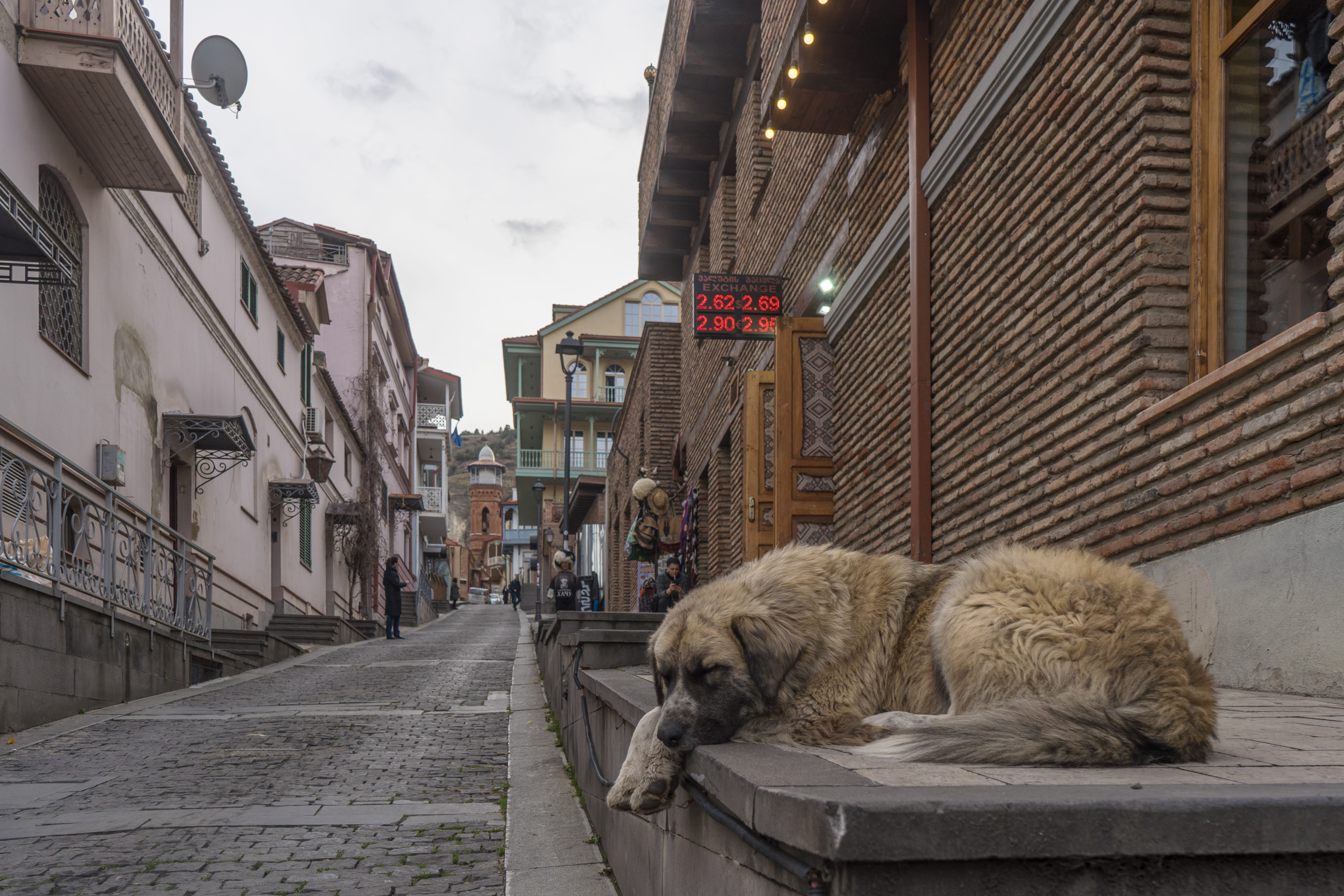
A street dog in Tbilisi, Georgia

Mortality rates of street dogs are very high, especially among puppies, with common causes of death including human activity (whether accidental or deliberate killing), attacks by other animals, malnutrition, and diseases. A study conducted on stray dogs in West Bengal found that only 19% of puppies born on the street survived until reproductive age.

The presence of stray dogs can significantly impact the quality of life for humans in several ways. Barking, howling, and dog fights can disturb people, especially at night. The smell of dog urine, a result of territory marking, can become pungent among un-spayed or neutered dogs, and the presence of feces can lead to sanitation issues and health risks such as toxocariasis. Additionally, the fear of dog bites and attacks can cause anxiety and affect people's mobility and outdoor activities.

Conversely, stray dogs' quality of life is also greatly affected by their interactions with humans. Stray dogs often struggle with food and water scarcity, and they are vulnerable to abuse and neglect. Lack of medical care leads to untreated injuries and diseases. Urban environments can be harsh and stressful, and encounters with humans can result in fear, injuries, and displacement.

=== Skills and adaptations ===
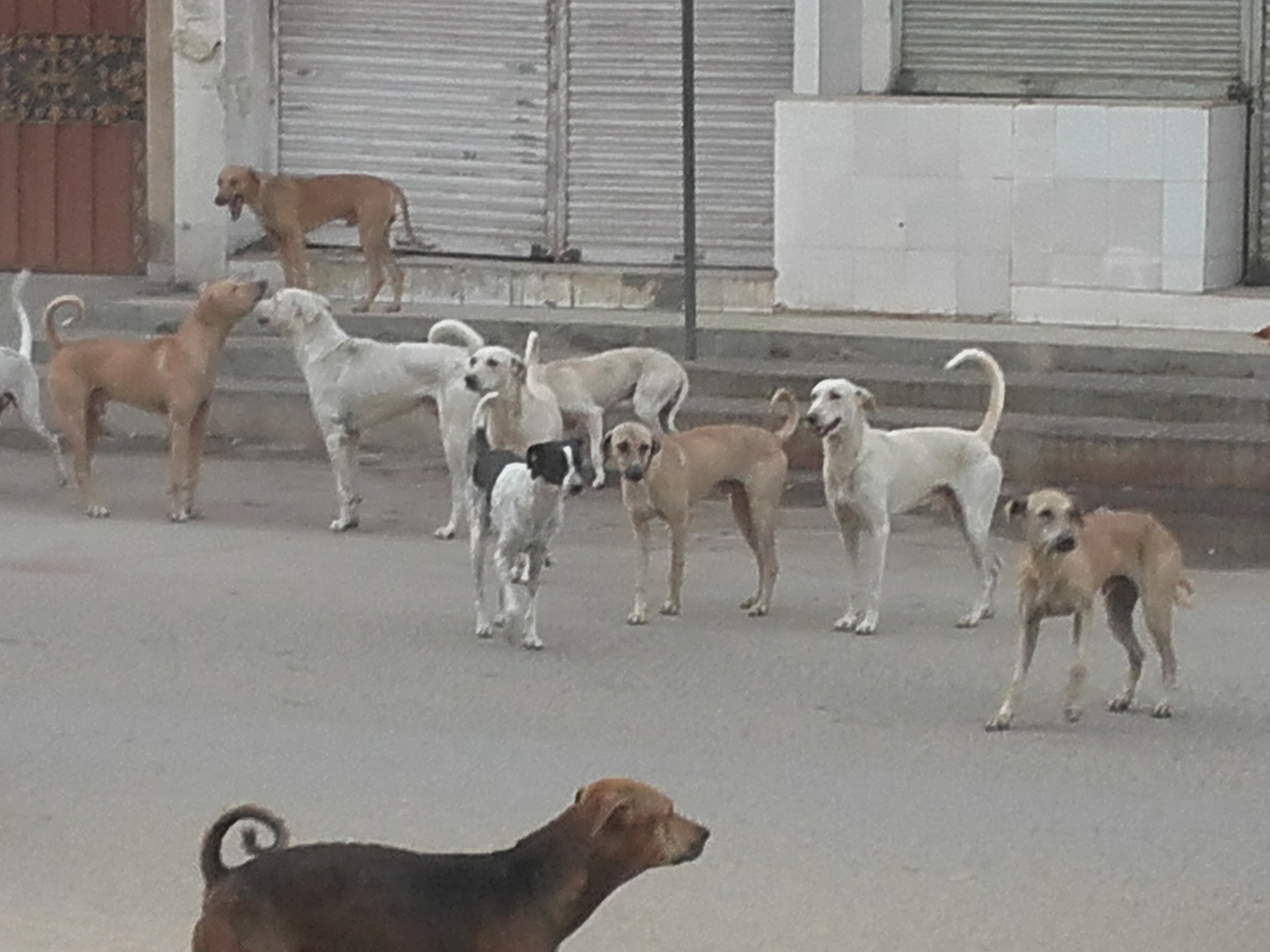
A pack of street dogs in Karachi, Pakistan

Dogs are known to be a highly adaptive and intelligent species. Free-ranging dogs commonly form packs. To survive in modern cities, street dogs must be able to navigate traffic.

Some of the stray dogs in Bucharest, for example, are seen crossing the large streets at pedestrian crosswalks. The dogs have probably noticed that when humans cross streets at such markings, cars tend to stop. The dogs have accustomed themselves to the flow of pedestrian and automobile traffic, sitting patiently with the people at the curb when they are stopped for a red light and then safely crossing with the pedestrians in a group.

In other countries street dogs are said to have been observed using subway and bus services.

== Behaviour ==
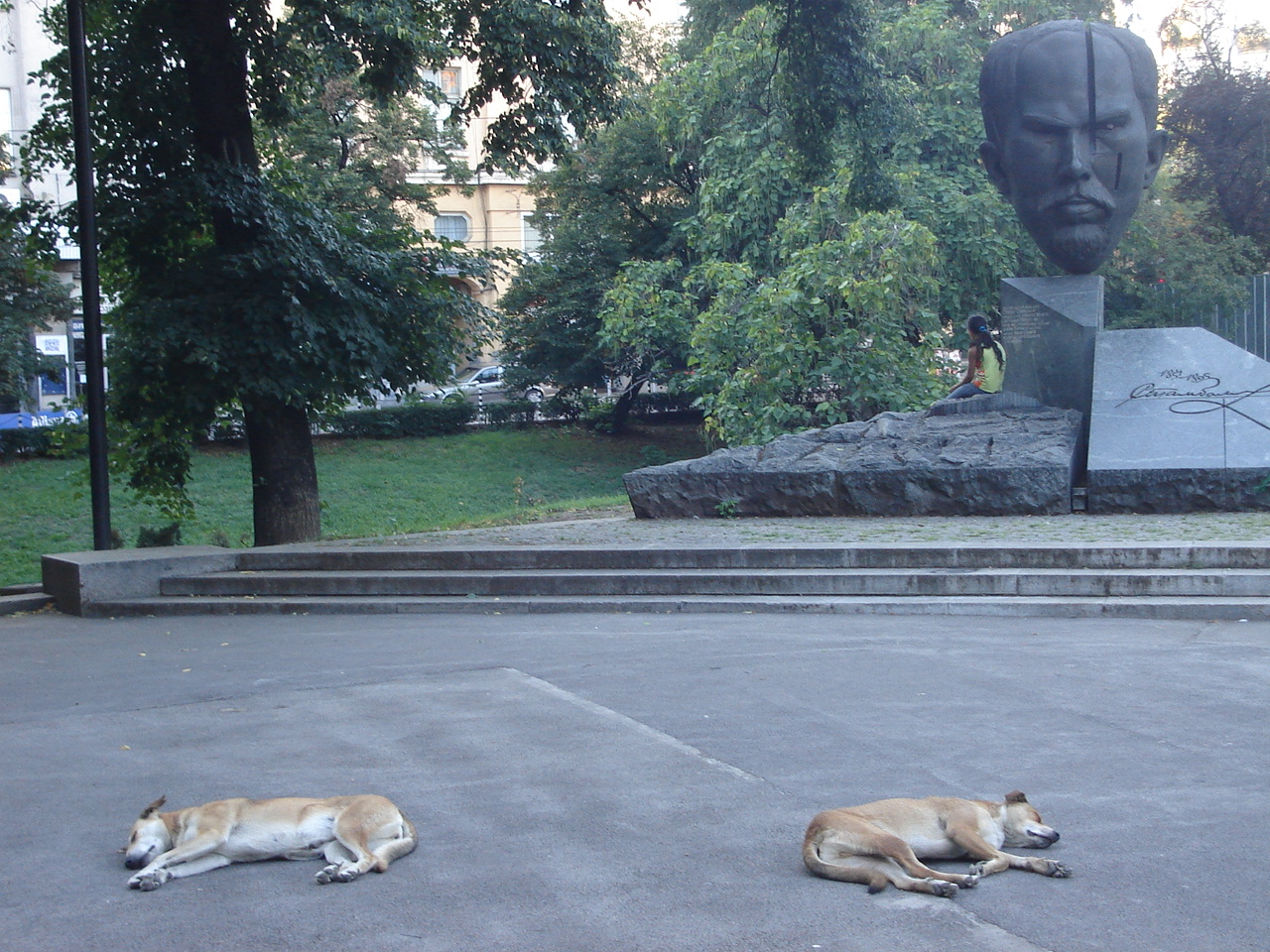
Two stray dogs sleeping during daytime, in Sofia, Bulgaria

Free-ranging dogs tend to be crepuscular animals, and are often inactive during daytime, especially during the heat of the summer. Free-ranging dogs commonly form packs. The dogs rest close to their resource sites in their territory, choosing a place that enables maximum visibility of the surroundings. For sleeping, they often choose locations in the core of the territory, preferring areas with shade. The dogs seek spaces which shelter them from harsh weather, and often rest or sleep under parked cars.

Free-ranging dogs who have been in this state for generations have developed certain traits through natural selection in order to be able to survive in their respective environments.

Wild dogs rest during the day, often not far from water, and their travel routes to and from resting or den sites may be well defined. They are usually timid and do not often stray into urban areas unless they are encouraged. Those with a recent domestic background or regular close contact with people may approach dwellings or people. Wild dogs are attracted to places where they can scavenge food, and deliberately or inadvertently feeding them can make them dependent on humans. Wild dingoes in remote areas live in packs, often of 3–12 animals, with a dominant (alpha) male and female controlling breeding. Packs establish territories which usually do not overlap. Wild dogs, particularly dingoes, visit the edge of their territory regularly. This checking of the boundaries is termed the dog's beat.

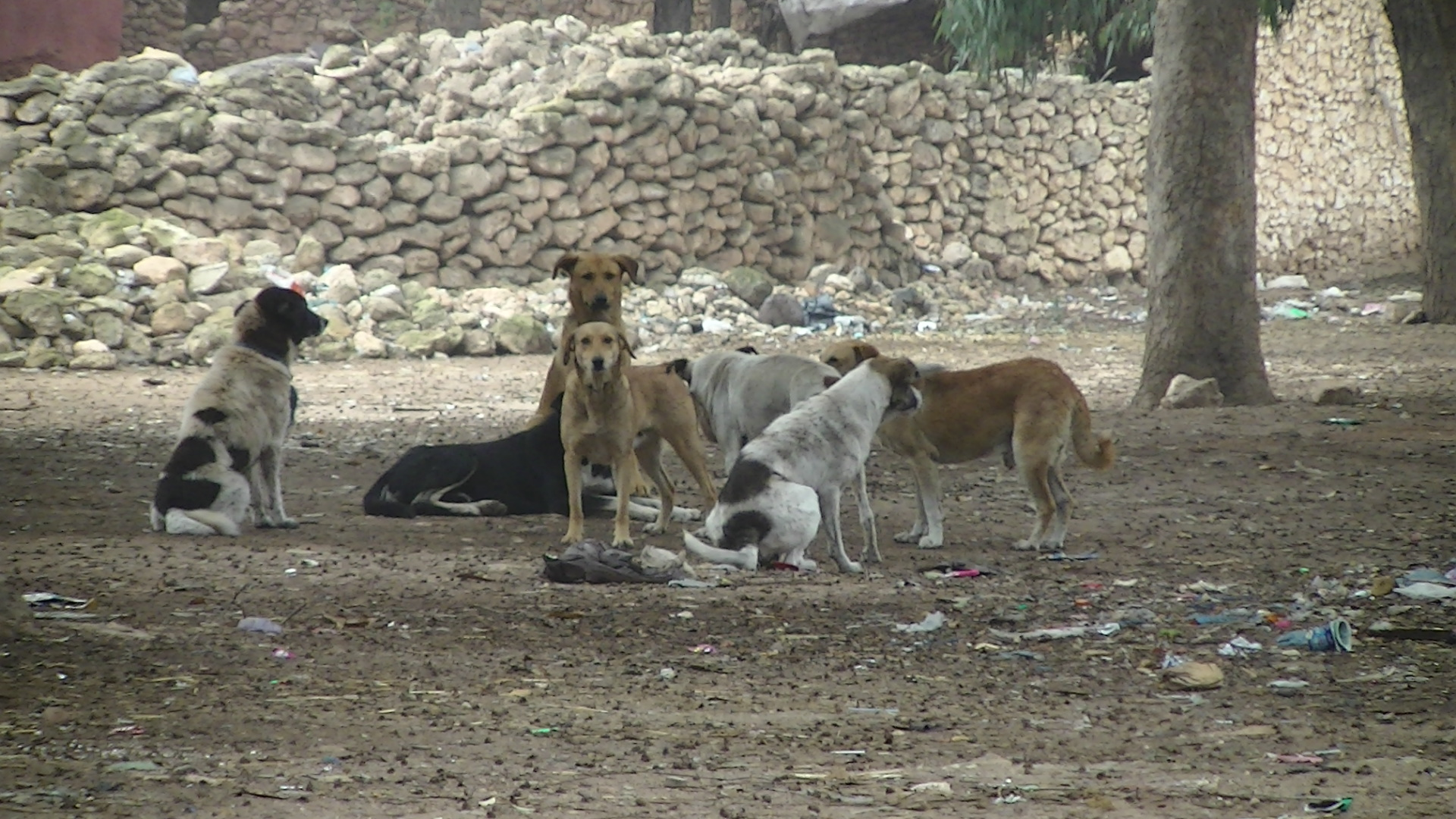
A pack of free-ranging dogs in Morocco

Wild dogs are often heard howling during the breeding season which, for pure dingoes, occurs once a year. Hybrid dogs have two oestrus cycles each year, although they may not always successfully raise young in each cycle.

After a nine-week gestation, four to six pups are born in a den that provides protection from the elements and other animals. Dens may be in soft ground under rocks, logs or other debris, or in logs or other hollows. Pups are suckled for 4–6 weeks and weaned at four months. They become independent of their parents when they are 6 weeks to 2 months old, with those becoming independent at the later time having a higher rate of survival. Increased food supplied by people also enables more pups to survive to maturity.

== Feeding habits ==
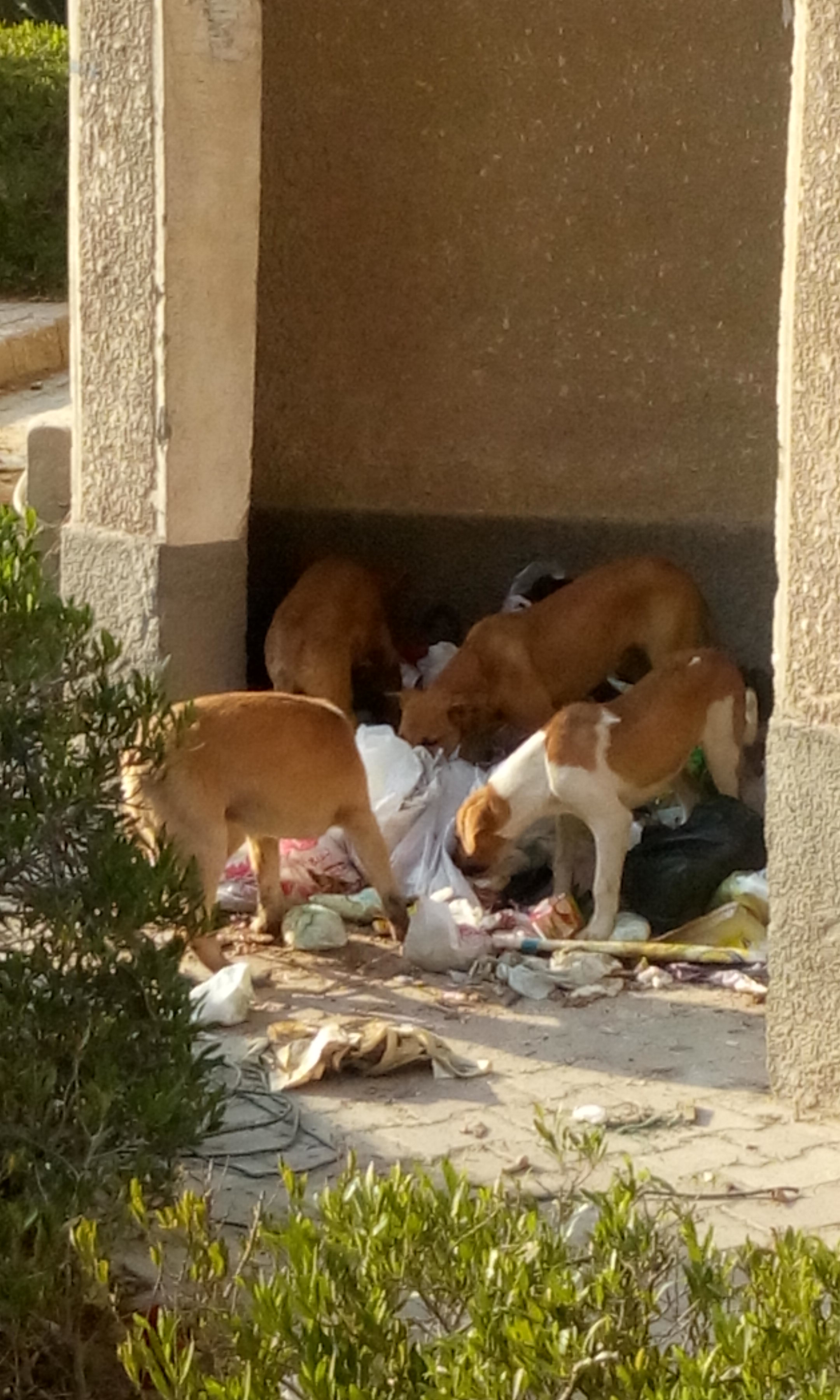
Stray dogs in Egypt scavenging in the trash

According to Queensland Department of Agriculture and Fisheries, wild dogs can be found on grazing land, on the fringes of towns, in rural-residential estates, or in forests and woodlands—anywhere there is food, water and shelter. They will eat whatever is easiest to obtain when they are hungry, animal or vegetable matter. They will hunt for live prey, or will eat road-killed animals, dead livestock, and scraps from compost heaps or rubbish. They mostly take small prey such as rabbits, possums, rats, wallabies and bandicoots. When hunting in packs, they will take larger animals such as kangaroos, goats or the young of cattle and horses. Their choice of primary prey species depends on what is abundant and easy to catch. They usually hunt in the early morning and early evening, when they locate individual prey animals by sight, approach them silently, and then pursue them. Wild dogs that depend primarily on rubbish may remain in the immediate vicinity of the source, while those that depend on livestock or wild prey may travel up to 20 km (12 mi). In a Perth study most of the 1400 dogs involved in livestock attacks were friendly and approachable family pets—very few were aggressive to people.

== Rabies impact ==
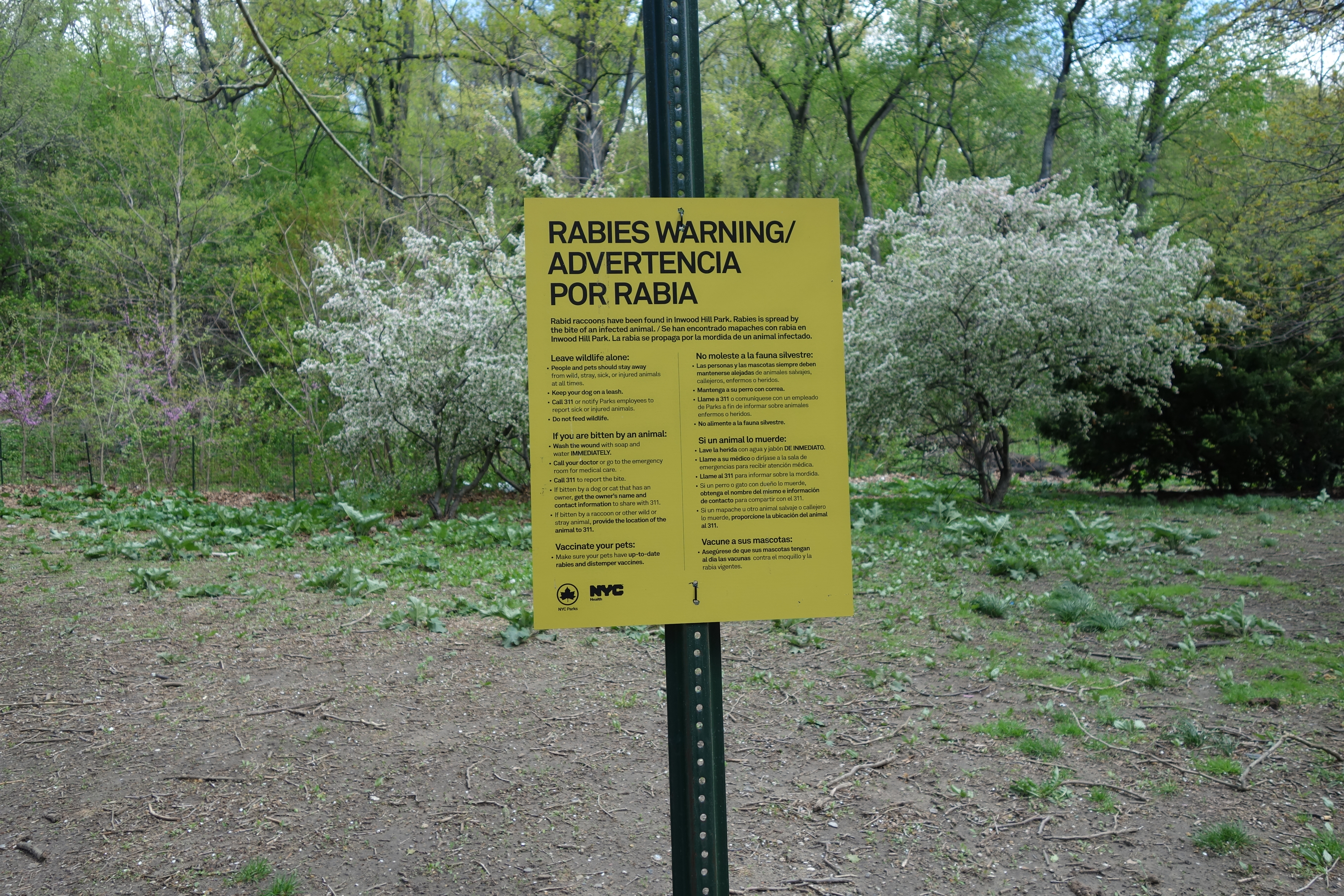
Rabies warning sign in Inwood Hill Park, in 2019

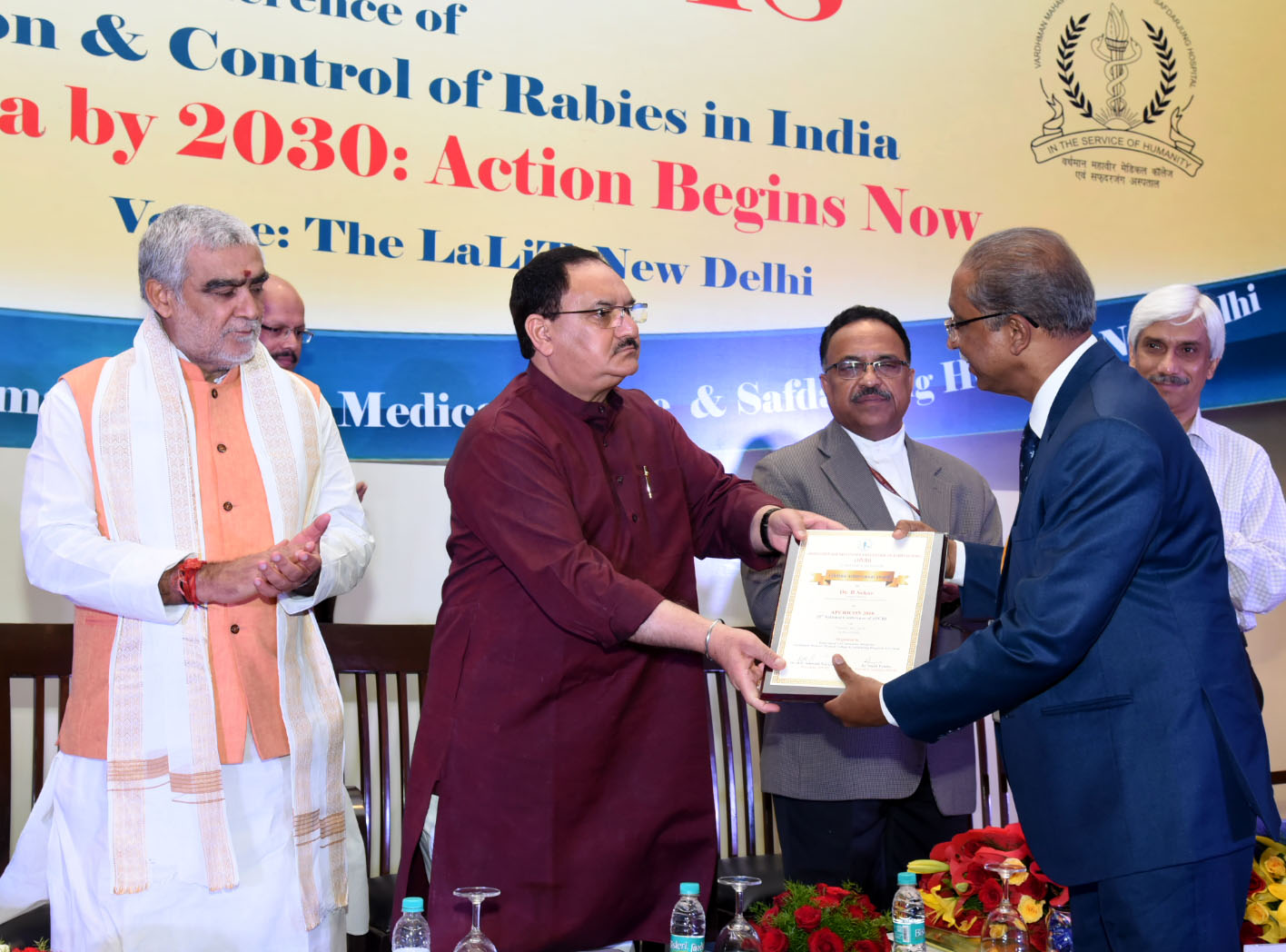
Rabies prevention efforts in India, which accounts for 36% of the world's rabies deaths

In 2011, a media article on the stray dog population by the US National Animal Interest Alliance said that there were 200 million stray dogs worldwide and that a "rabies epidemic" was causing a global public health issue. In 2024, the World Health Organization reported that dog bites and scratches caused 99% of the human rabies cases, and that 40% of victims were children under 15. It also estimated that there were about 59,000 human deaths from rabies annually, most of them occurring in Asia and Africa. Rabies cases in recent years have occurred in Europe also. In 2025, in Romania, a man died after he was bitten by a rabid stray dog. In the United States, although rabies is present primarily in the wildlife, in 2022, 50 dogs tested positive for rabies. In Africa, about 21,000–25,000 people die annually due to rabies.

There have been debates about whether pre-exposure prophylaxis (PrEP) for rabies (preventative rabies vaccines) should be administered as part of routine vaccination schemes to children who live in areas where rabies is endemic and where there are many free-ranging dogs. While PrEP does not eliminate the need for post-exposure prophylaxis (PEP) (the life-saving treatment needed after being bitten by a potentially rabid animal), PrEP simplifies the post-exposure prophylaxis treatment needed.

Some tourists from Western countries who travel abroad may not be aware of the rabies risk which exists in the countries they visit. In 2019, a woman from Norway died of rabies after she contracted the virus while on holiday in the Philippines, where she was bitten by a stray puppy that she and her friends had rescued.

== Conservation impact ==
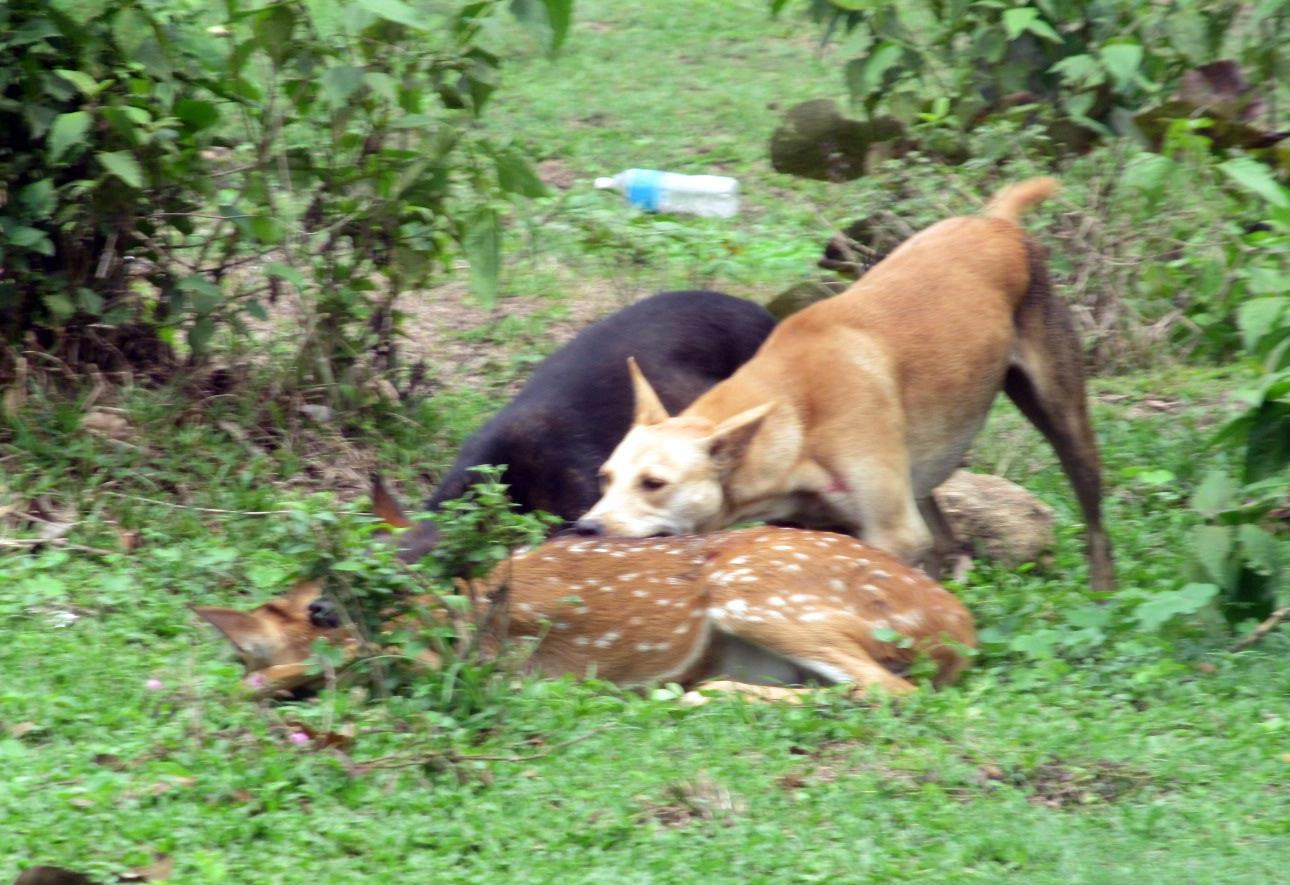
Stray dogs attacking a chital in Kerala, India.

Large numbers of free-ranging dogs can pose a threat to wildlife. Dogs have contributed to 11 vertebrate extinctions, and are a known or potential threat to 188 threatened species worldwide: 96 mammal (33 families), 78 bird (25 families), 22 reptile (10 families) and three amphibian (three families) species. In an urban environment, free-ranging dogs are often apex predators. Increasing numbers of free-ranging dogs have become a threat to the snow leopard and young brown bears on the Tibetan Plateau because dog packs chase these animals away from food.

Free-ranging dogs are often vectors of zoonotic diseases such as rabies, toxocariasis, heartworm, hookworm, ehrlichiosis, Rocky Mountain spotted fever, lyme disease, leptospirosis, Capnocytophaga, bordetellosis, and echinococcosis that can be spread to humans, and can also spread canine distemper, canine adenovirus, parvovirus and parainfluenza, which can infect other dogs and also jump into species such as African wild dogs, wolves, lions and tigers. In addition, they can interbreed with other members of the genus Canis such as the gray wolf, the Ethiopian wolf and the dingo, alongside those outside the genus such as the pampas fox, raising genetic purity concerns.

In a study conducted in 2018–2020, a wolf-dog hybrid was discovered in the Southern Carpathian forests of Romania. The study found that although this discovery may presently seem insignificant, it could pose a threat to the genetic integrity of the wolf population in the long term, and it advised the studying of the problem of stray dogs entering the habitat of wolves.

== Free-ranging urban dogs by country ==
=== South Asia ===
==== Afghanistan ====
A group of stray dogs became famous in Afghanistan after confronting a suicide bomber, preventing fifty American soldiers from being killed. However, one of the surviving dogs, Target, was mistakenly euthanized when she was brought to the United States.

==== Bhutan ====
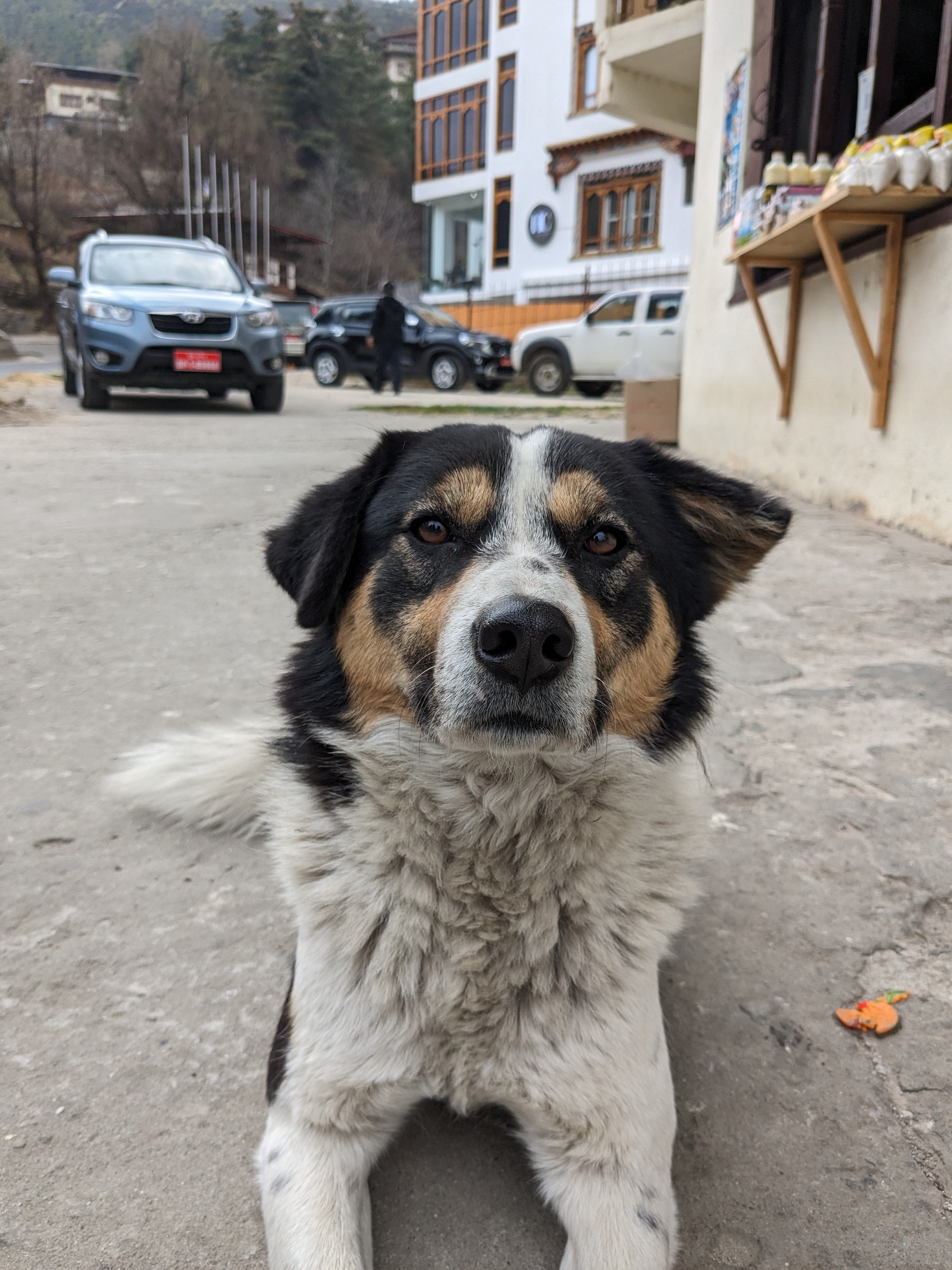
A stray dog in Thimphu, Bhutan

In October 2023, Bhutan achieved 100% sterilization of its free-roaming dogs. A nationwide sterilization initiative was carried out under the Nationwide Accelerated Dog Population Management and Rabies Control Program (NADPM&RCP) by the government. The program to manage stray dogs started in 2009 and multiple phases were carried out to achieve 100% sterilization.

Stray dogs are feared in Bhutan when they move around in packs. Dog bites are of concern in almost all cities. In May 2022, six feral stray dogs mauled and killed a seven-year-old girl in Genekha. Stray dogs have also historically posed a problem for tourists in Bhutan, who have complained about the disturbance caused by nightly howls.

An ear notch indicates a dog has been sterilized and vaccinated.

==== India ====
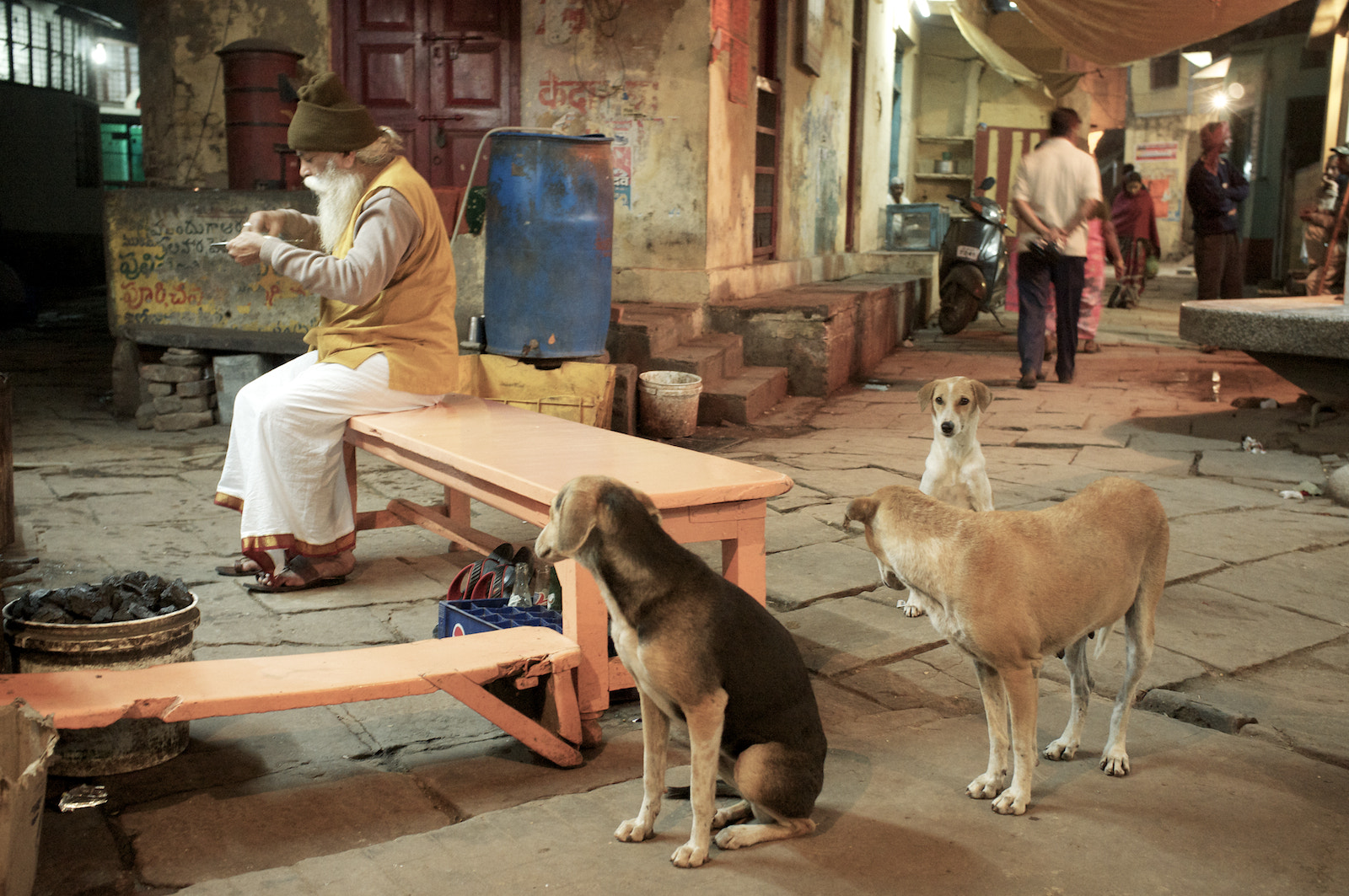
Street dogs in Varanasi, India

The term pye-dog, or more modernly INDog, is especially used to refer to such dogs from South Asia. Many free-roaming dogs in India are considered part of the Indian pariah dog breed.

The term "pariah" originates from the Tamil word meaning "outcast", which the British used to refer to stray dogs typically living on the outskirts of villages in India. The first recorded use of the term "yellow pariah dog" was by Rudyard Kipling in The Jungle Book.

Many kennel clubs now prefer the term primitive dog to describe dogs of the pariah type, reflecting their close resemblance to early domesticated dogs. The Primitive and Aboriginal Dogs Society (PADS) reclassifies pariah dogs as INDogs and categorizes them as a subgroup of primitive and aboriginal dogs.

Due to the collapse of vulture populations in India, which formerly consumed large quantities of dead animal carcasses and terminated certain pathogens from the food chain, India's urban street dog populations have exploded and become a health hazard. Mumbai, for example, has over 12 million human residents, over half of whom are slum-dwellers. At least five hundred tons of garbage remain uncollected daily. Therefore, conditions are perfect for supporting a particularly large population of stray dogs.

==== Pakistan ====
In Pakistan, several dog breeds exist including the Gaddi Kutta, Indian pariah dog, Bully Kutta, among others. In the city of Lahore, the Public Health Department launched a campaign to kill 5,000 stray dogs. In 2009, 27,576 dogs were killed within the city of Lahore; in 2005, this number was 34,942. In 2012, after 900 dogs were killed in the city of Multan, the Animal Safety Organisation in Pakistan sent a letter to Chief Minister (CM) Shahbaz Sharif recommending that "stray dogs be vaccinated rather than killed."

=== Europe ===
==== Bulgaria ====
There is a number of street dogs in Sofia, the capital of Bulgaria. The number of street dogs in Bulgaria has been reduced in recent years. While in 2007 there were 11,124 street dogs in Sofia, the number dropped to 3,589 in 2018.

==== Greece ====
There are stray dogs in Greece. In 2017, a British woman who was a tourist was mauled to death by a pack of stray dogs.

==== Italy ====
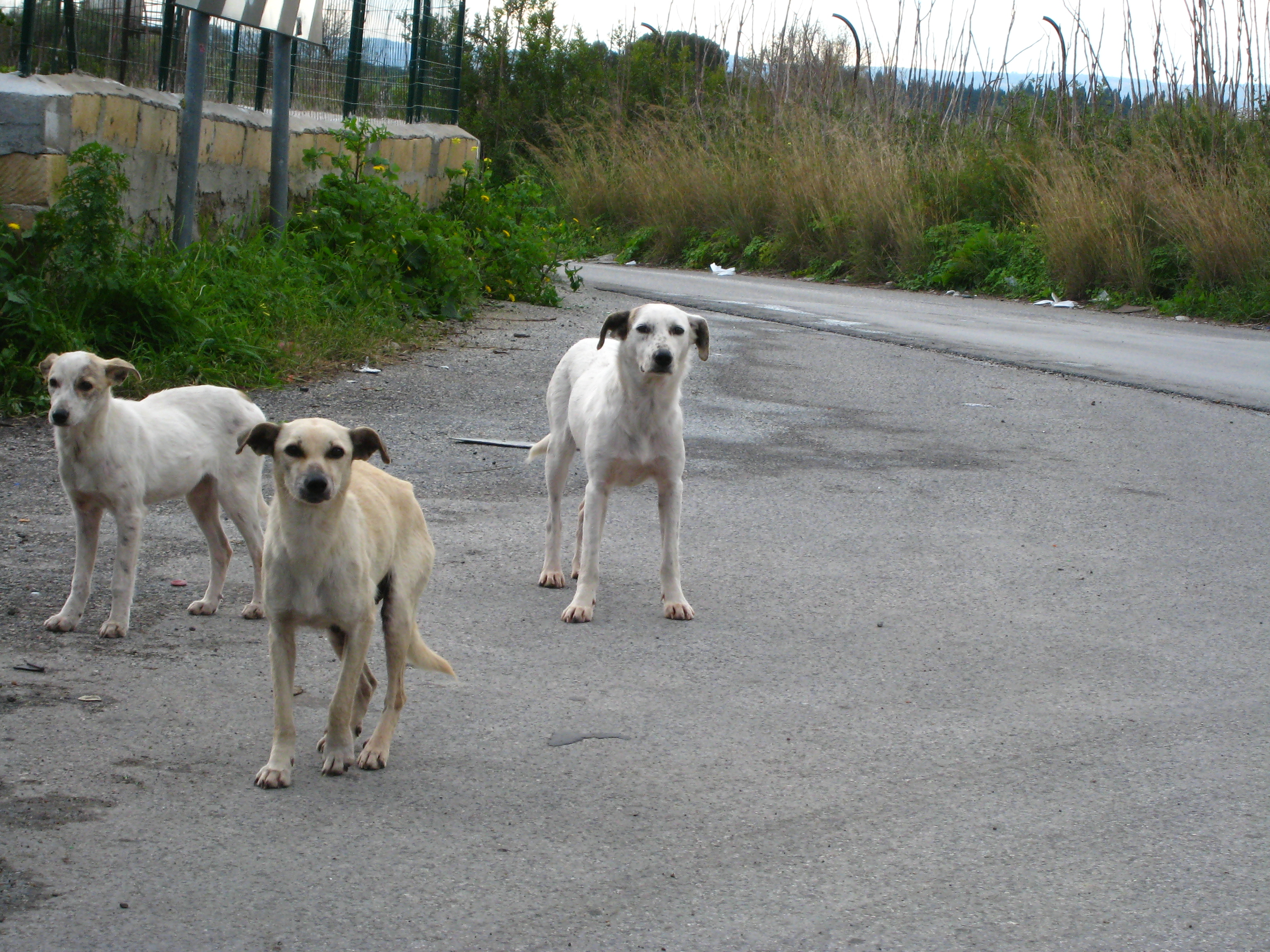
Stray dogs in Sicily

Around 80% of abandoned dogs die early due to lack of survival skills. Stray dogs are primarily found in Southern Italy.

==== Moldova ====
In 2023, it was estimated that there were about 5,000 stray dogs on the streets of Chișinău, Moldova's capital. During the first half of 2024, 791 people in Chișinău were bitten by stray dogs.

==== Portugal ====
The 2023 National Census of Stray Animals found that there were 101,015 stray dogs in Portugal.

==== Romania ====
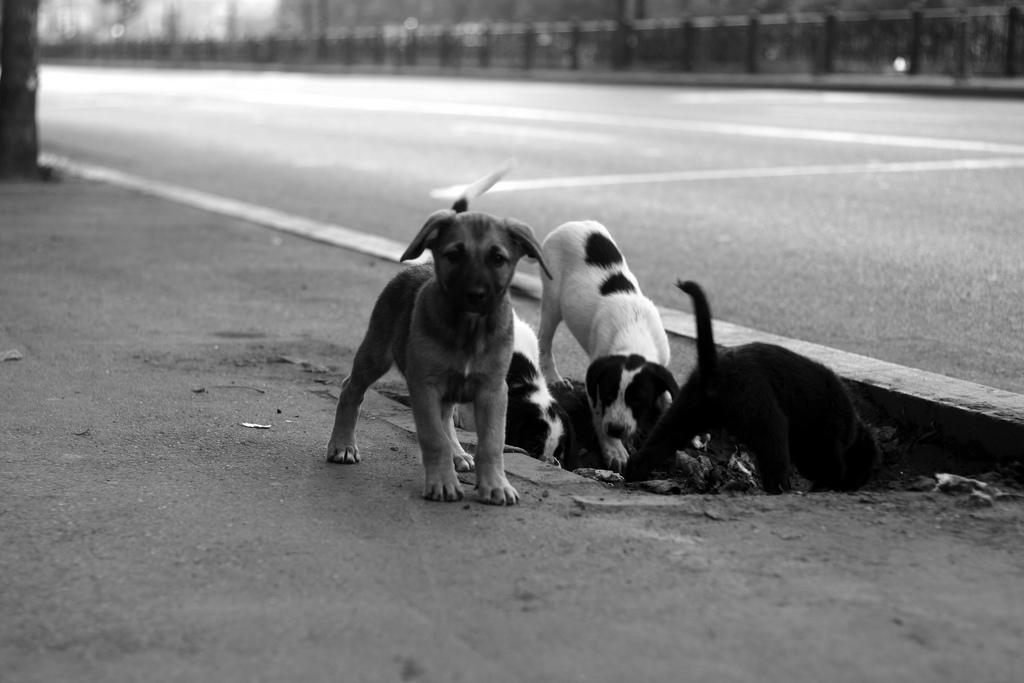
Feral puppies in Bucharest

In Romania, free-ranging urban dogs (Romanian: câini maidanezi, lit. 'wasteland dogs'; or câini comunitari, lit. 'community dogs') have been a huge problem in recent decades, especially in larger cities, with many people being bitten by dogs. The problem originates primarily in the systematization programme that took place in Communist Romania in the 1970s and 1980s under Nicolae Ceaușescu, who enacted a mass programme of demolition and reconstruction of existing villages, towns, and cities, in whole or in part, in order to build standardized blocks of flats (blocuri). The dogs from the yards of the demolished houses were abandoned on the streets, and reproduced, multiplying their numbers throughout the years. Estimations for Bucharest vary widely, but the number of stray dogs has been reduced drastically in 2014, after the death of a 4-year-old child in 2013 who was attacked by a dog. The Bucharest City Hall stated that over 51,200 stray dogs were captured from October 2013 to January 2015, with more than half being euthanized, about 23,000 being adopted, and 2,000 still residing in the municipality's shelters.

Although the number of stray dogs in Romania has been reduced significantly during the past 15 years, there have been recent fatal incidents, including in 2022, when a man was mauled to death by a pack of 15-20 stray dogs in Bacău County, and in 2023, when a woman who was jogging in a field near Lacul Morii in Ilfov County was attacked and killed by stray dogs.

Many stray dogs in Romania are adopted abroad, with the most common receiving countries being Germany, the United Kingdom, the Netherlands and Belgium.

==== Russia ====
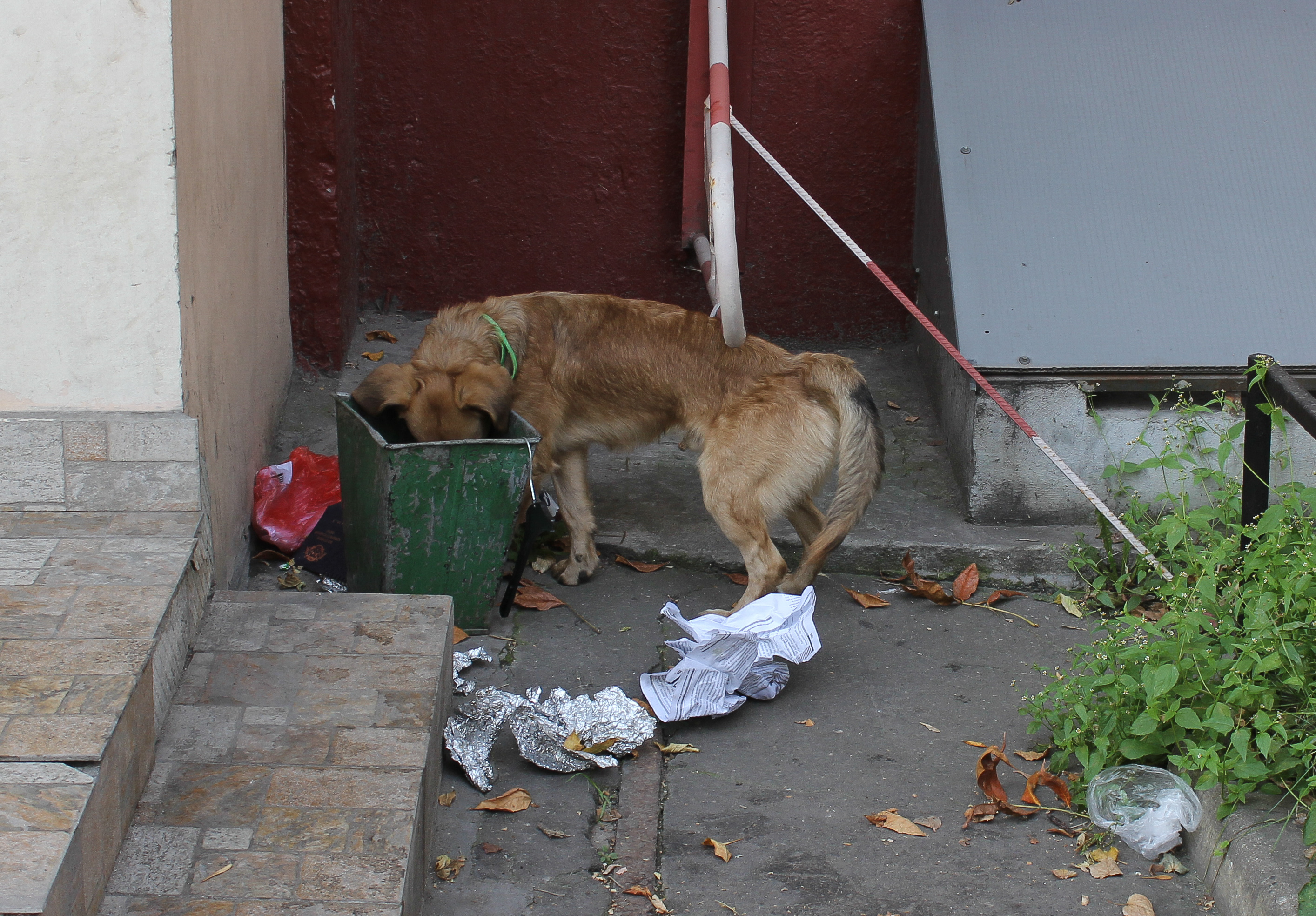
Stray dog eating from a garbage can in Moscow

Stray dogs are very common in Russia. They are found both in the countryside and in urban areas. In Russia, street dogs are accepted by the common people and are even fed by the local population, including in the capital city of Moscow. However, capturing of stray dogs by doghunters' vans and being culled has been documented since around 1900. The number of street dogs in Moscow is estimated to be up to 50,000 animals. Their sad lot was dramatized by Anton Chekhov in the famous short story Kashtanka, by Mikhail Bulgakov in the novella Heart of a Dog, and by Gavriil Troyepolsky in the novel White Bim Black Ear. When the number of street dogs massively increased in the 1990s and 2000s, attacks on humans rose. The dogs were captured and killed in retaliation. In recent years the attitude and strategy towards street dogs has changed. The dogs are caught, sterilized and it is ensured that the dogs have enough to eat. The dogs keep the city free of food leftovers and rats. Since 2002 in Moscow there exists a monument dedicated to the stray dog called Malchik (Eng: "Little boy"). Stray dogs in Moscow have adapted their behavior to traffic and the life of Moscow. The dogs even ride the metro and understand the rules of traffic lights and are often called Moscow's metro dogs.

==== Serbia ====
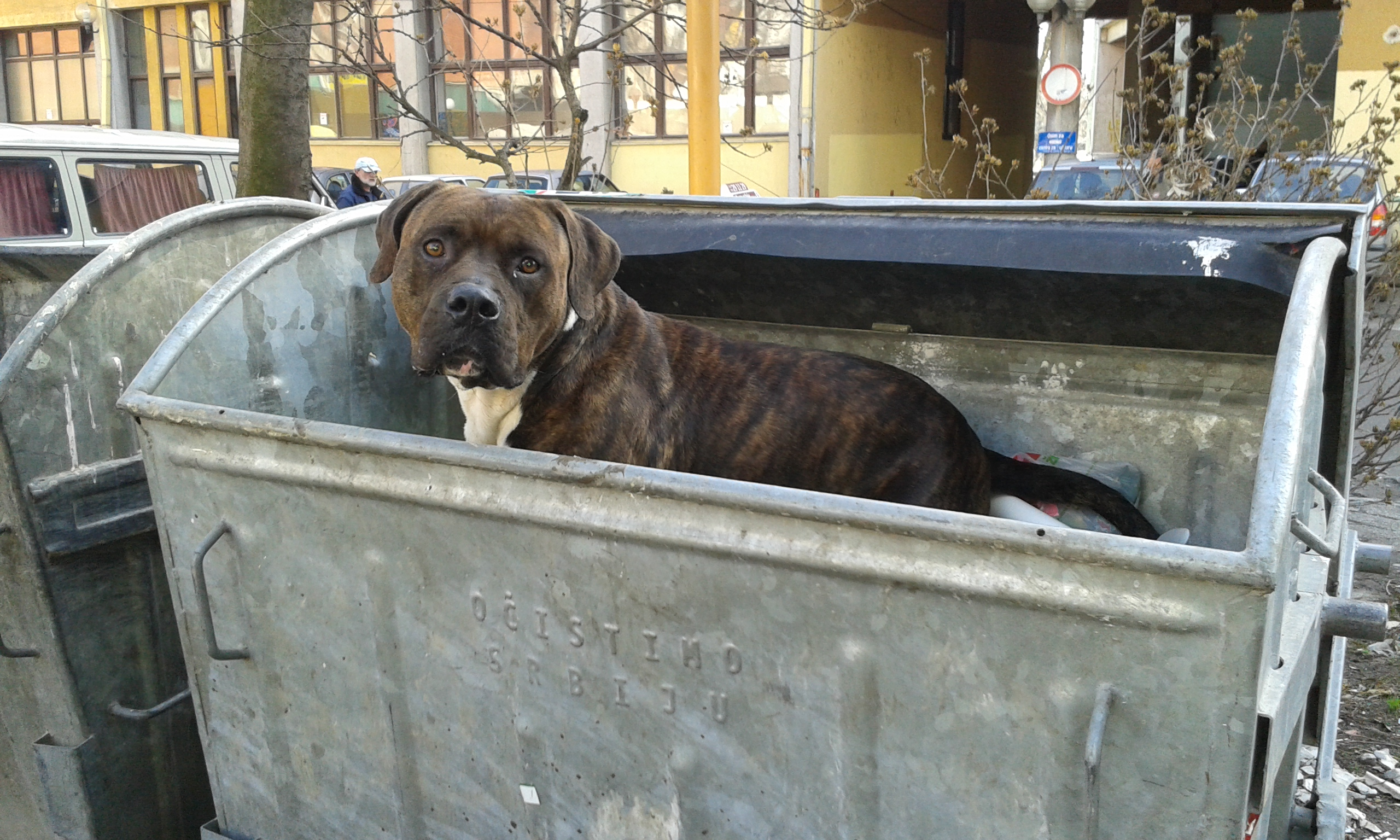
Street dog in city of Valjevo, Serbia.

It is estimated, as of 2024, that there are 400,000 free-ranging dogs in Serbia. These dogs are found both in urban and rural areas. In 2011, the largest groups of urban free-ranging dogs were found in Belgrade (more than 17,000), Novi Sad (about 10,000), Niš (between 7,000 and 10,000), Subotica (about 8,000) and Kragujevac (about 5,000).

==== Turkey ====
Street dog lying on cobbled alley in Istanbul, Turkey.

While many developing countries harbor high numbers of stray dogs as a result of neglect, Turkey's problem is a little different. In 2004, Turkish government passed a law requiring local officials to rehabilitate rather than annihilate stray dogs. The Animal Protection Law No. 5199 states a no kill, no capture policy, and unlawful euthanization are prosecutable offenses. It requires animals to be sterilized, vaccinated, and taken back to the place where they were found. Another reason for the increase in stray dog numbers is that it is easier to adopt a dog in Turkey than in many other nations. Even "dangerous breeds" could be homed before the "dangerous dogs" bill was passed at the beginning of 2022. Still, this means the vetting process for dog ownership is not extensive. There is no real punishment for discarding dogs to streets. Istanbul, the most populous city of the country, is home to one of the highest concentrations of stray animals, with an estimated 400,000 to 600,000 dogs roaming the streets. In total, it is estimated that 3 to 10 millions of stray dogs live in Turkey and expected to rise up to 60 million in 10 years.

=== North America ===
==== Canada ====
There may be up to one million free-ranging dogs across Canada including in rural British Columbia and other First Nations communities.

==== Puerto Rico ====
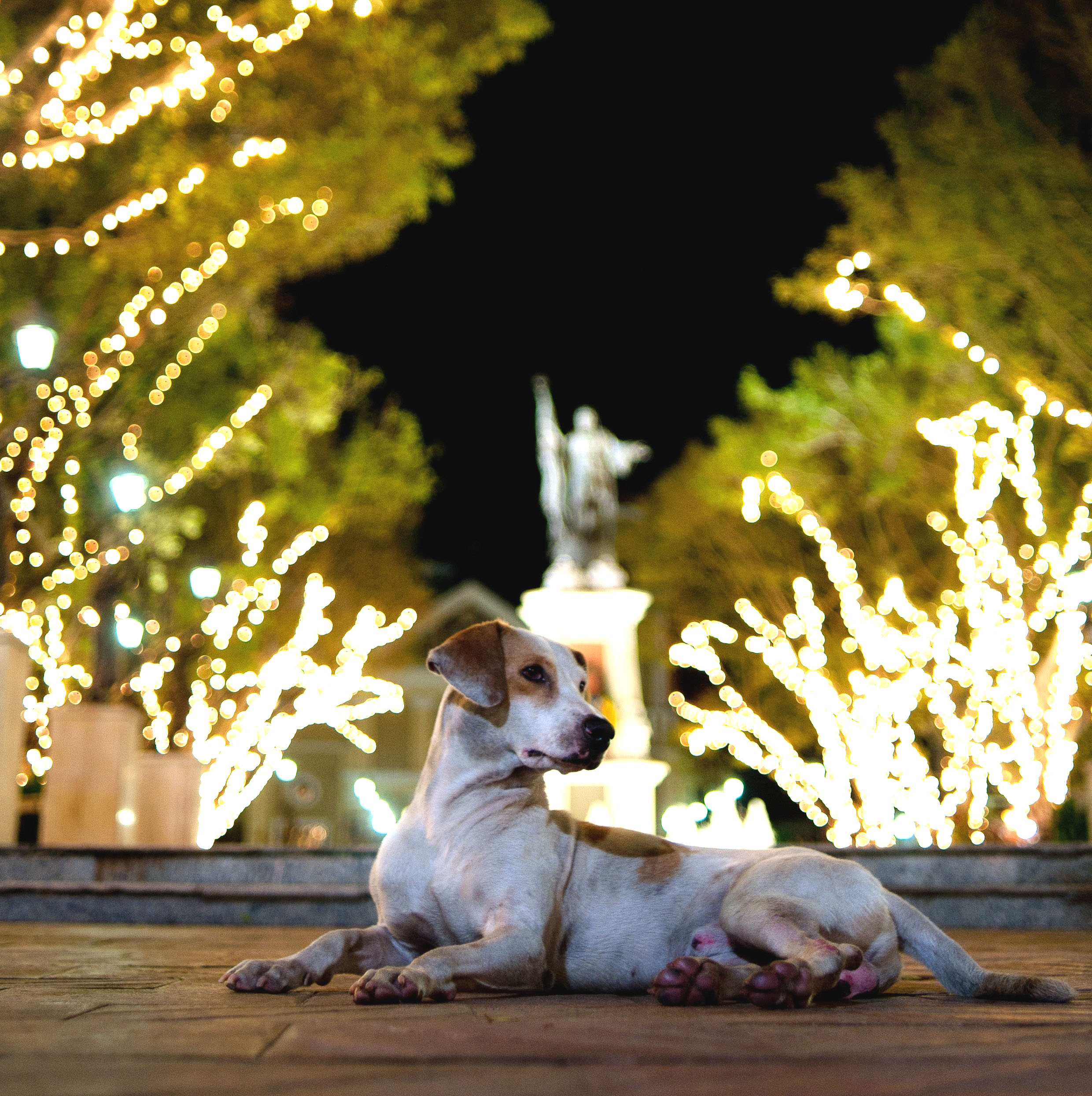
Stray dog in Mayagüez, Puerto Rico

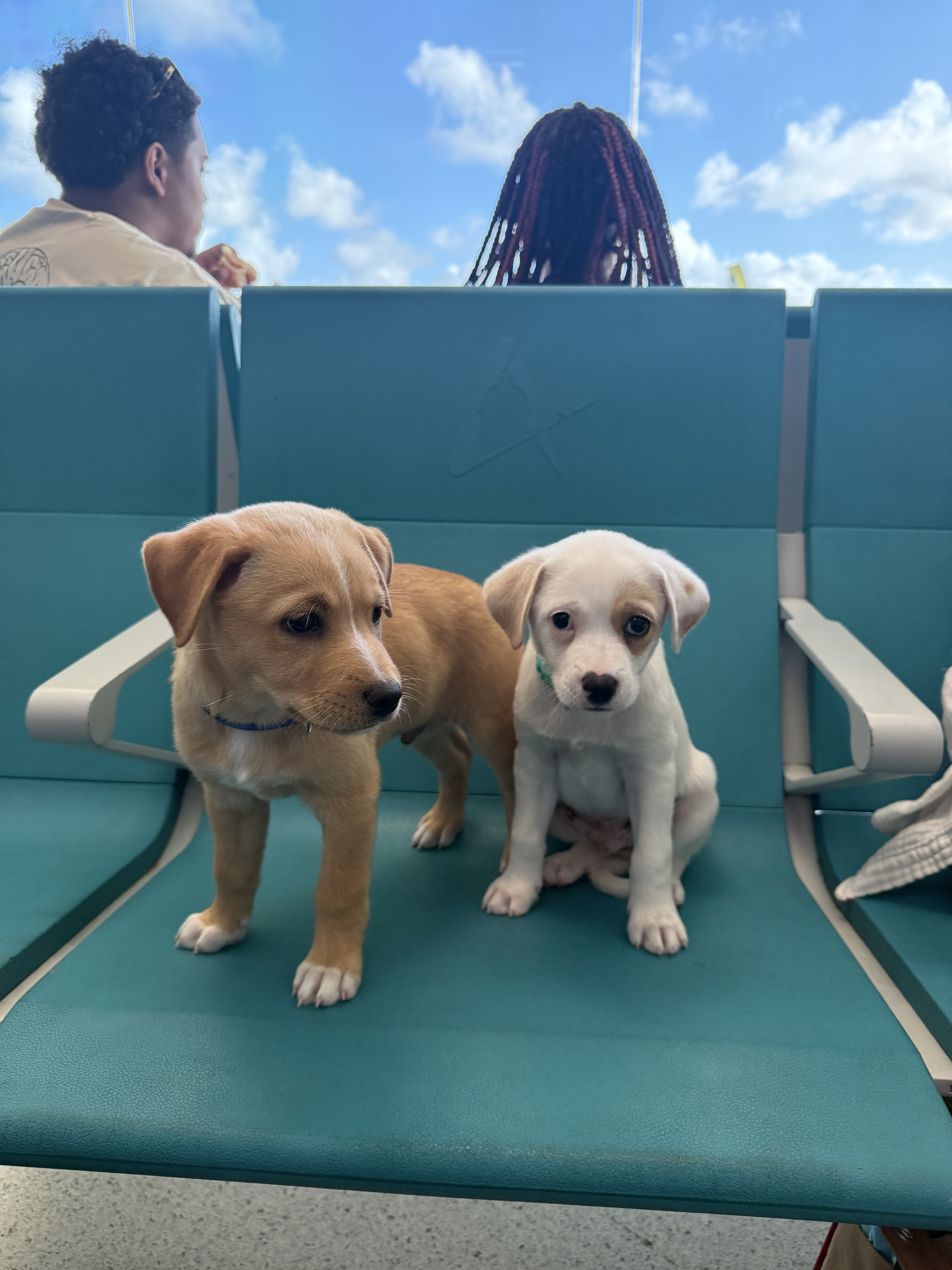
Two Sato puppies at the San Juan airport prior to being transported to the mainland United States for adoption

In Puerto Rico, street dogs (and cats) are known as satos. In the late 1990s it was estimated there were 50,000 street dogs in the U.S. territory. By 2018 there were around 300,000 stray dogs in Puerto Rico. Programs to address the problem have been launched by the Humane Society of Puerto Rico and others. In 2018, a non-profit organization called Sato Project launched its first "spayathon", a large-scale project to spay and neuter satos of Puerto Rico. Other initiatives include having mainland U.S. residents adopt the island dogs.

==== United States ====
Each year, approximately 2.7 million dogs and cats are euthanized because shelters are too full and there are not enough adoptive homes. In 2016, between 592,255 and 866,366 street dogs were euthanized in the US.

In Detroit, it was estimated that there were about 50,000 stray dogs in 2013.

=== Latin America ===
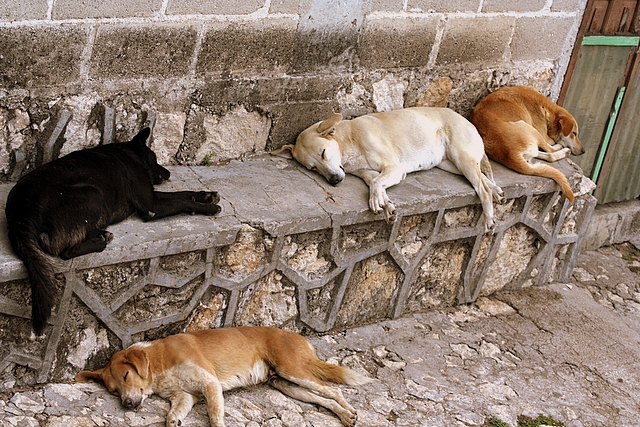
Street dogs in Chiapas, Mexico

Free-ranging dogs are common in Latin America. There are about 16 million free-ranging dogs in Mexico, 6 million in Peru and 4 million in Colombia.

==== Brazil ====
Known as vira-latas in Brazilian Portuguese, stray dogs are found throughout the country and are generally docile. Among them, the vira-lata caramelo (caramel-colored stray dog) has gained special attention in recent years as an emerging national symbol.

Central Bank of Brazil advertisement starring the caramel dog.

In July 2020, federal deputy Fred Costa launched an online petition to feature the vira-lata caramelo on Brazil's 200-real banknotes. The petition received 144,000 signatures on the platform Change.org. Although the Central Bank of Brazil had already selected the maned wolf for the new note, the initiative sparked discussions, and the institution later considered promoting actions to combat animal cruelty. In September 2020, the vira-lata caramelo was featured in the campaign that announced the release of the 200-real bill.

The growing recognition of caramel-colored dogs also reached the legislative sphere. In January 2022, the City Council of Florianópolis created "Dezembro Caramelo" (Caramel December), aimed at raising awareness about the abandonment of dogs. The city of São Gabriel, in Rio Grande do Sul, joined the campaign, emphasizing that caramel-colored strays are among the most frequent victims of animal abandonment in Brazil. In April 2023, federal deputy Felipe Becari introduced a bill to recognize the vira-lata caramelo as intangible cultural heritage in Brazil.

In Brazilian cities, many stray dogs have learned to use pedestrian crossings. Additionally, local business owners sometimes informally adopt stray dogs as "honorary employees," some even receiving uniforms.

On April 4, 2025, the iconic Christ the Redeemer statue in Rio de Janeiro was lit up with a projection showing the figure holding a caramel-colored dog, in celebration of World Stray Animal Day.

One particular caramel stray became a viral sensation after being filmed dancing with a child.

=== South-East Asia ===
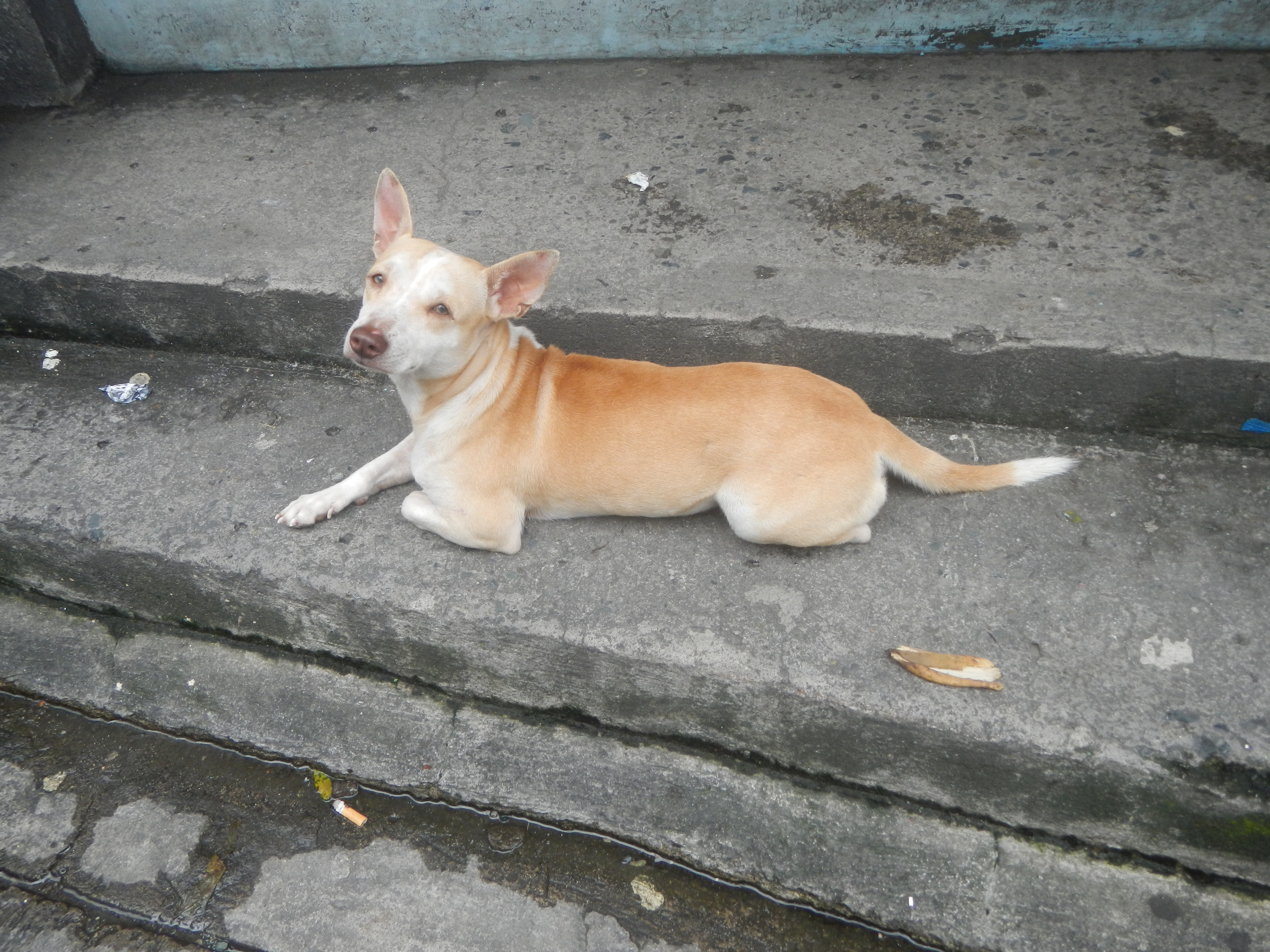
A stray Askal dog in Philippines

==== Philippines ====
Locally known as Askals, street dogs in the Philippines, while sometimes exhibiting mixing with breed dogs from elsewhere, are generally native unbred mongrel dogs.

==== Thailand ====
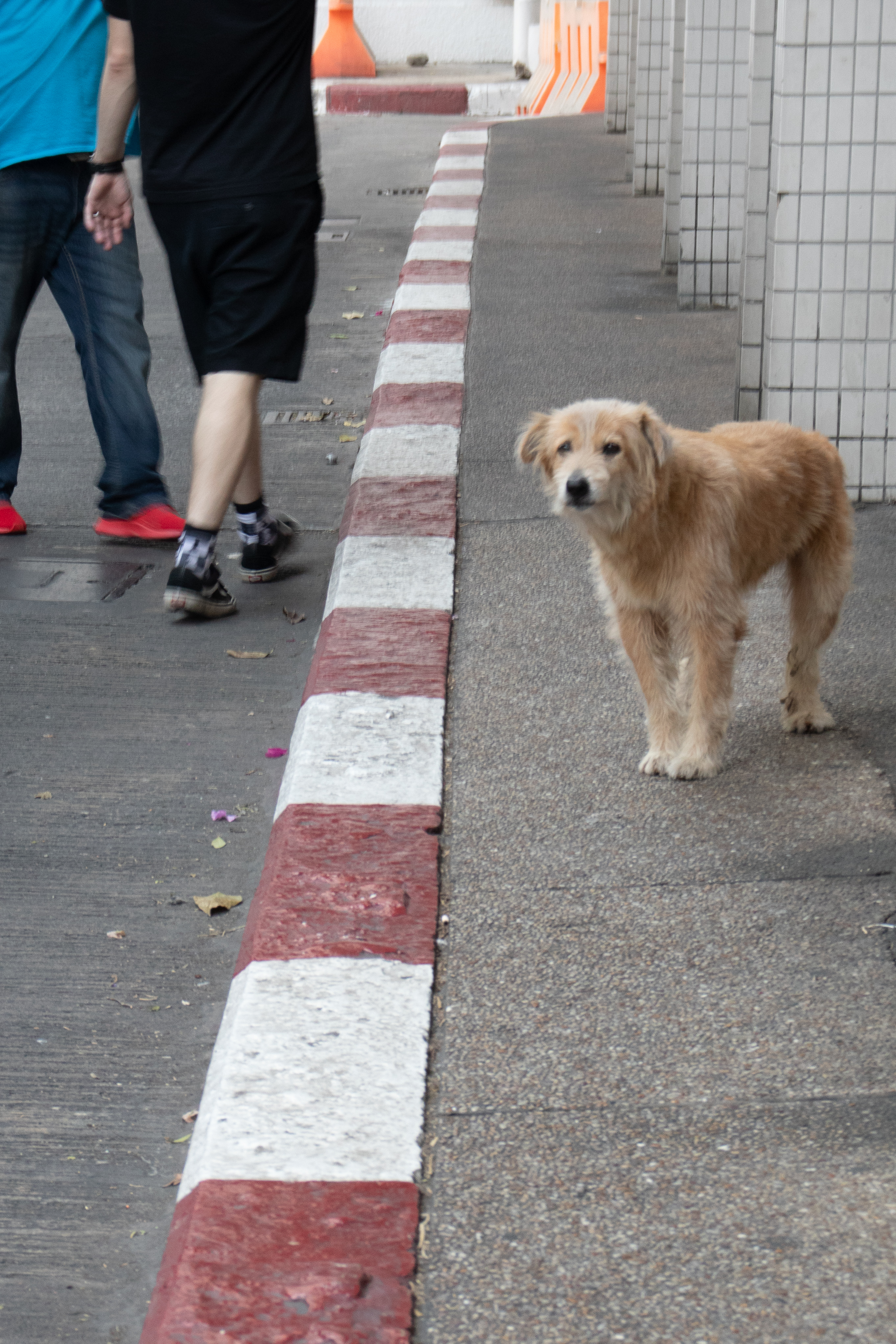
A street dog in front of the Shangri-La Hotel in Bangkok

Street dogs, commonly soi dogs (in Thai soi means 'side-street', 'lane', or 'alley') in Thailand, are ownerless, free-ranging dogs. These dogs are sometimes rounded up and sold as meat in Vietnam and China. It is estimated that there are about 8.5 million dogs in Thailand, of which about 730,000 are abandoned by their owners. Bangkok alone is estimated to have from 100,000 to 300,000 street dogs. Few have been vaccinated against canine diseases.

== Management ==
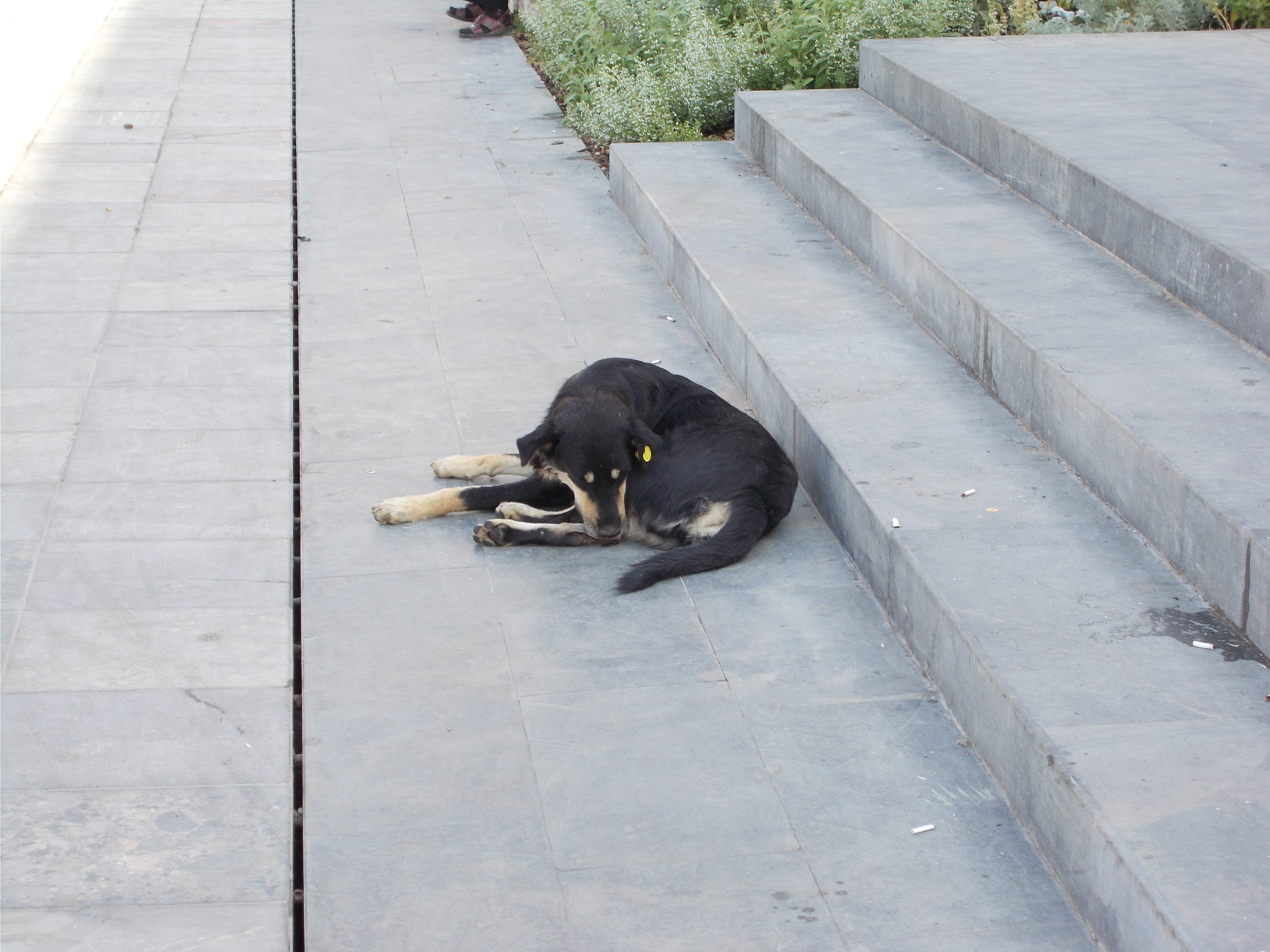
A stray dog with an ear tag in Tirana, Albania, indicating that it has been part of a trap–neuter–return program.

Given the problems associated with free-ranging dogs, including spread of diseases (especially rabies, with dog bites and scratches being responsible for 99% of the global human rabies cases), attacks on humans or other animals, and increased risk of road accidents, many places where there are free-ranging dogs have developed strategies to manage such dogs. Common approaches include the "Trap–neuter–return" approach (similar to the concept applied to feral cats) where the dogs are sterilized and, if possible, vaccinated, and then returned to the streets; or conversely, an opposite approach where the free-ranging dogs are permanently removed from the streets, by housing them indefinitely in animal shelters, giving them to adoption (including international adoption) or euthanizing them. The latter is controversial, but practiced in many countries; in the United States, every year, about 390,000 dogs in shelters are euthanized.

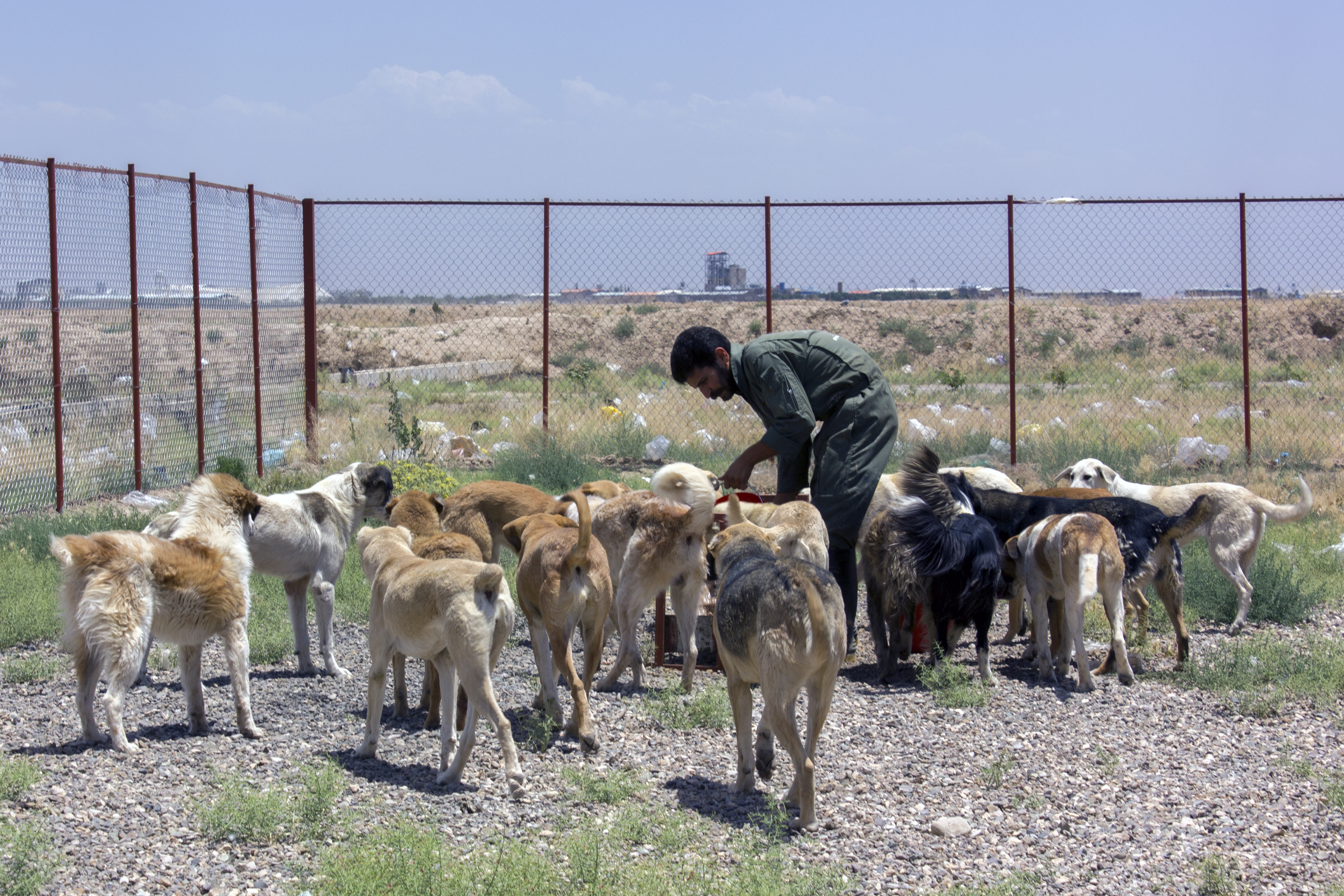
Dogs at an animal shelter in Iran.

Only a small minority of countries in the world (shown in green on the map) have been declared rabies free.

The prevention of rabies is a major goal of policies dealing with stray dogs. Mass rabies vaccination of stray dogs can be successful, provided at least 70% of stray dogs in a community are vaccinated, in order to achieve herd immunity. However, rabies vaccination of stray dogs is complex, and there are challenges to successfully managing and delivering such vaccination. A policy of "Catch-Neuter-Vaccinate-Return", where the stray dogs are captured, sterilized, vaccinated and then released back on the street, is advocated by animal rights organizations such as Four Paws. However, where this cannot be achieved, a simplified and cheaper version of only sterilizing the dogs is adopted, which helps reduce their numbers in time, but slows down the rabies eradication efforts. Policies such as oral vaccination of stray dogs (similar to the policies applied to rabies control among wildlife) have also been proposed.

There have been campaigns to educate tourists about their interaction with free-ranging dogs. This includes the necessity of getting prophylactic vaccines when traveling to some areas, the immediate seeking of medical care after being bitten by dogs, in order to prevent diseases such a rabies, tetanus and infections, and exercising caution around stray dogs, especially when they are in packs. Lack of awareness of health hazards associated with free-ranging dogs can result in injury and even death among tourists. Since 1990, over 80 American tourists have died from rabies after being exposed while traveling abroad.

The WHO and international veterinary organizations have expressed their concerns about a possible rabies outbreak in Europe due to the war in Ukraine. According to Four Paws, before the war there were about 200,000 stray dogs in Ukraine, but by 2024, the number is estimated to have reached about a million. In 2022, in the UK, the Department for Environment, Food and Rural Affairs enacted a temporary ban on importing dogs from Ukraine, Belarus, Romania and Poland. The ban was lifted on 29 October 2022, with new tighter animal health regulations entering into force. The UK is a rabies free jurisdiction, although a rabies-like lyssavirus, called European bat lyssavirus 2, exists in bats, and in 2002 a bat handler died due to this virus. Although there is no rabies in indigenous dogs in the UK, there have been cases of people dying of rabies in the UK in the 21st century, after contracting the disease abroad, with the most recent case occurring in June 2025, when a woman died of rabies in Yorkshire after having had contact with a dog in Morocco in February of that year.

== See also ==
Related dogs

- Coydog
- Dingo-dog hybrid
- Dogxim
- Jackal-dog hybrid
- Pariah dog
- Rez dog
- Taiwan Dog
- Wolfdog

Others

- Feral cat
- Manchinha case
- Urban coyote
