= Gavriil Troyepolsky =

Soviet writer

- Born: 29 November 1905; Novospasovka, Tambov Governorate
- Died: 30 June 1995 (aged 89)

Gavriil Nikolayevich Troyepolsky (or Troepolsky) (Russian: Гавриил Николаевич Троепольский) (O.S. 16 November (N.S. 29 November), 1905, Novospasovka, Tambov Governorate – 30 June 1995, Voronezh) was a Soviet writer, best known for his novel White Bim Black Ear. The novel White Bim Black Ear was published in English by name "Beem" by Harper & Row in 1978.

== Biography ==
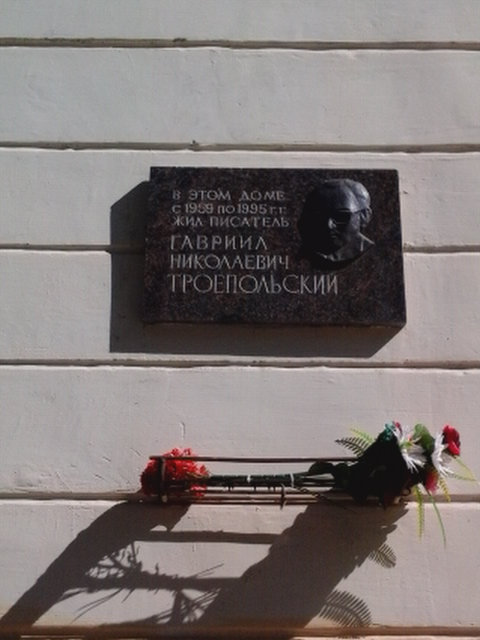
Memorial plaque in Voronezh

Troepolsky was born in Tambov Governorate, the son of a Russian Orthodox priest. He graduated from an agricultural school in 1924 and worked as an agronomist on kolkhozes until 1954, when he became a full-time writer, all his books dealing with nature and people who work the land.

His first short story appeared in 1937. His first book, the collection Iz zapisok agronoma [Diaries of an Agronomist], was published in 1953 by Novy Mir; in it he "ridiculed district party secretaries, kolkhoz chairmen, village demagogues and thieves"—"His discerning first-person narrator introduces readers to the lyrical beauties of the Russian landscape and the grotesque human figures that dot it." The following year he moved to Voronezh, where he remained the rest of his life.

His first novel, Chernozem [Black Earth], appeared in Novy Mir in 1958–1961; it describes rural life under Joseph Stalin and was attacked by the Soviet literary establishment. His O rekakh, pochvakh i prochikh [About rivers, soils, and other things] (1965) documented the misuse of Russia's natural resources and predicted an ecological disaster. It was his Bely Bim, Chernoye ukho [translated as White Bim, the Black Ear] (1971) that brought Troepolsky fame. The titular setter was identified with his editor and close friend Alexander Tvardovsky, who died the same year. The story sold millions of copies around the world, "all the currency proceeds of which were taken by the state."

Troepolsky was elected to the board of the USSR Union of Writers in 1967. In 1975, he received the State Prize, and afterwards he held a senior position on the board of the Russian Federation Union of Writers. His works appeared in Literaturnaya Gazeta and other literary magazines, and his three-volume Complete Works was published in 1977–78. Jeanne Vronskaya writes: "He is reported to have expressed joy when the Communist system collapsed. His house in Voronezh, became a place of pilgrimage for young writers." In 1993 he became an honorary citizen of Voronezh.

== Sources ==
- Jeanne Vronskaya, OBITUARIES : Gavriil Troepolsky, The Independent, 31 July 1995
