= White Bim Black Ear =

- USSR film poster
- Directed by: Stanislav Rostotsky
- Screenplay by: Stanislav Rostotsky; Gavriil Troyepolsky
- Based on: White Bim Black Ear by Gavriil Troyepolsky
- Starring: Vyacheslav Tikhonov; Valentina Vladimirova; Mikhail Dadyko; Ivan Ryzhov; Irina Shevchuk
- Cinematography: Vyacheslav Shumsky; Sergey Serebryannikov
- Music by: Andrei Petrov
- Production company: Gorky Film Studio
- Release date: September 15, 1977
- Running time: 183 minutes
- Country: Soviet Union
- Language: Russian

White Bim Black Ear (Russian: Белый Бим Чёрное ухо, romanized: Belyy Bim, Chyornoe ukho) is a 1977 Soviet drama film directed by Stanislav Rostotsky. It is based on the book of the same name, written by Gavriil Troyepolsky and is about a white English Setter with a black ear who becomes homeless because of his master's illness. The film was nominated for the Academy Award for Best Foreign Language Film at the 51st Academy Awards.

== Plot ==
=== Part 1 ===
In the early spring, the writer Ivan Ivanovich sets out to find a Gordon Setter from a breeder. Eventually, he takes in the only puppy from the litter that the breeder had planned to euthanize because it was unique: young Bim, white instead of black, but with one black ear. As months pass, Ivan and Bim become inseparable. The dog becomes familiar with Ivan's daily routine, waiting for him outside the editorial office, the barbershop, and joining him on hunting trips—even if Ivan has to occasionally bribe a bus driver for transportation. However, two issues disrupt their peaceful life: due to his unusual color, Bim is not recognized as a hunting dog by official associations and is denied official hunting documents. Additionally, one of Ivan's neighbors harbors animosity towards Bim, reporting him to the landlord as aggressive and spreading rumors of his dangerousness.

As winter approaches, Ivan's health deteriorates. A fragment lodged near his heart—a wartime injury—takes a toll on him, leading to his hospitalization. Rushed to Moscow for surgery, Ivan leaves Bim in the care of his neighbor Stepanovna, who lives with her granddaughter. With Ivan unwell, Bim starts wandering alone during walks. However, he escapes one day in search of his master. He heads to the nearest hospital, returns to the empty apartment at night, and resumes his search the next day. Refusing to eat, he grows thin, soon seen as a stray in the city center. A student named Dasha finds him being labeled as rabid and aggressive by a quarrelsome neighbor. Ivan is traced as the dog's owner, and Dasha brings Bim back to Stepanovna. Dasha arranges for an identification tag for Bim, summarizing vital information about the dog and its owner. This is how Bim meets the boy Tolik, who feeds him and grows attached to him. However, Bim is later abducted by a dubious man after his identification tag, then released back onto the streets. Lost and recognized at the train station by Dasha, she urges him to go home, but Bim follows the train. Exhausted after several kilometers, he collapses on the tracks.

=== Part 2 ===
Bim is found by station workers who tend to him before letting him go. Meanwhile, Dasha boards a train in the opposite direction at the next station. Returning to Ivan's apartment, she learns only that Bim has been missing for several days. Bim gets his paw caught in a sudden switch change, is discovered and freed by train conductors, and returns bleeding to his apartment. Dasha tends to him, and he stays with Stepanovna for the next few days. However, Bim is soon allowed outside again. He revisits places he used to frequent with Ivan and ends up at the bus parking lot, where the driver recognizes him. The driver sells Bim to a hunter, who takes him home to his family, where Bim, now named Black Ear, befriends the hunter's son, Alyosha, among others. The man lends his acquaintance Klim the dog for hunting, but Bim breaks free. The snow cuts his paws, but he drags himself to Tolik's apartment.

Thrilled to see Bim again, Tolik's parents are not pleased. In the night, Tolik's father takes Bim into the forest and leaves him tied up there. Overcome by guilt, he returns the next morning, but Bim has already freed himself. Bim returns to his apartment, but the quarrelsome neighbor refuses him entry. The dog catchers take Bim away again, convinced once more by the neighbor's claims of rabid aggression. Weak, Bim is kept in quarantine—on the bed of a truck, in the middle of winter. Meanwhile, Tolik's father places a missing dog ad for Bim in the newspaper. Ivan reads it upon his discharge from the hospital and rushes to the animal shelter. After some difficulties, he is allowed to look into the quarantine truck, but Bim has already died. Ivan tells Tolik and Alyosha, who have also arrived at the shelter, that Bim wasn't there. The next day, Ivan returns to the shelter. Bim is given a hunter's farewell with three shots. Ivan takes in another stray dog, whom the men had intended to release.

Spring arrives, and Ivan and Tolik take a walk in the forest. Tolik has a dog with him whom he calls Bim. This young white Gordon Setter resembles Bim, but with one ear and one side of its face black.

== Cast ==
- Vyacheslav Tikhonov as Ivan Ivanovich (Master)
- Vasya Vorob'ev as Tolik (the boy who picked up the dog)
- Irina Shevchuk as Dasha
- Valentina Vladimirova as Sneaky Woman
- Andrey Martynov as driver
- Anya Rybnikova as Lyusya (a girl)
- Yuri Grigor'ev as police officer
- Two English Setters as Bim

== See also ==
- Hachikō
- List of submissions to the 51st Academy Awards for Best Foreign Language Film
- List of Soviet submissions for the Academy Award for Best Foreign Language Film
