= Bolivia Mar =

Enclave of Bolivia

- Enclave of Bolivia
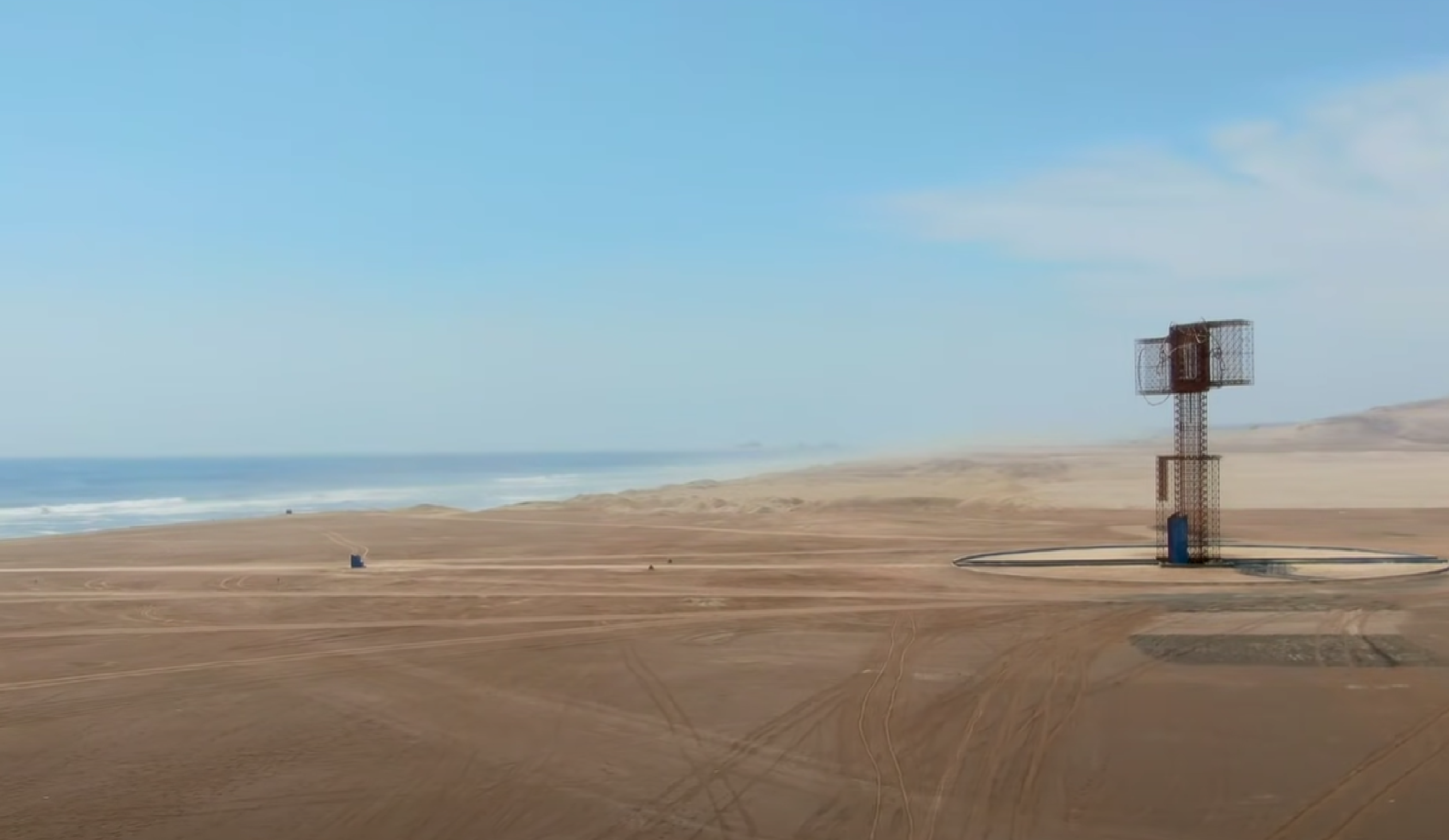
- The beach's monument in 2021
- Interactive map of Bolivia Mar
- Coordinates: 17.740°S 71.258°W
- Country: Peru
- Region: Moquegua
- Province: Ilo
- District: Ilo

Dimensions
  - Length: 5 km (3.1 mi)
  - Width: 0.8 km (0.50 mi)
- Elevation: 0 m (0 ft)

Population (2024)
  - Total: 0
- Time zone: UTC-5 (PET)

Bolivia Mar (also written Boliviamar) is a beach south of Ilo, Peru, ceded in 1992 by the Peruvian government to Bolivia for a renewable period of 99 years. It is located in Ilo Province in the Department of Moquegua, currently administered of the city of Ilo until Bolivia assumes its administration. The agreement was signed by Alberto Fujimori and Jaime Paz Zamora, then presidents of Peru and Bolivia, respectively.

== Description ==
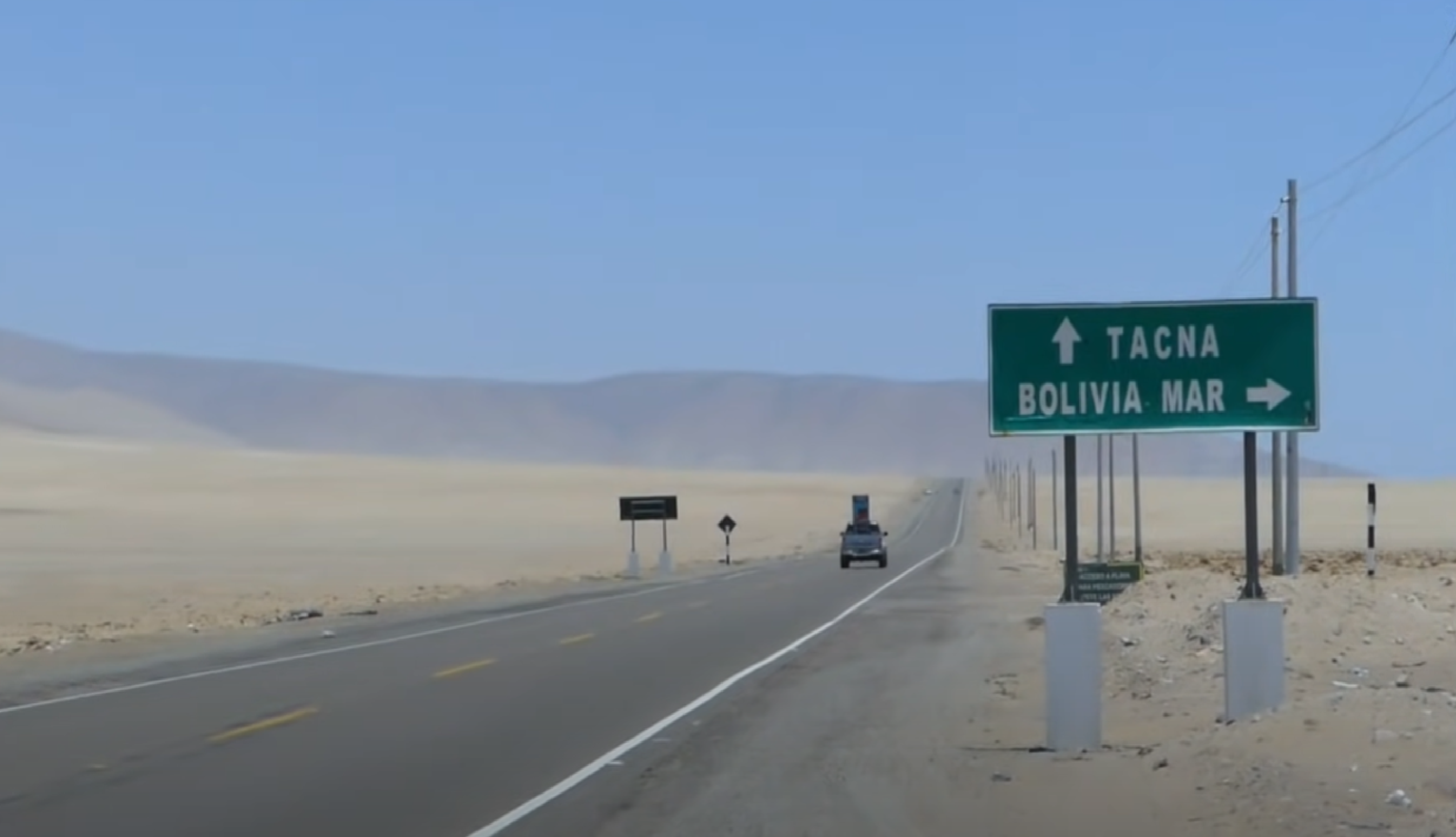
Roadsign at the entrance to Boliviamar beach.

It was projected that the concession would serve to reduce commercial ties with the Chilean ports of Iquique and Arica, where Bolivia enters and ships most of its merchandise, and finally leave behind the belief that its access to the ocean depends on the country that kept the Litoral Department, which gave it access to the Pacific Ocean after the war of the same name (1879–1884), in which Bolivia and Peru faced Chile.

The Ilo agreements signed in 1992 stipulated "the transfer of Bolivia Mar." But also two other elements: creating an industrial free zone in the Peruvian city of Ilo and providing facilities to Bolivians so that they can use the port facilities of that town. The agreement did not mean territorial secession or Bolivian freedom to do what best suits it; this expressed the disagreement of the Bolivian Consulate in Ilo, which expressed that the Bolivian State is not allowed to build a port and the beach is only limited to tourist trade.

Also weighing heavily is the fact that the Bolivian government does not see investing in Bolivia Mar as feasible, since this would affect its geopolitical aspirations against Chile, since the Government in Santiago would use it as an excuse to flatly deny granting it any sovereign enclave or salient.

Strategically, Bolivia prefers to invest in the port of Ilo to counteract Arica and Iquique, in this way it does not intervene in its foreign policy of going to sea through northern Chile, and at the same time manage to reduce its dependence on northern Chilean ports.

== History ==
The beginning of the development of an enclave for Bolivia on the southern Peruvian coast began after the terrorist attack by the Shining Path on the Bolivian embassy in Lima on 22 July 1992. La Paz demanded compensation in good faith from the government of Alberto Fujimori due to that incident committed against their diplomatic delegation, this caused the government of both countries to begin talks that came to the idea of a trading post in Ilo for Bolivia as compensation for the destruction of the diplomatic office.

The 1992 agreement agreed by Fujimori and Jaime Paz Zamora sought the construction of tourist centres by Bolivia, but the steep terrain and difficult access forced an investment of a few hundred million dollars to build the necessary infrastructure. Bolivia has not had the initiative, probably due to lack of resources.

In 2022, then Peruvian president Pedro Castillo spoke about the possibility of giving access to the sea to Bolivia through a popular consultation, which sparked a controversy in Peru against Castillo, leading to a complaint for treason, for which the Peruvian president had to clarify his position, mentioning that he was referring to the territory of Bolivia Mar, as well as an expansion of the area.

== Landmarks ==
- A sign at the Pan-American Highway marks the entrance to the beach through a dirt road leading to a monument
- Dos Mujeres (Spanish for "Two women"), a 21-metre metal sculpture featuring two female faces: one looking towards the sea, and another towards Bolivia.

== See also ==
- Charaña, Bolivia's closest point to the coast
- CECONA, located in Peru and under Ecuadorian administration
- Port of Arica, located in Chile and under Peruvian administration
