= Ilo =

Ilo, ILO or variations may refer to:

== Places ==
- Ilo Province, one of three provinces that make up the Moquegua Region in Peru
  - Ilo District
  - Ilo, Peru, a port in southern Peru
- Lake Ilo, a man-made lake in Lake Ilo National Wildlife Refuge, North Dakota, United States

== Organizations ==
- iLo Technologies, a Walmart consumer electronics house brand
- ILO-Motorenwerke, a former German manufacturer of two-stroke engines
- International Labour Organization, a specialized agency of the United Nations that deals with labour issues
- International Left Opposition, an opposition group within the Comintern

== People ==
- Dhimitër Ilo (1862–1947), one of the signatories of the Albanian Declaration of Independence
- Miikka Ilo (born 1982), Finnish footballer
- Spiridon Ilo (1876–1950), one of the founding fathers of Albania
- Ilo Wallace (1889–1981), wife of Henry A. Wallace, the 33rd Vice President of the United States

== Other uses ==
- Alternative name for Ido, a constructed language
- HP Integrated Lights-Out (iLO), the management processor used on most Hewlett-Packard ProLiant servers
- Iloilo International Airport's IATA code
- Injection-locked oscillator, a type of oscillator used in LC circuits
- International Linguistics Olympiad, part of International Science Olympiads
- ISO 639-2 and ISO 639-3 code for Ilokano language, spoken in the Philippines

== See also ==
- Ylo (disambiguation)
