= Sonia Guillén =

Peruvian anthropologist

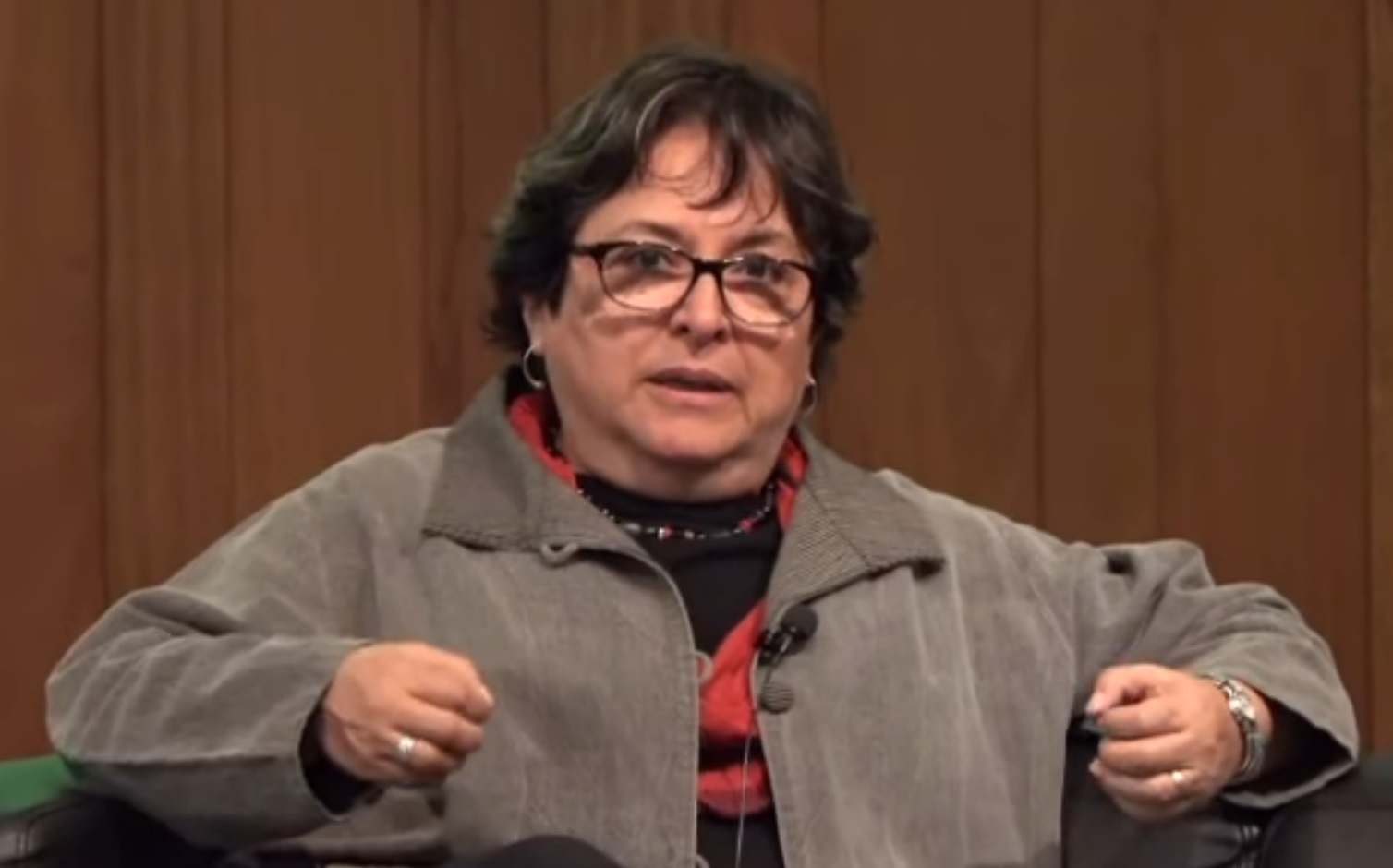
- Sonia Guillén speaks on the cultural production of the Amazon in 2016

13th Minister of Culture
- In office 7 December 2019 – 29 May 2020
- President: Martín Vizcarra
- Prime Minister: Vicente Zeballos
- Preceded by: Francesco Petrozzi
- Succeeded by: Alejandro Neyra

Personal details
- Born: Sonia Elizabeth Guillén
- Education: National University of San Marcos (BS); University of Michigan (PhD)
- Occupation: Anthropologist
- Awards: Foreign Associate of the National Academy of Sciences (2012)

Sonia Elizabeth Guillén is a Peruvian anthropologist and the President of the Centro Mallqui, who is the current Minister of Culture of Peru. She was elected a foreign associate the National Academy of Sciences (NAS) in 2012.

== Early life and education ==
Guillén studied at Callao High School and graduated in 1969. She attended the National University of San Marcos, where she studied archaeology. Guillén was a Fulbright Program scholar. She moved to the United States and studied anthropology at the University of Michigan. Guillén earned her doctorate at the University of Michigan in 1992. During her time in Michigan, Guillén attended a course in osteology delivered by Jane E. Buikstra at Northwestern University. She worked alongside Lawrence Angel, Douglas H. Ubelaker and Thomas Dale Stewart at the Smithsonian Institution. She has been a professor at the Pontifical Catholic University of Peru.

== Research and career ==
Guillén is one of Peru's leading experts in mummies. She is the Director of The Bioanthropology Foundation Peru, Centro Mallqui. She has investigated Ilo in Southern Peru, where she established the Centro Mallqui. In 1997 Guillen discovered hundreds of mummies in an ancient mausoleum in Ilo. The mausoleum was located in a cliff around 300 feet above a lake. Guillén has described the finding as one of the most significant of the Inca Empire. She was concerned that the Huercos would have looted the ancient graves and cities. Guillén and co-workers were the first to show that the Inca's reserved their royal dead. The Inca mummies are believed to be an important part of ancient life, and were even present in meetings. Guillén was responsible for the valuable artefacts in the site, including well preserved knotted springs known as khipu. She studies the mummies in climate-controlled laboratories, and has to act fast to prevent degradation.

She discovered the mummies of the chiribaya dog, which was the second breed of dog to exist in Peru in the pre-Columbian era. Between 1999 and 2000, Guillén identified two mummified Chiribaya Dog skulls. She was also involved with the discovery of the Lady of Cao. She was concerned about the mummy being on show at the National Geographic Society. She uncovered that Lady of Cao had likely suffered from eclampsia. Guillén used electron microscopy to identify salt crystals, which implied that Lady of Cao was washed with sea water. She discovered over 82 dog tombs in pre-Columbian era pet cemeteries. She has studied the burial sites of Peruvian Hairless Dogs.

She has been involved with the creation of the Ciribaya and Leymebamba Museums. She was appointed Director General of Museums and Vice Minister of Culture. In 2007 Guillén created a master's program in forensic anthropology. She accepted students from the Washtenaw Community College. Guillén was appointed director of the National Museum of Archaeology, Anthropology and History of Peru in 2018.

=== Awards and honors ===
Guillen was elected a foreign associate of the National Academy of Sciences (NAS) in 2012.
