= SCPM =

SCPM may refer to:

- Dr. William M. Scholl College of Podiatric Medicine
- The ICAO code for Pichilemu Aerodrome
