= 1992 Bolivian embassy attack in Lima =

Terrorist attack in Lima, Peru

1992 Bolivian embassy attack
- Part of the Peruvian conflict
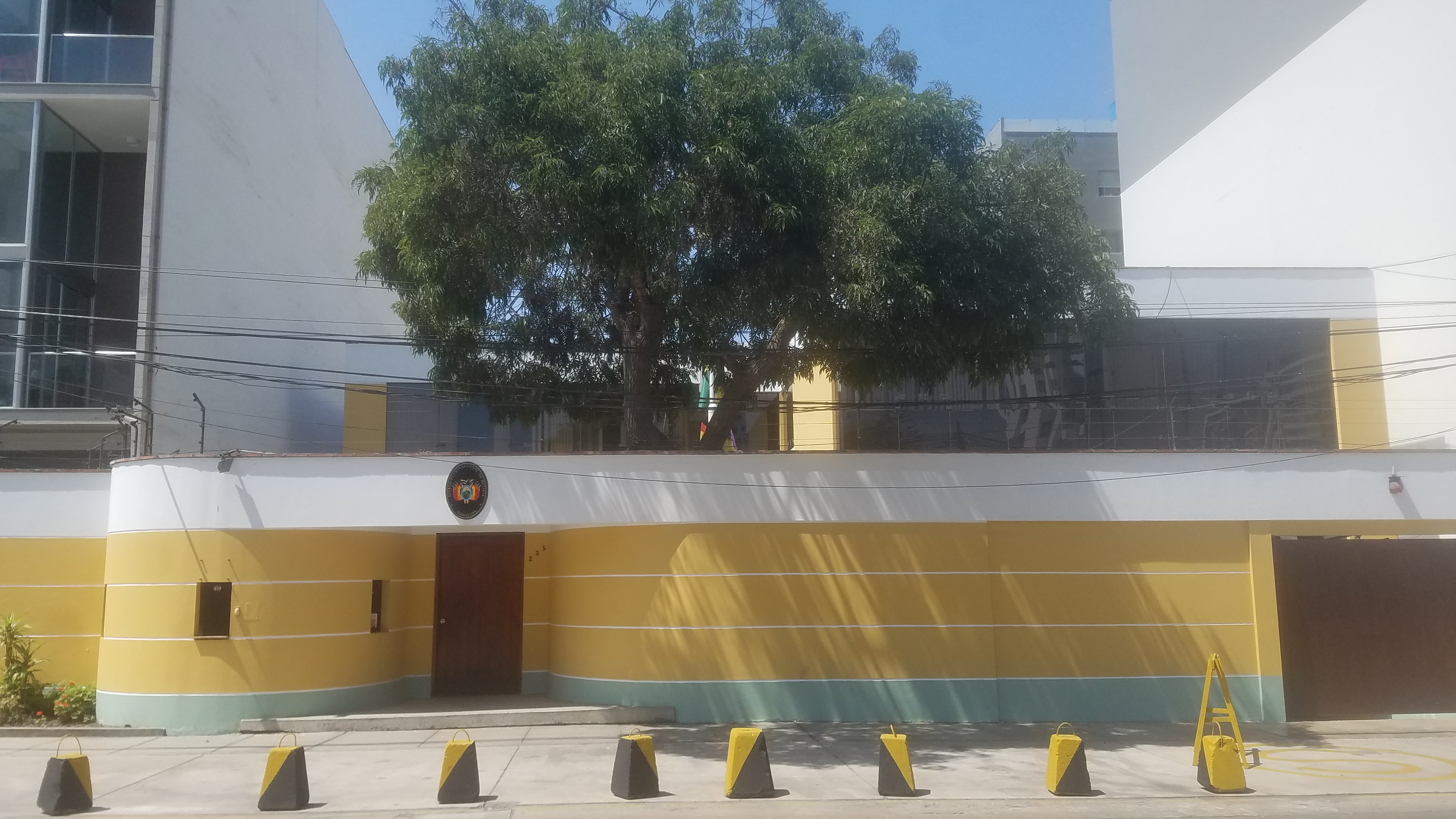
- The current embassy in 2023
- Location: San Isidro District, Lima, Peru
- Date: July 22, 1992
- Target: Embassy of Bolivia in Peru and bolivians
- Attack type: Car bomb; Communist terrorism
- Deaths: 0
- Injuries: 5–16
- Perpetrator: Shining Path
- Motive: Anti-Bolivian sentiment

The 1992 Bolivian embassy attack in Lima was a terrorist attack carried out by the Shining Path on the Bolivian embassy in the city of Lima, Peru. The attack took place as part of an offensive policy of "armed general strike" by the Shining Path against the government of Alberto Fujimori. The attack left up to 16 people injured, including locals and Bolivian embassy personnel.

== Background ==
At the beginning of 1992, the Shining Path leadership planned an offensive to undermine national power and internationally degrade the image of Alberto Fujimori, who was due to attend the 2nd Ibero-American Summit in Madrid. By 1992, Fujimori already had bad relations with the majority of the international Hispanic community due to his heavy-handed policy and excesses in the repression of the communist insurgency.

== Attack ==
On July 22, a car bomb exploded around noon near the embassy, causing great material damage and six people to be injured, including Peruvian civilians and Bolivian embassy personnel. The Peruvian Foreign Ministry reported that the attack was part of Shining Path operations during its so-called "armed general strike".

== Aftermath ==
A Latin American diplomat, upon visiting the rubble of the embassy, expressed that "Lima gives the impression of being under the siege of a virtual civil war."

The government of the then Republic of Bolivia demanded compensation and reparations from the Peruvian government for the attack. Some time later, the Peruvian State agreed to the Bolivian requests. These conversations ended up giving rise to the commodate of Bolivia Mar in the department of Moquegua, a commercial enclave.

== See also ==
- Japanese embassy hostage crisis, which took place nearby
- Tarata bombing, which took place on the same year
