= Ylo =

Ylo or YLO may refer to:

- Naruo language (ISO 639:ylo), Loloish language cluster spoken by the Yi people of Yunnan, China
- Yellow Pages Limited (traded as TSX:YLO until 2012), Canadian directory company
- Ilo, Peru (sometimes Ylo in older sources), port city in Peru

== See also ==
- Ilo (disambiguation)
