= El Algarrobal =

Village in Moquegua, Peru

- Village
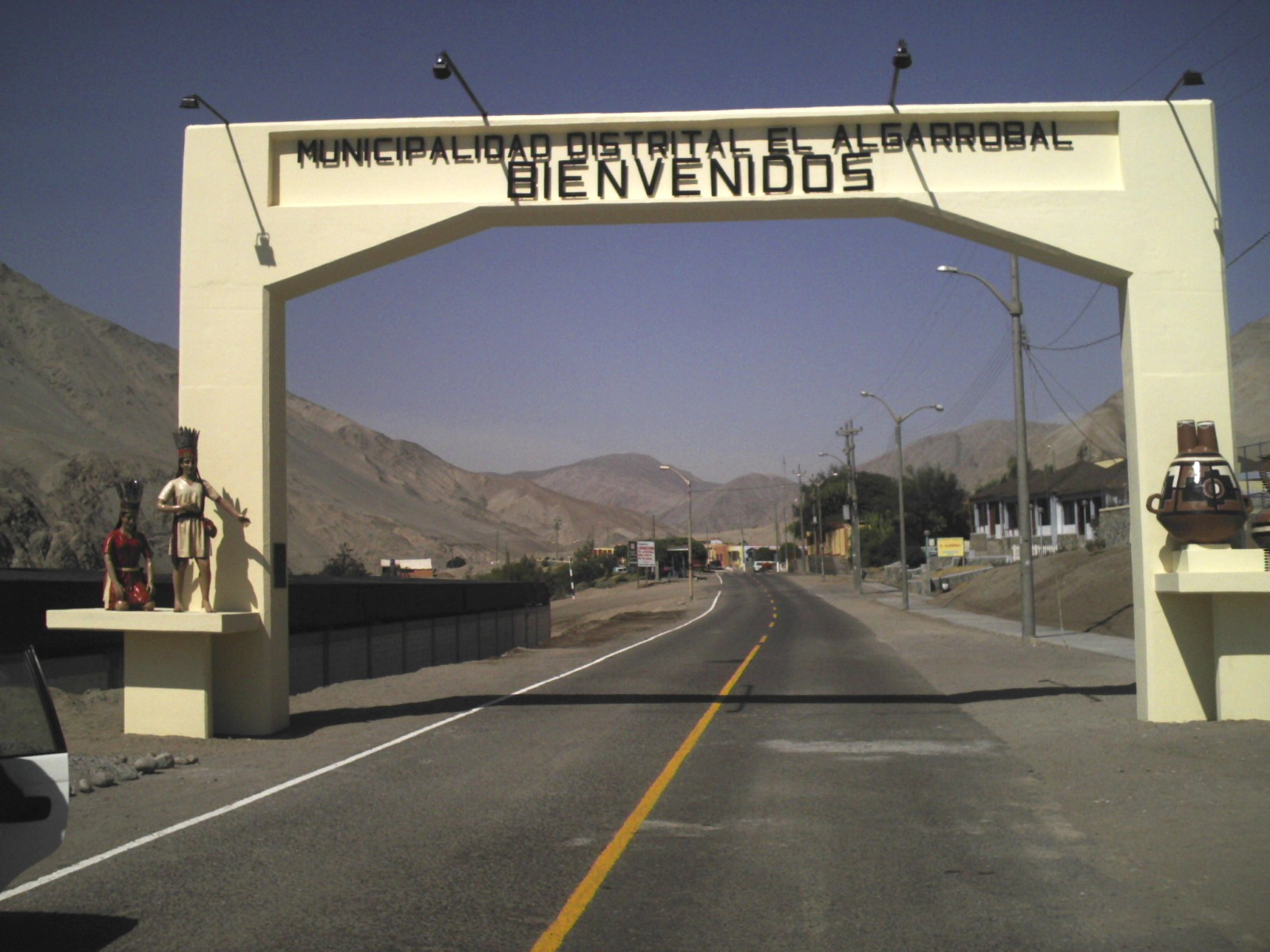
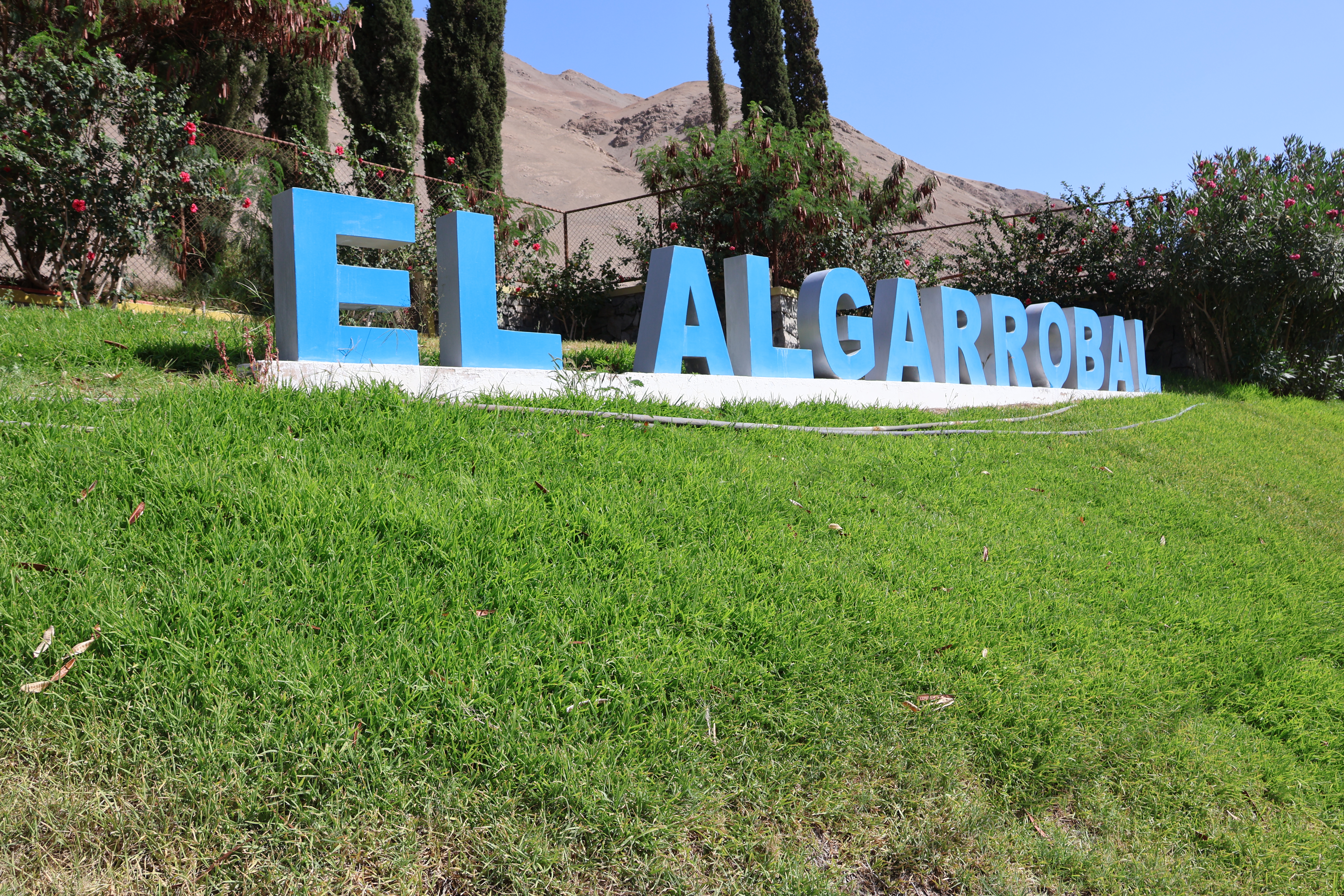

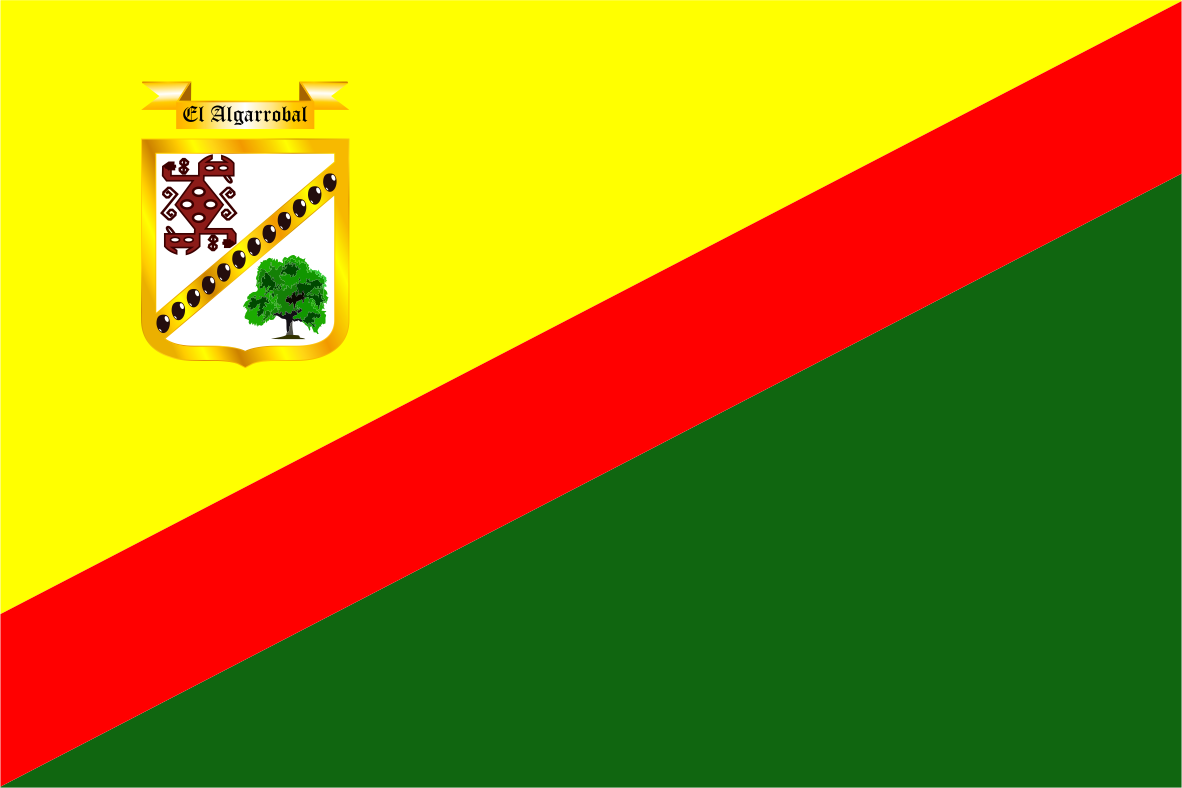
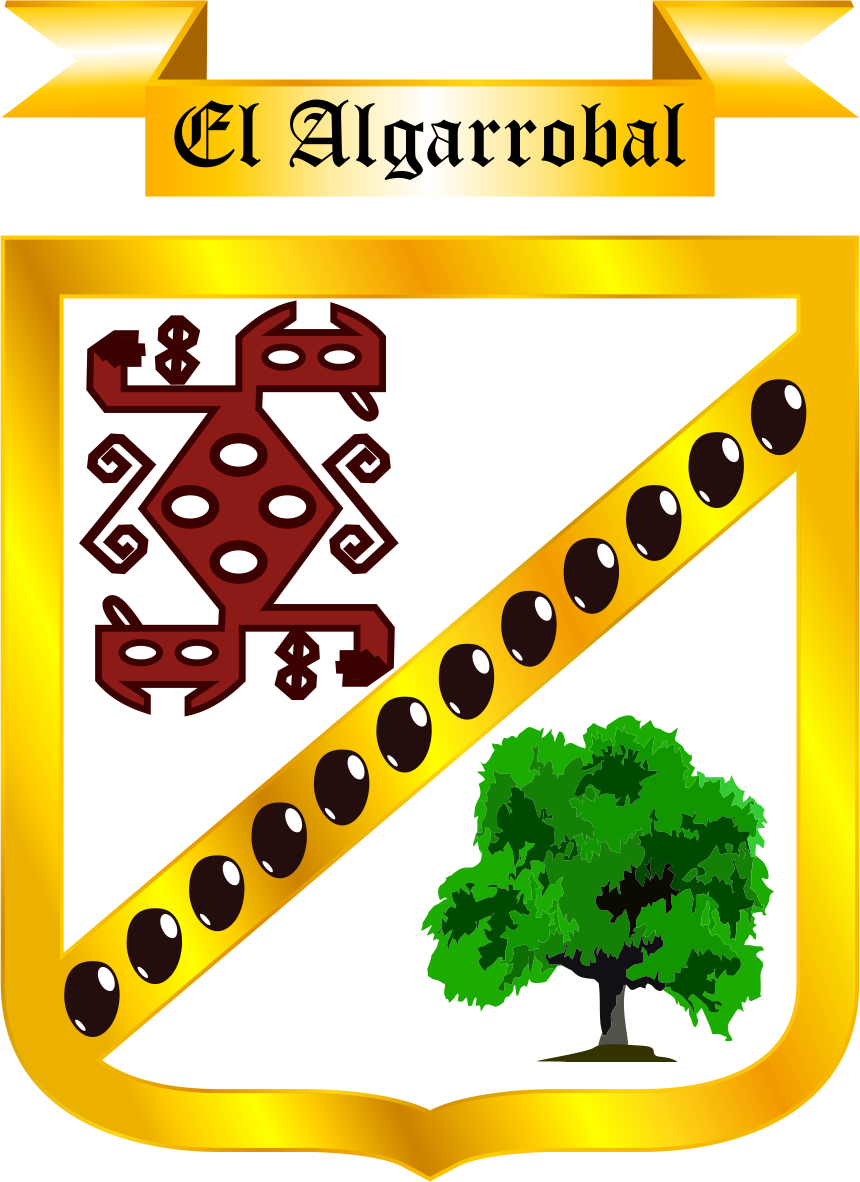
- Flag Coat of arms

- Location in Peru
- Coordinates: 17°37′S 71°19′W
- Country: Peru
- Region: Moquegua
- Province: Ilo
- District: El Algarrobal

Government
  - Mayor: Florentino Nina Fernandez

Population (2025)
  - Total: 5,523

El Algarrobal is a village in the Moquegua Region in Peru.

== Climate ==
Climate data for El Algarrobal, elevation 60 m (200 ft), (1991–2020)
| Month | Jan | Feb | Mar | Apr | May | Jun | Jul | Aug | Sep | Oct | Nov | Dec | Year |
|---|---|---|---|---|---|---|---|---|---|---|---|---|---|
| Mean daily maximum °C (°F) | 30.1 (86.2) | 31.3 (88.3) | 30.3 (86.5) | 27.8 (82.0) | 25.0 (77.0) | 22.6 (72.7) | 21.3 (70.3) | 21.1 (70.0) | 21.8 (71.2) | 23.5 (74.3) | 25.8 (78.4) | 28.0 (82.4) | 25.7 (78.3) |
| Mean daily minimum °C (°F) | 18.9 (66.0) | 19.3 (66.7) | 18.1 (64.6) | 16.0 (60.8) | 14.4 (57.9) | 13.2 (55.8) | 12.7 (54.9) | 12.6 (54.7) | 13.4 (56.1) | 14.5 (58.1) | 15.7 (60.3) | 17.2 (63.0) | 15.5 (59.9) |
| Average precipitation mm (inches) | 0.3 (0.01) | 0.2 (0.01) | 0.1 (0.00) | 0.0 (0.0) | 0.1 (0.00) | 0.0 (0.0) | 0.3 (0.01) | 0.1 (0.00) | 0.1 (0.00) | 0.0 (0.0) | 0.0 (0.0) | 0.0 (0.0) | 1.2 (0.03) |
Source: National Meteorology and Hydrology Service of Peru
