= Pacocha District =

Coordinates: 17.6116°S 71.3402°W

Pacocha
- District
- Interactive map of Pacocha
- Country: Peru
- Region: Moquegua
- Province: Ilo
- Founded: May 26, 1970
- Capital: Pueblo Nuevo

Government
  - Mayor: Domingo Arturo Aragon Cornejo

Area
  - Total: 338.08 km^{2} (130.53 sq mi)
- Elevation: 5 m (16 ft)

Population (2005 census)
  - Total: 4,986
  - Density: 14.75/km^{2} (38.20/sq mi)
- Time zone: UTC-5 (PET)
- UBIGEO: 180303
- Website: munipacocha.gob.pe

Pacocha District is one of three districts of the province Ilo in Peru.
