= El Algarrobal District =

Coordinates: 17.6229°S 71.2684°W

El Algarrobal
- District
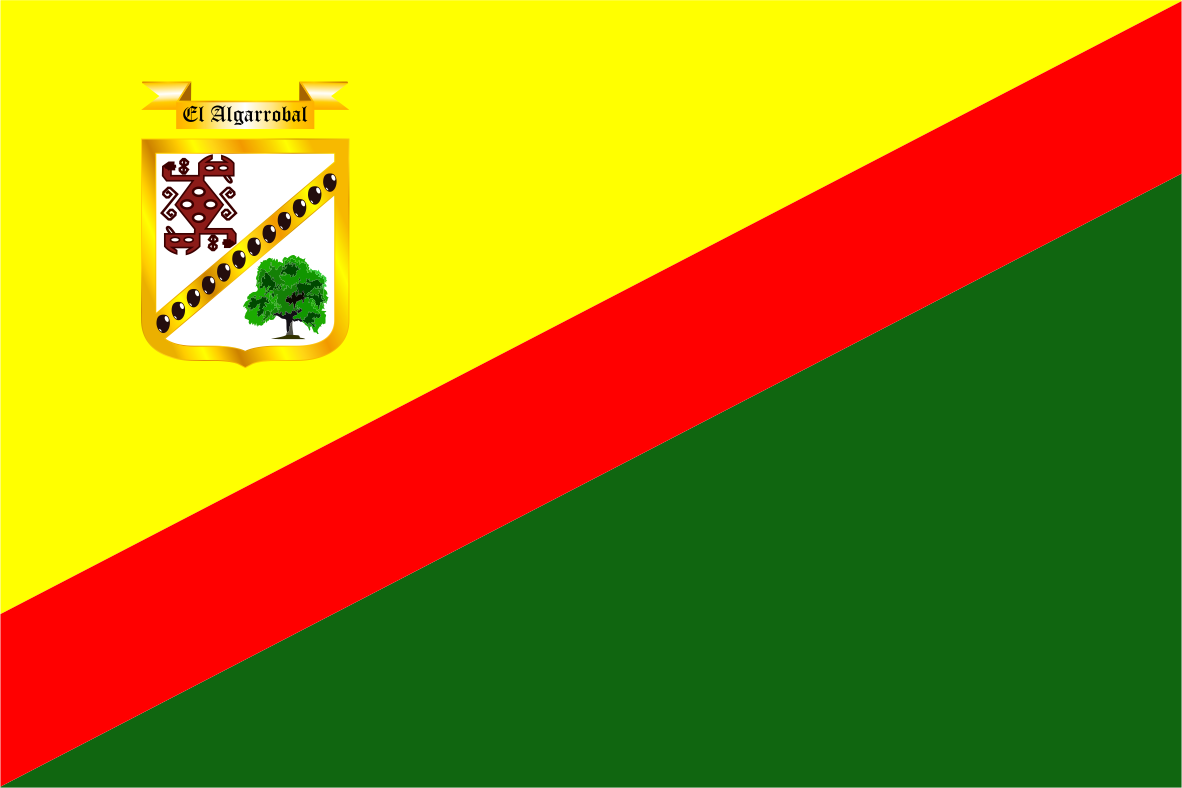
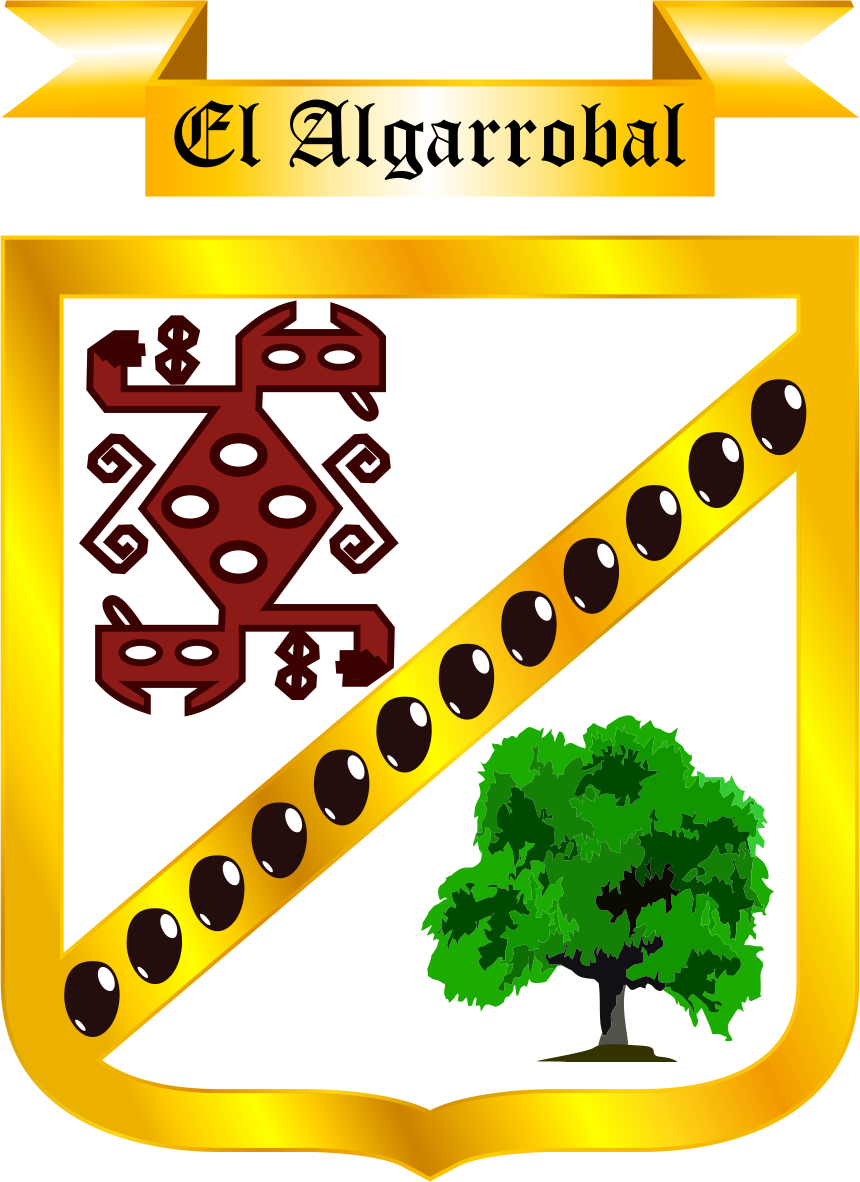
- Flag Coat of arms
- Interactive map of El Algarrobal
- Country: Peru
- Region: Moquegua
- Province: Ilo
- Founded: May 26, 1970
- Capital: El Algarrobal

Government
  - Mayor: Elva Catalina Valdivia Davila

Area
  - Total: 747 km^{2} (288 sq mi)
- Elevation: 110 m (360 ft)

Population (2005 census)
  - Total: 305
  - Density: 0.408/km^{2} (1.06/sq mi)
- Time zone: UTC-5 (PET)
- UBIGEO: 180302

El Algarrobal District is one of three districts of the province Ilo in Peru.

== Climate ==
Climate data for El Algarrobal, elevation 60 m (200 ft), (1991–2020)
Month	Jan	Feb	Mar	Apr	May	Jun	Jul	Aug	Sep	Oct	Nov	Dec	Year
Mean daily maximum °C (°F)	30.1 (86.2)	31.3 (88.3)	30.3 (86.5)	27.8 (82.0)	25.0 (77.0)	22.6 (72.7)	21.3 (70.3)	21.1 (70.0)	21.8 (71.2)	23.5 (74.3)	25.8 (78.4)	28.0 (82.4)	25.7 (78.3)
Mean daily minimum °C (°F)	18.9 (66.0)	19.3 (66.7)	18.1 (64.6)	16.0 (60.8)	14.4 (57.9)	13.2 (55.8)	12.7 (54.9)	12.6 (54.7)	13.4 (56.1)	14.5 (58.1)	15.7 (60.3)	17.2 (63.0)	15.5 (59.9)
Average precipitation mm (inches)	0.3 (0.01)	0.2 (0.01)	0.1 (0.00)	0.0 (0.0)	0.1 (0.00)	0.0 (0.0)	0.3 (0.01)	0.1 (0.00)	0.1 (0.00)	0.0 (0.0)	0.0 (0.0)	0.0 (0.0)	1.2 (0.03)
Source: National Meteorology and Hydrology Service of Peru
