= Pichilemu Aerodrome =

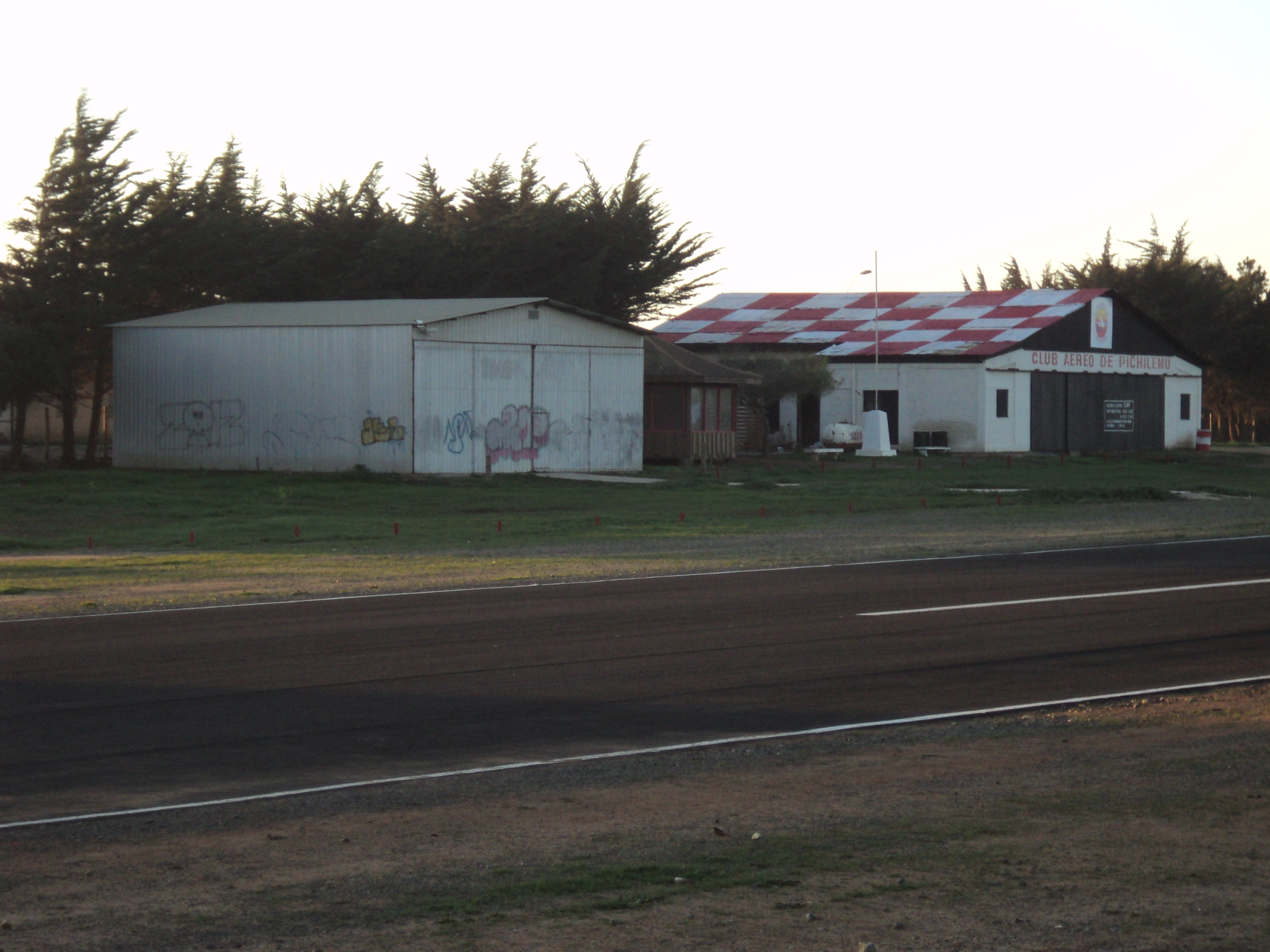
- IATA: none; ICAO: SCPM

Summary
- Airport type: Public
- Owner: Municipality of Pichilemu
- Location: Pichilemu, Chile
- Elevation AMSL: 82 ft / 25 m
- Coordinates: 34°23′40″S 72°01′06″W

Map
- Location of the airport in Chile

Runways
Direction	Length		Surface
Direction	m	ft	Surface
04/22	590	1,936	Asphalt
- Source: Aerodromo.cl GCM

Pichilemu Airport (Spanish: Aeródromo de Pichilemu) (ICAO: SCPM) is an airport serving Pichilemu, a Pacific coastal city in the O'Higgins Region of Chile. It is one of the oldest airports in the region.

It is currently owned by Club Aéreo de Pichilemu, on loan from the Municipality of Pichilemu as a commodate. It is used on certain occasions for events such as Presidential visits, and for emergency landings.

The Ministry of Public Works of Chile invested more than 300 million pesos (about US$750,000) to pave the 12,000 m^{2} (3.0 acres) dirt runway, and it was inaugurated on 10 September 2011.

The runway is within the city, less than 1 kilometre (0.6 mi) inland from the Pacific shore. The length does not include an additional 100 metres (330 ft) displaced threshold on Runway 04.

== See also ==
- Transport in Chile
- List of airports in Chile
