= Francesco Petrozzi =

Peruvian lyric tenor and politician (1961–2024)

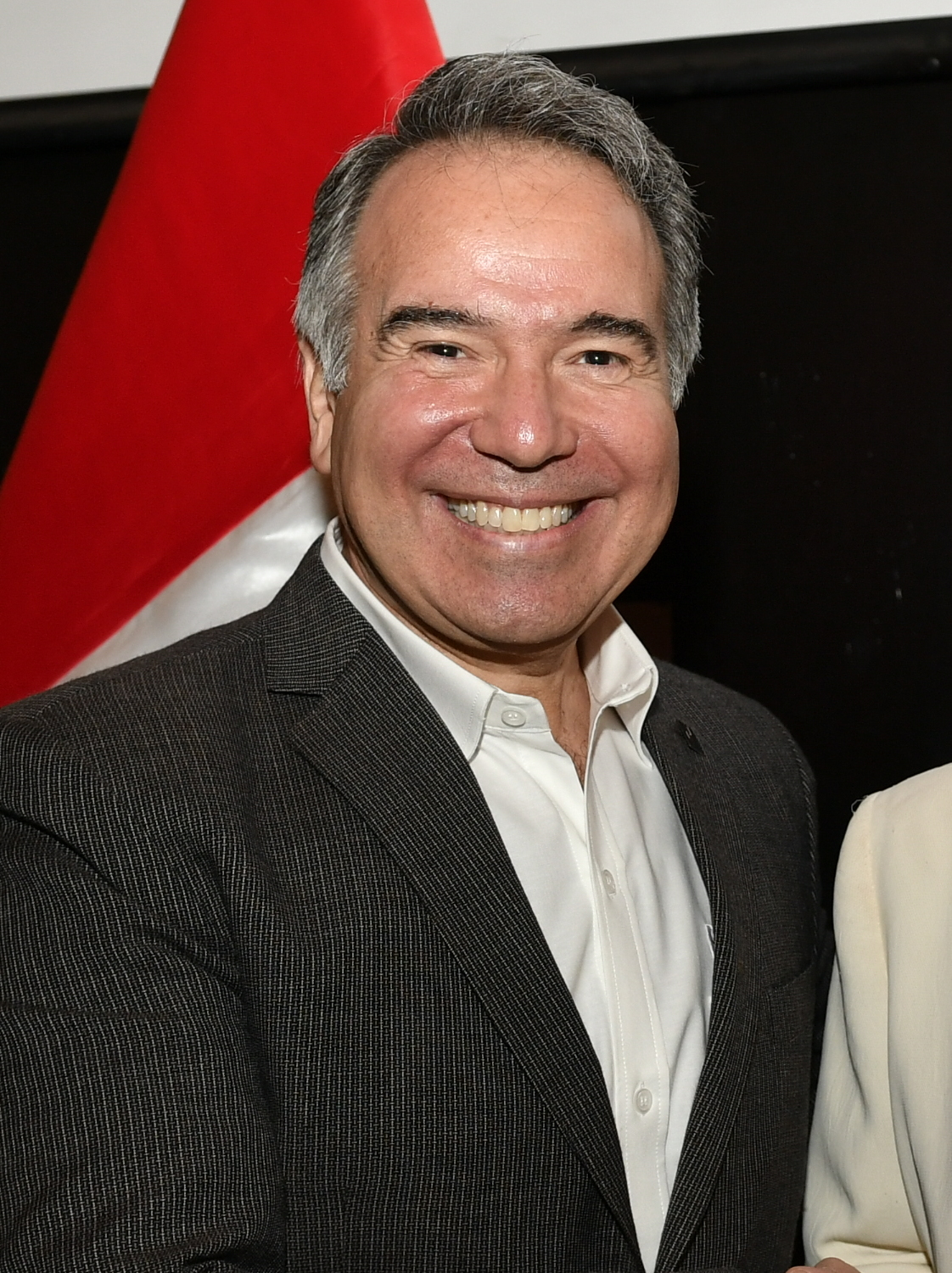
- Petrozzi in 2019

Member of Congress
- In office 27 July 2016 – 30 September 2019

Minister of Culture
- In office 3 October 2019 – 4 December 2019
- President: Martín Vizcarra
- Prime Minister: Vicente Zeballos
- Preceded by: Luis Castillo Butters
- Succeeded by: Sonia Guillén

Personal details
- Born: 13 December 1961
- Died: 27 May 2024 (aged 62)
- Party: Popular Force; Alliance for Progress

Francesco Petrozzi (13 December 1961 – 27 May 2024) was a Peruvian lyric tenor and politician. He represented Peru at the OTI Festival 1986 with the song "Aprenderé". He served as minister of culture of Peru in 2019.

Petrozzi died on 27 May 2024, at the age of 62.
