= Chiribaya culture =

Archaeological culture in Peru

Chiribaya
- c. 900–c. 1450
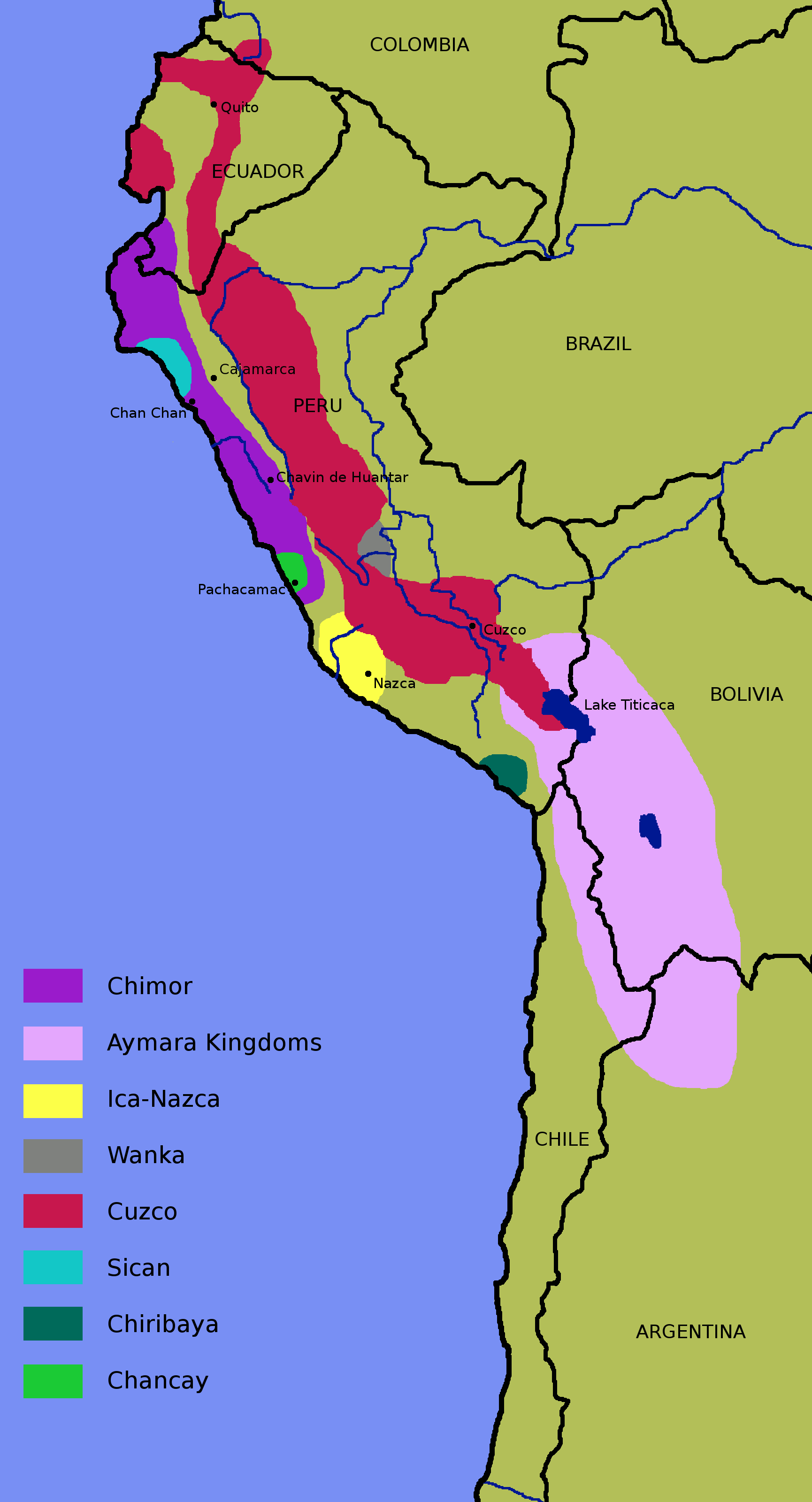
- Extent of the Chiribaya culture in the middle of the 15th century.
- Location: Atacama Desert
- Official languages: Puquina
- Historical era: Late Intermediate
  - Established: c. 900
  - Disestablished: c. 1450
Preceded by	Succeeded by
Wari Empire	Inca Empire

The Chiribaya culture flourished near the coast of southern Peru and adjacent Chile from 700 CE until Spanish settlement in the late 16th century. The classic phase of the Chiribaya culture was from 1000 CE until 1360 CE. The Chiribaya culture consisted of both maritime settlements along 220 kilometres (140 mi) of the Pacific Ocean coast and agricultural settlements inland in valleys of the Osmore and Tambo rivers in Peru and the Lluta river and Azapa Valley in Chile.

The lower Osmore valley, one of the centers of the Chiribaya culture, has been extensively studied by archaeologists because it appears to have been colonized by both the Wari and Tihuanco empires and the later Lupaca people and the Inca Empire. These highland empires relied on the lower-altitude valleys to supply them with agricultural products such as maize and chile peppers.

== Environment ==
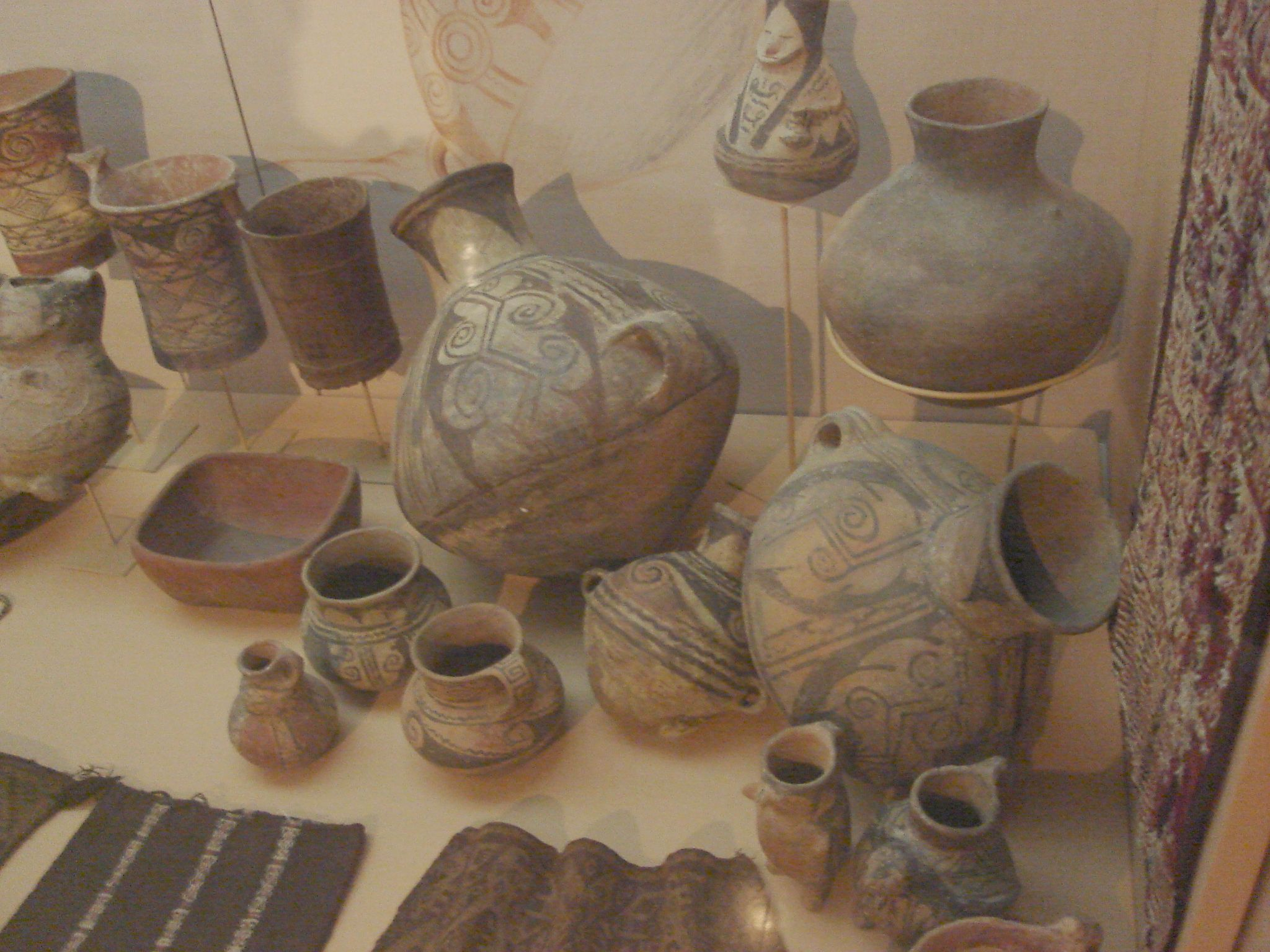
Chiribaya pottery in the Arica (Chile) museum.

The people of the Chiribaya culture lived near the Pacific Ocean in the Atacama Desert which is commonly known as the driest non-polar place in the world., The total annual precipitation at Ilo, Peru, at the mouth of the Osmore River is .1 inches (2.5 mm). Agriculture is only possible where water from the rivers and a few springs is available for irrigation. The four rivers in the territory of the Chiribaya culture and their tributaries rise about 130 kilometres (81 mi) inland in the wetter Andes at elevations of up to 5,000 metres (16,000 ft). The cold Humboldt Current offshore creates one of the world's richest marine ecosystems and supports large numbers of fish, marine mammals, and birds.

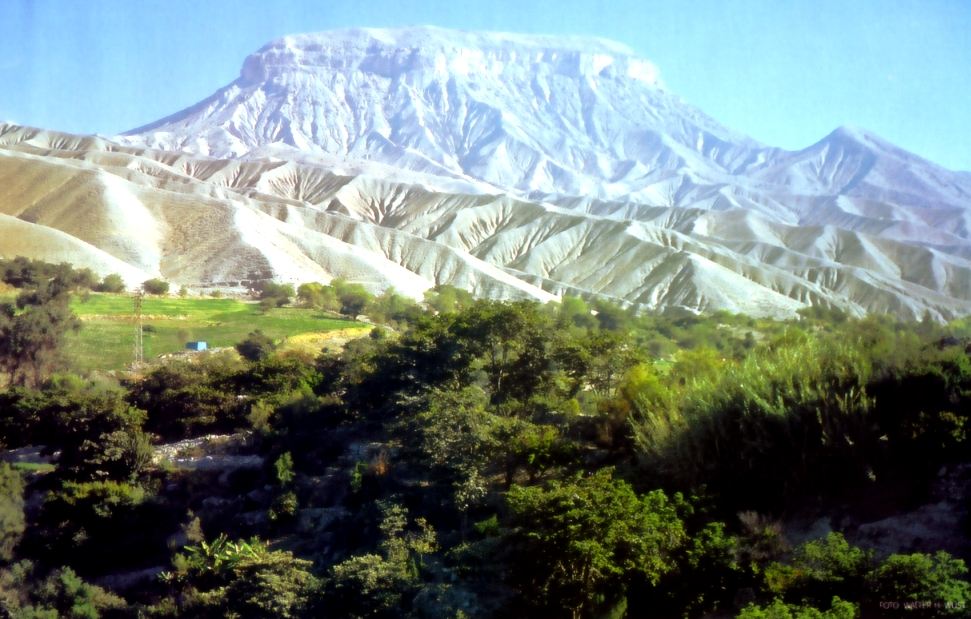
Cerro Baúl, the archaeological site is located on the flat top of a mountain in the Osmore River valley.

Chiribaya inland sites are usually located along rivers, which provide water for agricultural production, although the amount of suitable land was limited both by the steepness of the terrain and, near the ocean, by limited quantities of water for irrigation. Camelid pastoralism was also an important means of subsistence and for production of textiles.

== Antecedents ==
Evidence of man's presence in what would become the Chiribaya cultural area dates back to before 7,000 BCE with the Chinchorro culture, the people of which practiced mummification thousands of years before Egypt did. These early inhabitants lived on the coast and 89 percent of their subsistence came from the sea; only 6 percent came from terrestrial vegetation and 5 percent from terrestrial meat. The Chinchorro culture ended about 1100 BCE. From about 400 BCE to 300 CE, the Huaracane culture introduced agriculture to inland areas of the Osmore River region. In the centuries which followed, the area was influenced by the Wari and Tihuanacan empires who founded colonies in the Osmore valley.

== Description ==
Rather than being a unified state under a single government, the Chiribaya area is often described as a señorío, a collection of loosely affiliated communities each headed by a local leader and resembling the manors of medieval Europe.

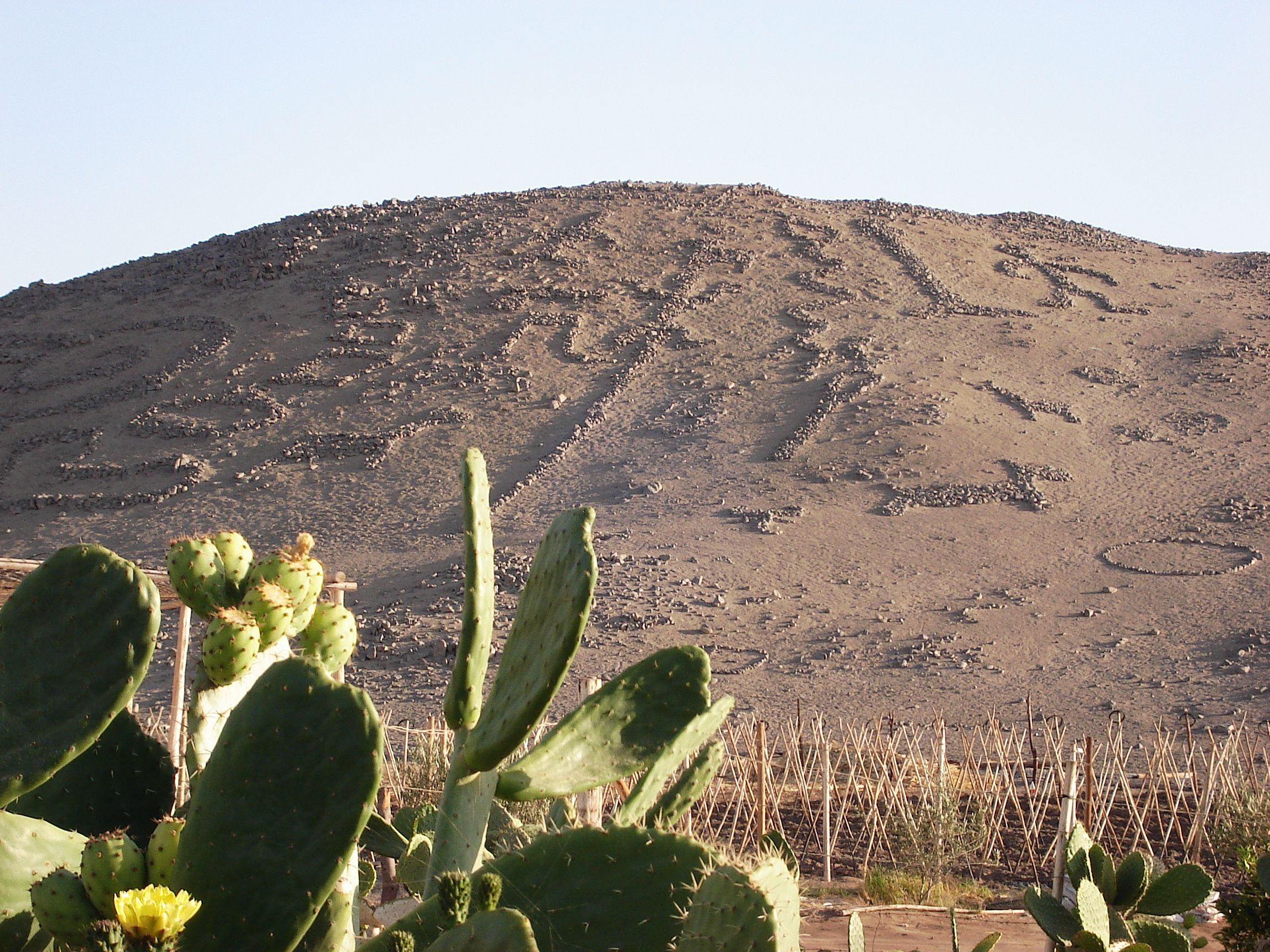
Cerro Sagrado (Sacred Mountain) in the Azapa valley of Chile features a large number of geoglyphs.

The Chiribaya culture is most often discussed for its relationship with "verticality"' -- the practice by pre-historic cultures of establishing zones of economic specialization at different altitudes to produce a wide variety of food and industrial crops. High altitude Andean cultures and civilizations established colonies at lower elevations near the Pacific Coast or in the Amazon River basin. The colonies were often not contiguous with the highland homes of the cultures, but sovereignty of the homeland over the distant colonies was retained. In the Osmore river valley, and probably in the other river valleys, there were two principal zones. The coast was inhabited by "pescadores" (fisherman); and the upland area a few miles inland mostly at elevations of 1,000 metres (3,300 ft) to 2,000 metres (6,600 ft) was inhabited by "labradores" (farmers) who primarily grew maize and chili peppers. The two zones traded products with each other and supplied the high altitude cultures. Llamas and alpacas were raised in both zones, probably being more important in the inland areas as the property of the cultural elites.

The fishermen living near the coast also practiced limited agriculture and pastoralism at the mouth of rivers and in the lomas (fog-oases) known to have existed near the coast both north and south of the city of Ilo.

However, verticality and the establishment of colonies by highland peoples may vary on a case to case basis. Genetic studies indicates that the Chiribaya people of the lower Osmore River Valley and nearby coast were likely intrusive— descendants in part of Wari and Tiwanaku colonists—while the Chiribaya of the Azapa Valley of Chile were more likely to be the descendants of the ancient Chinchorro culture that flourished in the same area. This suggests that the highland cultures had little direct contact with the inhabitants of the Azapa valley.

== Demise ==
About 1360 CE, an uncharacteristic flood, probably caused by the El Niño Southern Oscillation, destroyed the irrigation systems and many settlements in the Osmore valley. The area was depopulated and many of the extensive irrigation works were not repaired until the arrival of Spanish colonists in the late 16th century. The Chiribaya people were probably absorbed by the Estuquiña people who lived in the upper Osmore valley. The area was also probably colonized—or came under the political control—of the Lupaca from the Lake Titicaca area and by the Incas in the 15th and early 16th century.

== Chiribaya dogs ==
In 2006, archaeologists found the mummified remains of 43 dogs in a Chiribaya cemetery near Ilo. Some were buried with blankets and food. The dogs were used to herd llamas. Peruvian authorities are attempting to get international recognition of present-day Chiribaya shepherd dogs, which resemble a small Golden Retriever, as a unique breed.
