= Commodate =

A commodate (Latin: commodatum), also known as loan for use, in civil law and Scots Law is a gratuitous loan; a loan, or free concession of anything moveable or immoveable, for a certain timeframe, on condition of restoring again the same individual after a certain time.

It is a kind of loan, or contract, with one difference: the commodate is gratis, and does not transfer the property; the thing must be returned in essence, and without deterioration, so that things which consume by use, or time, cannot be objects of a commodate, but of a loan, because although they may be returned in kind, they cannot in identity.
