= Ilo District =

Coordinates: 17.6475°S 71.3398°W

Ilo
- District
- Flag Coat of arms
- Interactive map of Ilo
- Country: Peru
- Region: Moquegua
- Province: Ilo
- Capital: Ilo

Government
  - Mayor: Gerardo Felipe Carpio Díaz (2019-2022)

Area
  - Total: 295.6 km^{2} (114.1 sq mi)
- Elevation: 15 m (49 ft)

Population (2005 census)
  - Total: 57,746
  - Density: 195.4/km^{2} (506.0/sq mi)
- Time zone: UTC-5 (PET)
- UBIGEO: 180301

Ilo District is one of three districts of the province Ilo in Peru.

Mayor: Gerardo Felipe Carpio Díaz (2019-2022)

== See also ==
- Administrative divisions of Peru
