= Ilo province =

Coordinates: 17°38′S 71°20′W

Ilo
- Province
- Flag Coat of arms

- Location of Ilo in the Moquegua Region
- Country: Peru
- Region: Moquegua
- Founded: May 26, 1970
- Capital: Ilo

Government
  - Mayor: Gerardo Felipe Carpio Díaz (2019-2022)

Area
  - Total: 1,380.68 km^{2} (533.08 sq mi)
- Elevation: 15 m (49 ft)

Population
  - Total: 74 649
  - Density: 54.09/km^{2} (140.1/sq mi)
- UBIGEO: 1803

Ilo is one of three provinces that make up the Moquegua Region in Peru. The province is the largest mining center in all of southern Peru.

== Geography ==
The province borders the province of Mariscal Nieto to the north, the province of Jorge Basadre to the east and southeast, the Pacific Ocean to the south and west, and the province of Islay to the northwest.

It extends north–south through the region's coastal area, forming a bay.

== Demographics ==
=== Population ===
According to the 1993 Census, the province has a population of 51,481 inhabitants, 52.4% of whom (26,964) are male and 47.6% (24,517) are female.

As of 2005, the Instituto Nacional de Estadística e Informática estimates the province's population to be 68,363.

=== Languages ===
Spanish is spoken at home by 82% of the population; while others speak Aymara (10.6%), Quechua (6.1%), other indigenous languages (0.1%) and foreign languages (0.3%).

=== Immigration ===
Persons originating from other regions of the country make up 51.6% of the population and 0.3% of residents were born abroad.

The largest immigrant groups come from the Puno Region (17.4% of the total population) and the Arequipa Region (15.3%).

=== Age ===
The age distribution is

- 42.4% under the age of 20,
- 10.9% from 20 to 24,
- 31.2% from 25 to 44,
- 12.9% from 45 to 64, and
- 2.6% who are 65 years of age or older.

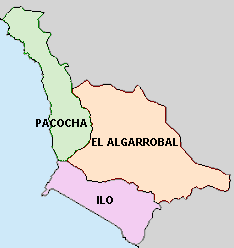
Map of the province showing its districts.

== Political division ==
The province of Ilo is divided into three districts (Spanish: distritos, singular: distrito), each of which is headed by a mayor (alcalde). The districts, with their capitals in parentheses, are:

- El Algarrobal (El Algarrobal)
- Ilo (Ilo)
- Pacocha (Pueblo Nuevo)

== See also ==
- Administrative divisions of Peru
