= Ilo, Peru =

Ilo
- City
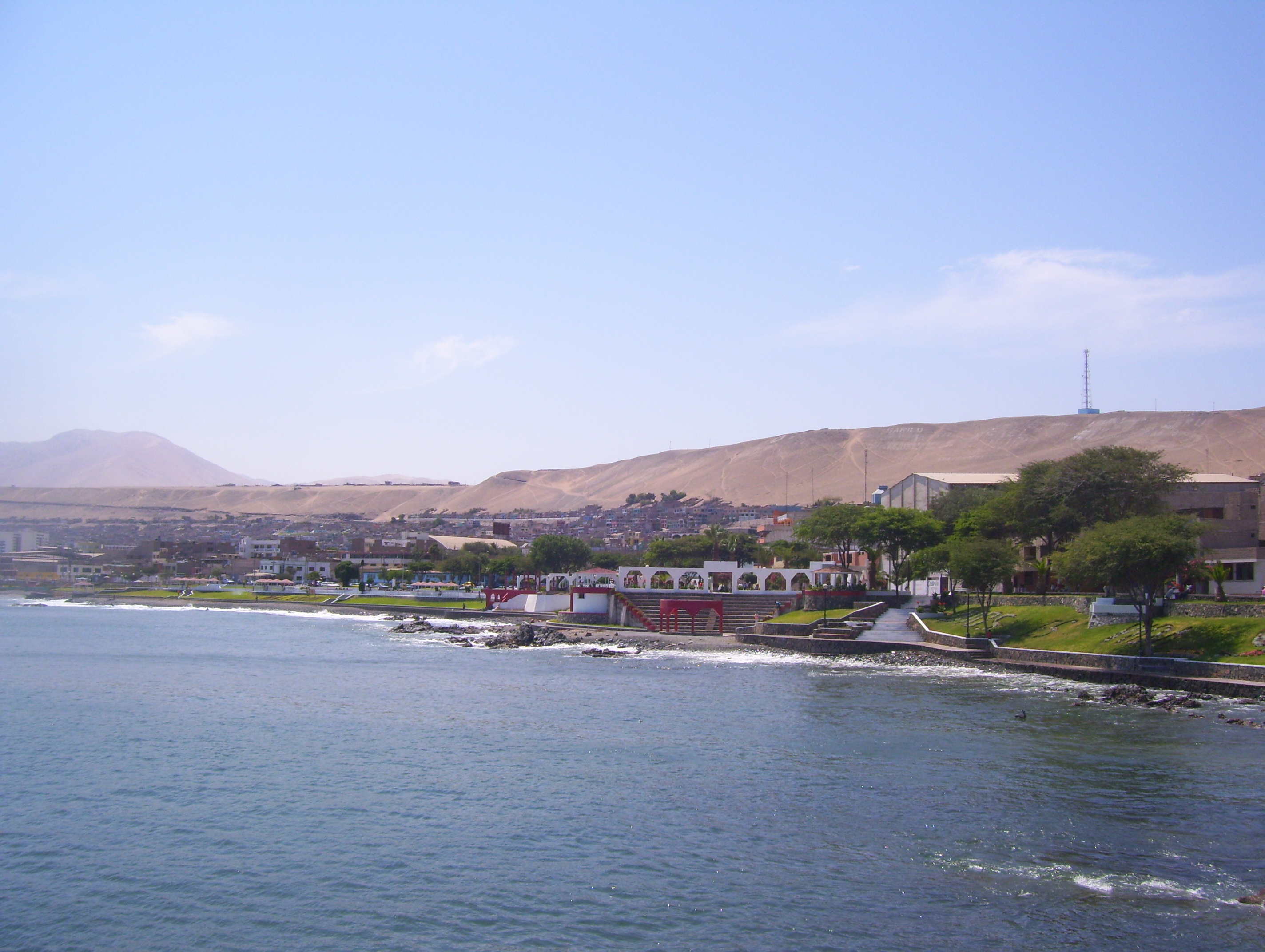
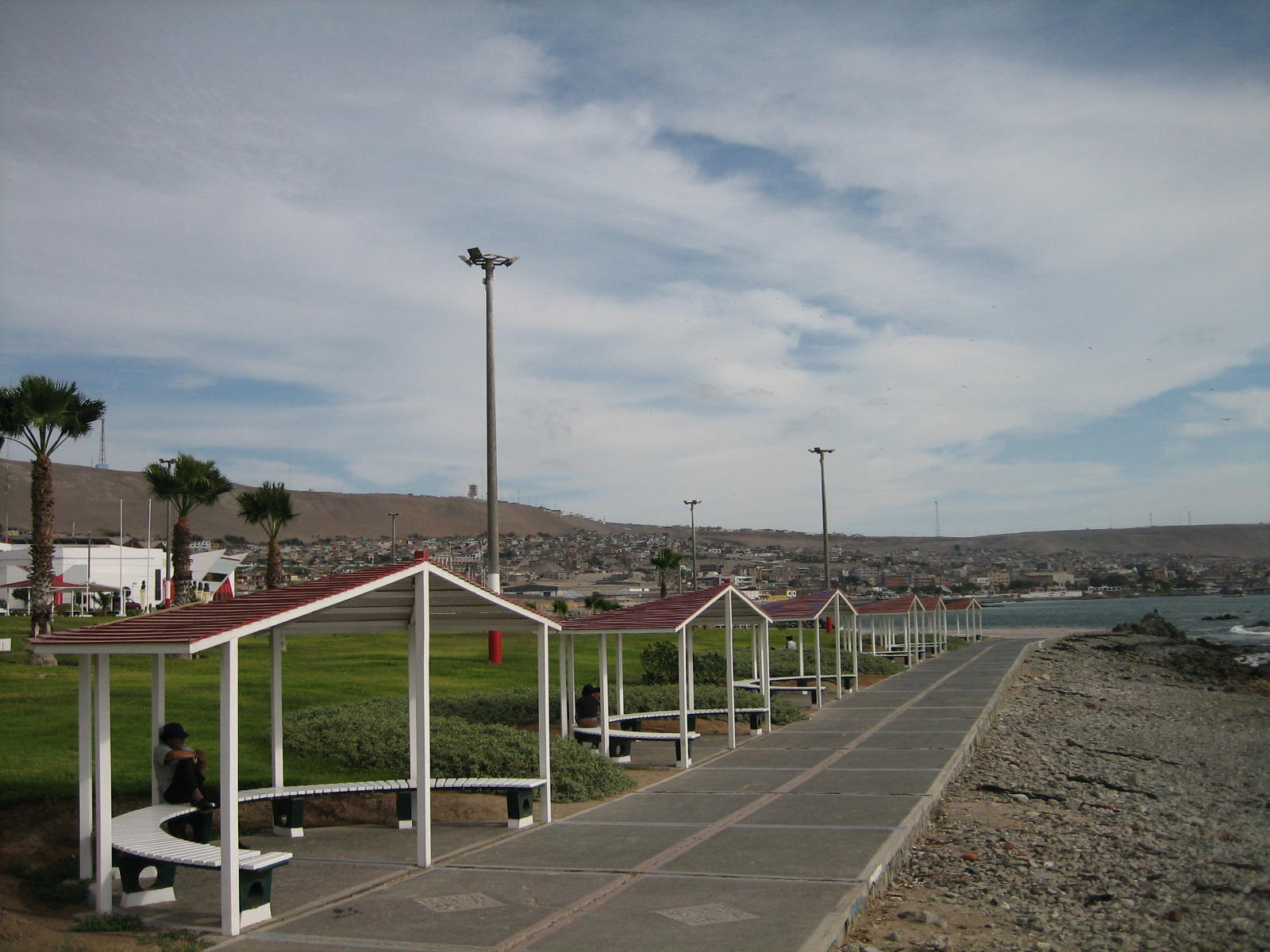
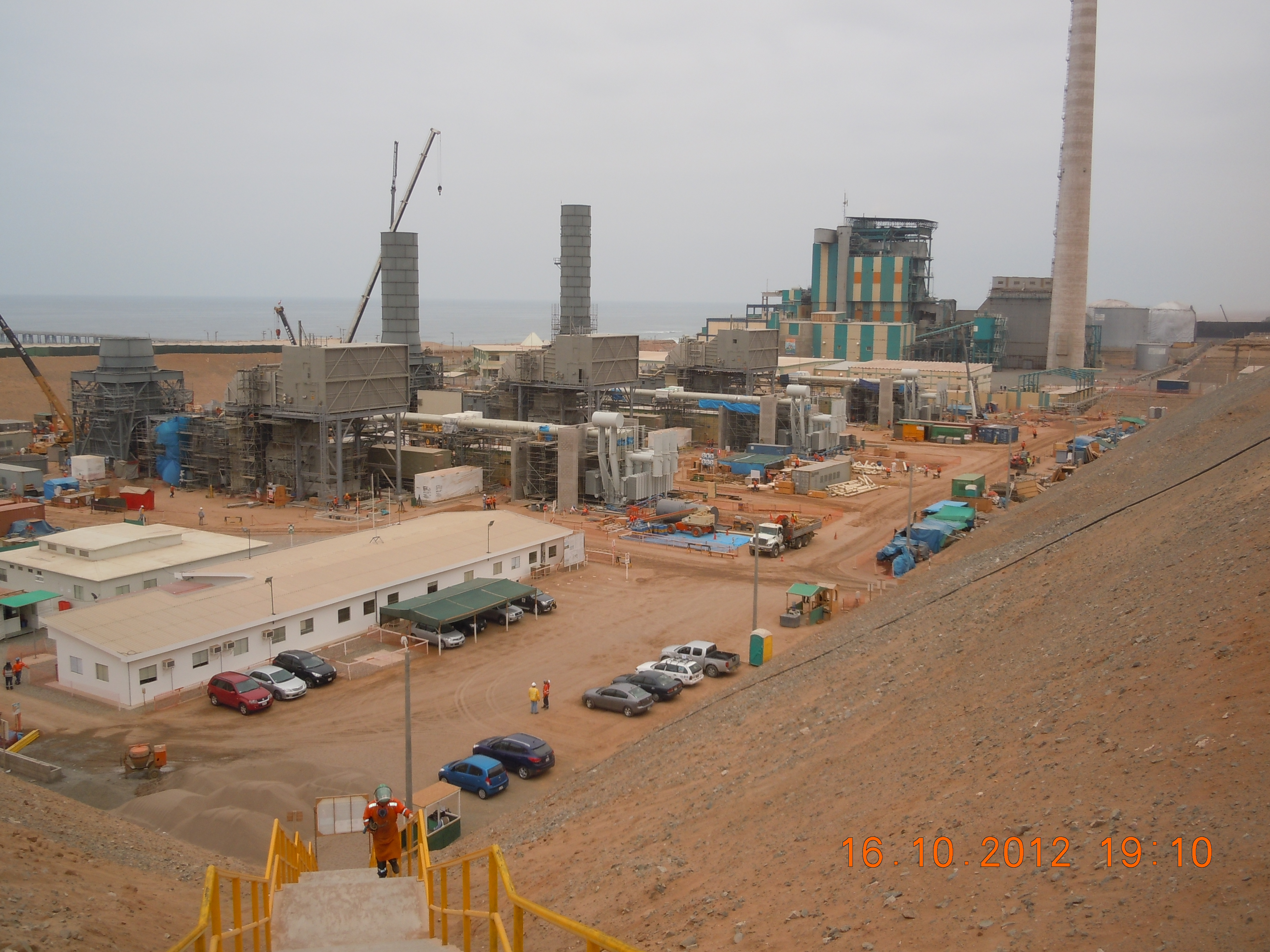
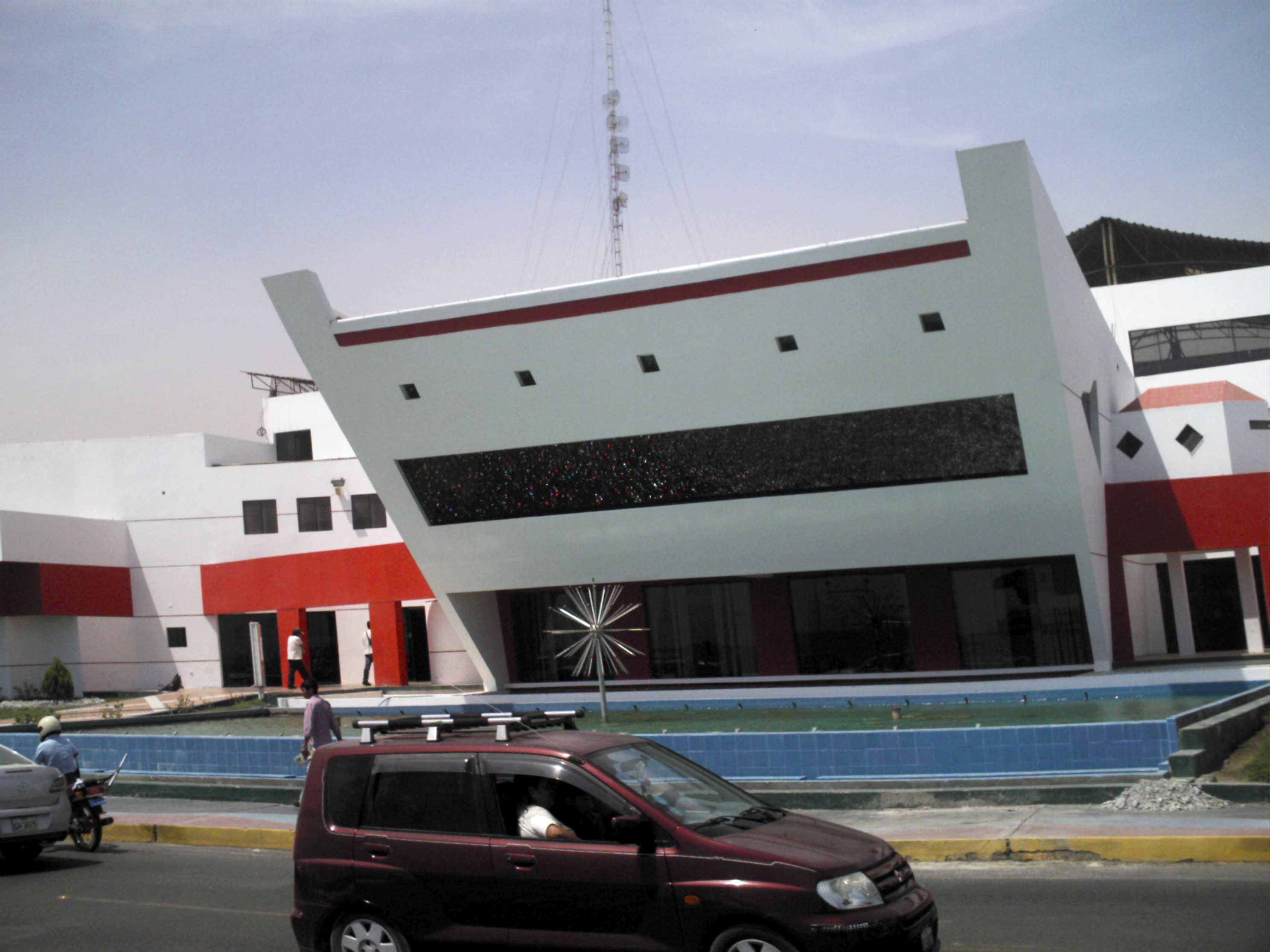
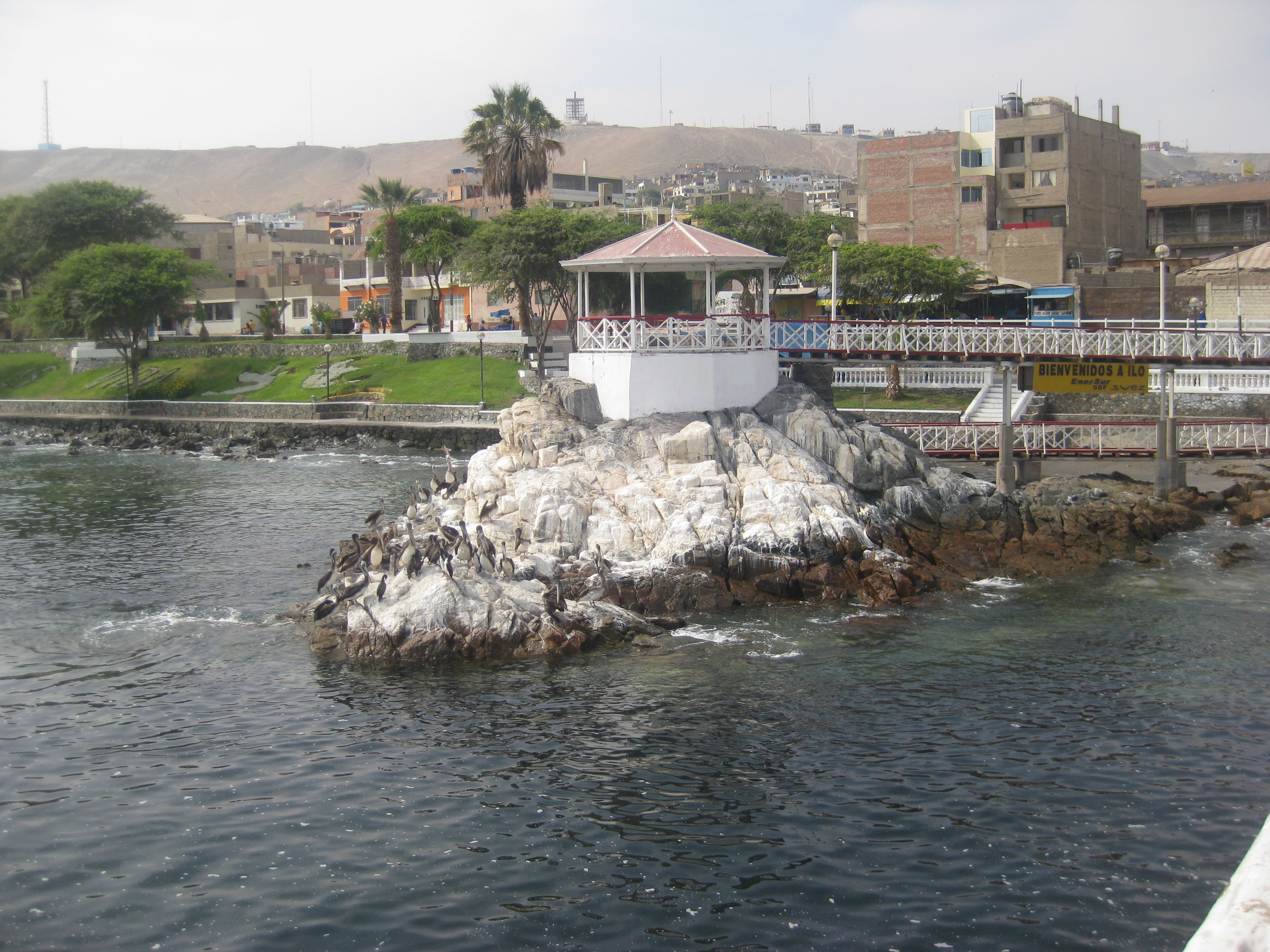
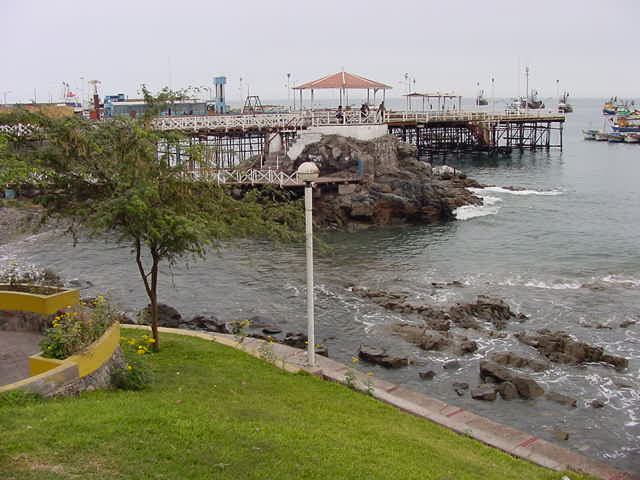

- Flag Seal

- Location within Peru
- Coordinates: 17°38′45.09″S 71°20′43.13″W
- Country: Peru
- Region: Moquegua
- Province: Ilo
- District: Ilo

Government
  - Mayor: Humberto Jesus Tapia Garay

Area
  - Total: 295.6 km^{2} (114.1 sq mi)
- Elevation: 15 m (49 ft)

Population (2025)
  - Total: 69,376
  - Density: 234.7/km^{2} (607.9/sq mi)
- Demonym: Ileños
- Postal code: 18601
- Website: Official website

Ilo (Note: Sometimes Ylo or Hilo in older sources) is a port city in southern Peru, with 69,376 inhabitants. It is the second largest city in the Moquegua Region and capital of the Ilo Province.

== History ==
Before the arrival of the Spanish in the 16th century, the area was populated by the people of the Chiribaya culture. The Conquistadores were given land grants by Charles V and brought olives to this area. Olive agriculture was the main crop and source of work until the early 20th century. A small settlement, Pacocha, was established by the seashore where the Osmore River (Rio Osmore) flows into the Pacific Ocean. High tides in the late 19th century flooded Pacocha and the population moved to Ilo's actual location, adopting its current name. Until the beginning of the 20th century most of the people lived along the banks of the Rio Osmore, whose waters flow sporadically during the summer months. Ilo was a port of call to the ships travelling from the east to the west coast of the United States via Tierra del Fuego. After the building of a pier in the 19th century, international trade flourished in the region. Italians, Chinese, Japanese and Germans settled in Ilo during this time. However, the building of the Transcontinental Rail Road and the Panama Canal caused commercial activities to decrease and mostly steamships transporting goods between Peruvian and Chilean ports remained. The Battle of Pacocha took place near Ilo.

Along with its pier, a railroad was built to connect Ilo to Moquegua. The railroad was named after Calamazo (Spanish pronunciation of Kalamazoo, from the name stamped on the equipment used by the railroad). The main economic activities of the city include fishing and mining. Copper mines originally owned by the Southern Peru Copper Corporation (SPCC) have provided several jobs to the region. SPCC was established by the American Smelting and Mining Corporation in the middle of the 20th century. Many Americans and Peruvians working for SPCC live in an area of Ilo called Ciudad Nueva. The copper smelting plant and a formerly state-owned refinery located 10 kilometers far from the city have contributed to a large amount of air and water pollution in the region. Ilo's industry appeared in the Canadian documentary film The Corporation, as an example of environmental problems caused by industries. Local swimming areas include Pozo de Lisas, Monte Carlo and Puerto Ingles. Bolivia has in the past utilized Ilo as a free gate to the ocean for both recreational and trade purposes.

== Transport ==
In 1992 the Peruvian government granted a 99-year lease to the government of landlocked Bolivia to develop a port facility, in effect allowing Bolivia to claim to be a "Pacific Ocean nation". Bolivia lost its territory on the Pacific coast following the War of the Pacific with Chile in the 19th century. A new metre gauge railway through Bolivia to Brazil is also proposed.

== Climate ==
Temperatures in Ilo range between 18 and 28 degrees Celsius year round. Rain is almost non-existent, as Ilo is located north of the Atacama Desert, one of the driest coastal deserts in the world.

Climate data for Ilo (Punta Coles), elevation 25 m (82 ft), (1991–2020)
Month	Jan	Feb	Mar	Apr	May	Jun	Jul	Aug	Sep	Oct	Nov	Dec	Year
Mean daily maximum °C (°F)	25.5 (77.9)	25.7 (78.3)	24.9 (76.8)	23.3 (73.9)	21.8 (71.2)	19.9 (67.8)	18.8 (65.8)	18.7 (65.7)	19.3 (66.7)	20.9 (69.6)	22.9 (73.2)	24.3 (75.7)	22.2 (71.9)
Mean daily minimum °C (°F)	19.2 (66.6)	19.3 (66.7)	18.7 (65.7)	17.4 (63.3)	16.5 (61.7)	15.6 (60.1)	14.9 (58.8)	14.5 (58.1)	14.7 (58.5)	15.9 (60.6)	17.2 (63.0)	18.0 (64.4)	16.8 (62.3)
Average precipitation mm (inches)	0.4 (0.02)	0.4 (0.02)	0.5 (0.02)	0.0 (0.0)	0.6 (0.02)	0.4 (0.02)	3.0 (0.12)	1.6 (0.06)	1.8 (0.07)	0.6 (0.02)	0.7 (0.03)	0.0 (0.0)	10 (0.4)
Source: National Meteorology and Hydrology Service of Peru

== Pacific Ocean terminal of the Interoceanic Highway ==
Ilo is the southernmost of the three ports which comprise the Peruvian termini of the Interoceanic Highway which links the state of Acre, in the Amazon Basin in Brazil, across the Andes to the Pacific Ocean.

== Main sights ==
The main attraction is the Urban Center whose landmarks are:

- St. Jerome's temple, built in 1871
- Glorieta José Gálvez, built in 1915
- State Pier, built at the end of 19th century
- Punta Coles
- Peruvian Navy Museum
- "El Algarrobal" Museum.
- The powerful tubing right hander wave that breaks in the bay

=== Boliviamar ===
BoliviaMar is a narrow strip of beach located 17.5 km to the south, next to the coastal road that connects the departments of Tacna and Moquegua. It is a port concession to Bolivia and the terminus for a planned railway project.

== In popular culture ==
Ilo is referenced in the traditional sea shanty "Tom's Gone to Hilo".

== See also ==
- Moquegua
- Railway stations in Peru
