= List of Tibetan dog breeds =

The following is a list of dog breeds from Tibet:

Name	Original name if different	Recognition	Notes	Image
Lhasa Apso		AKC; FCI		Lhasa_Apso_(1)
Shih Tzu		ENCI; FCI		Shih_Tzu_Stmnbrfjd)
Tibetan Kyi Apso		None		
Tibetan Mastiff		AKC; FCI		Female_Tibetan_Mastiff
Tibetan Spaniel		AKC; FCI		Tibbies(Bu_t'chu_et_Doukki)
Tibetan Terrier		AKC; FCI		Tibetan_terrier_Moletai_May_2014
