= Tibetan Mastiff =

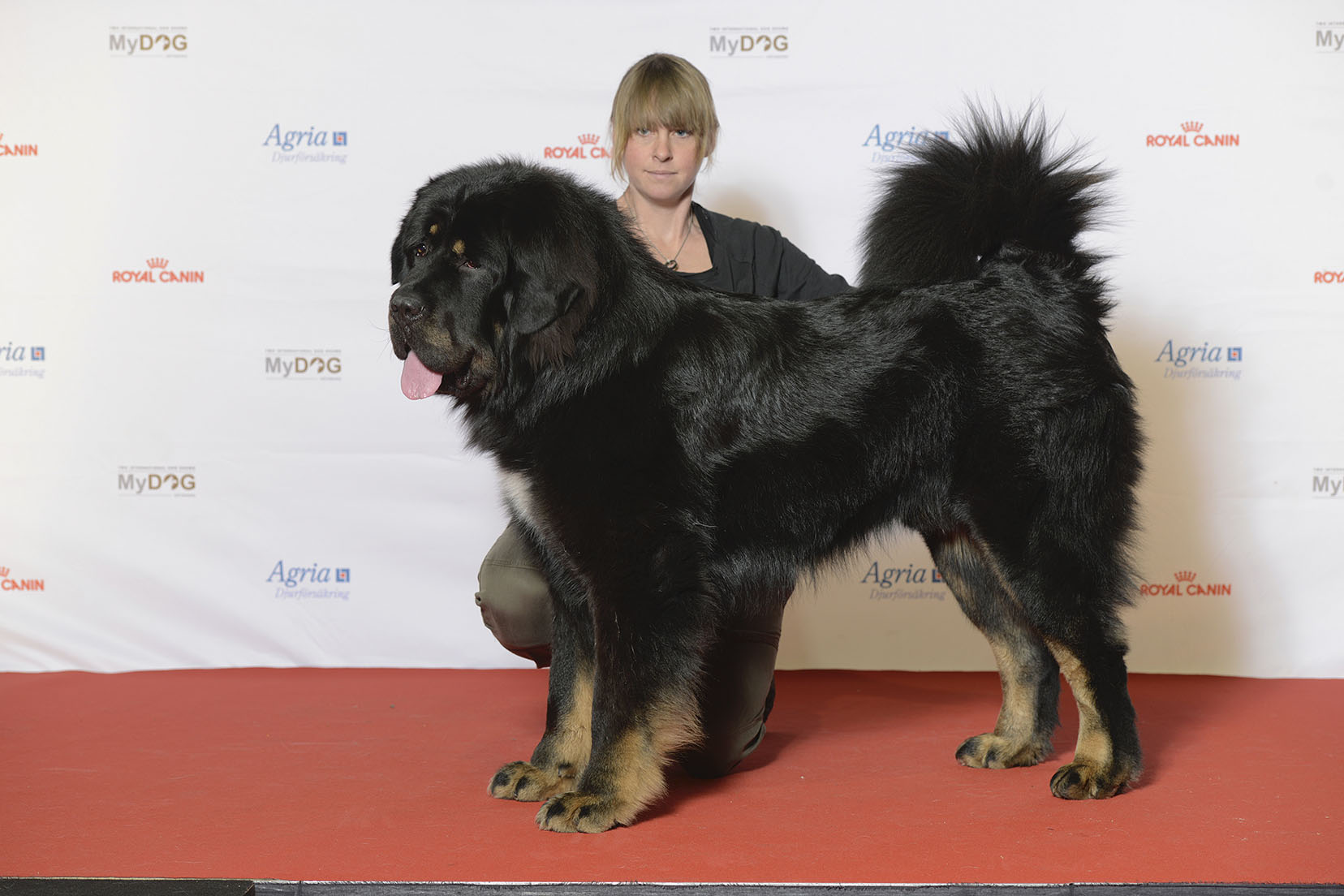
- Origin: Tibetan Plateau
Traits
Height	Males	66 cm (26 in)
	Females	61 cm (24 in)
Kennel club standards
- Fédération Cynologique Internationale: standard

The Tibetan Mastiff (Note: Tibetan: འབྲོག་ཁྱི། འདོགས་ཁྱི། སེང་ཁྱི།, romanized: Drok chi/kyi; 'Dok kyi; Seng kyi, lit. 'Nomad-dog; chaining dog; lion-dog', THL: Do khyi, Wylie: 'brog khyi; 'dogs khyi; seng khyi) is a large Tibetan dog breed. Its double coat is medium to long, subject to climate, and found in a wide variety of colors, including solid black, black and tan, various shades of red (from pale gold to deep red) and bluish-gray (dilute black), and sometimes with white markings around its neck, chest and legs. According to the American Kennel Club, male Tibetan Mastiffs have a weight of 40-70 kg (90-150 lbs) while females are 30-55 kg (70-120 lbs).

== Name ==
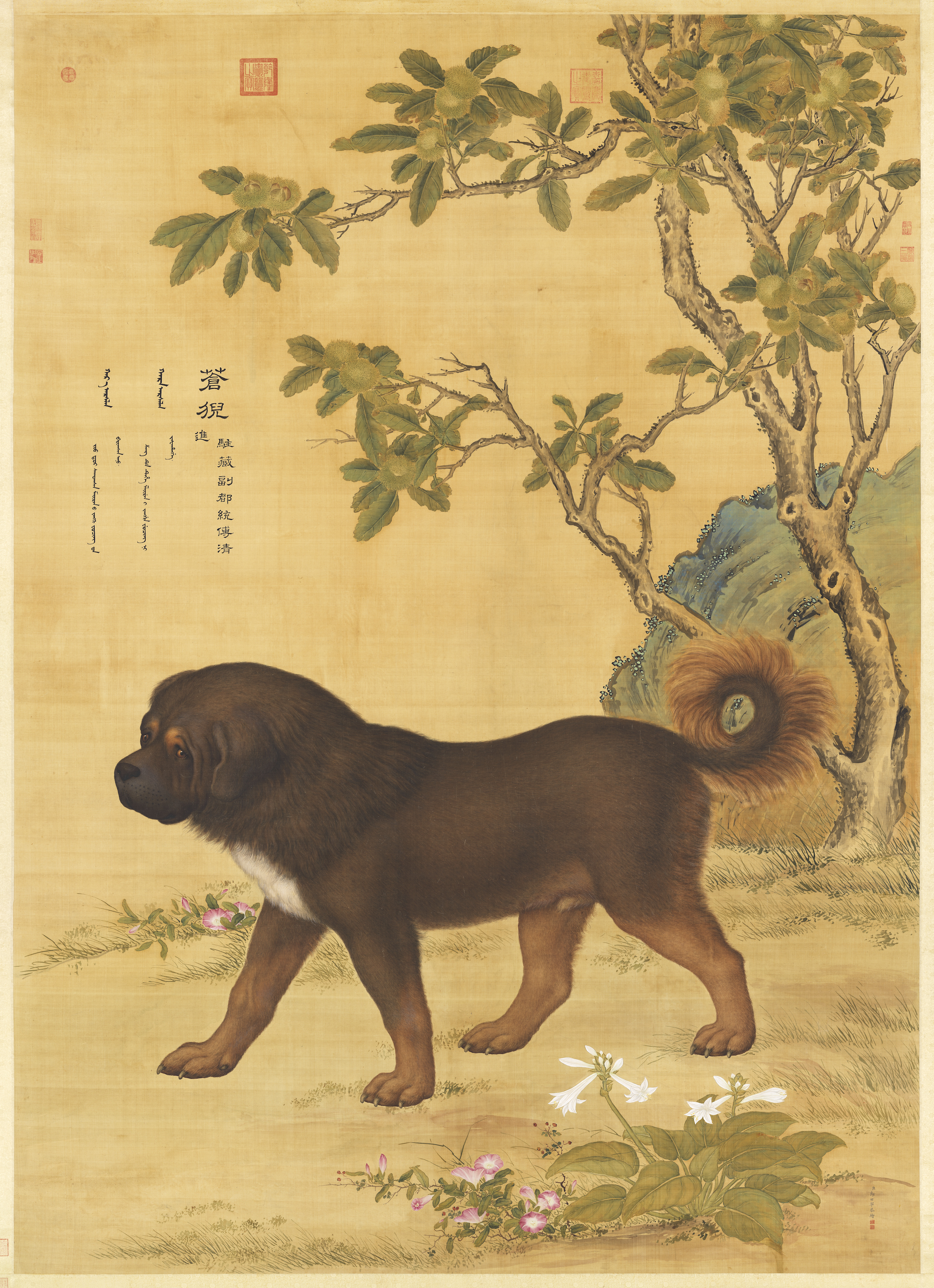
Ten Prized Dogs series, an artwork depicting a Tibetan mastiff.

The term mastiff was assigned by the Europeans who first came to Tibet because that name was used to refer to nearly all large dog breeds in the West. Early Western visitors to Tibet misnamed several of its breeds, such as the Tibetan terrier, which is not a terrier, and the Tibetan spaniel, which is not a spaniel. A better name for the breed might be the Tibetan mountain dog or—to encompass the landrace breed throughout its range—the Himalayan mountain dog.

== Description ==
=== Appearance ===
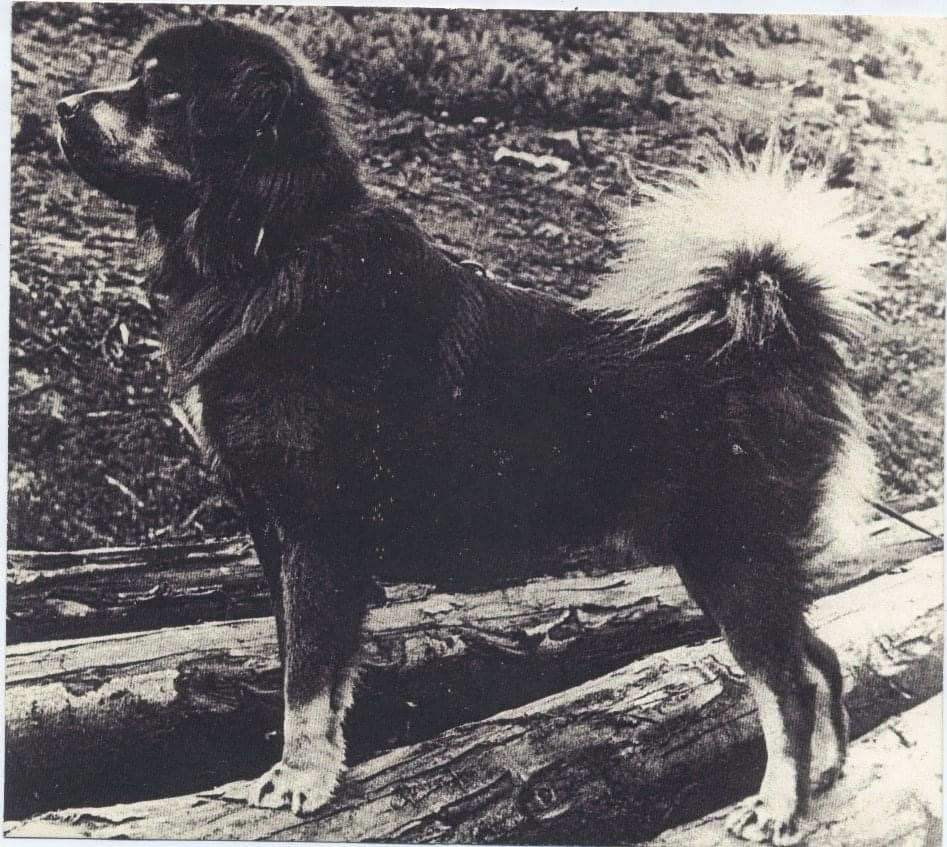
This side profile of Tü-Bo underscores the soundness and type that made him a sought-after stud dog.

It typically retains the hardiness which would be required for it to survive in Tibet, Ladakh and other high-altitude Himalayan regions.

Instinctive behaviors, including canine pack behavior, contributed to the survival of the breed in harsh environments. It is one of the few primitive dog breeds that retains a single estrus per year instead of two, even at much lower altitudes and in much more temperate climates than its native climate. This characteristic is also found in wild canids such as the wolf and other wild animals. Since its estrus usually takes place during late autumn, most Tibetan Mastiff puppies are born between December and January.

Its double coat is long, subject to climate, and found in a wide variety of colors, including solid black, black and tan, various shades of red (from pale gold to deep red) and bluish-gray (dilute black), often with white markings. As of 2014, some breeders had begun marketing white Tibetan mastiffs.

The coat of a Tibetan Mastiff lacks the unpleasant big-dog smell that affects many large breeds. The coat, whatever its length or color(s), should shed dirt and odors. Although the dogs shed somewhat throughout the year, there is generally one great molt in late winter or early spring and sometimes another, lesser molt in the late summer or early autumn. (Sterilization of the dog may dramatically affect the coat as to texture, density and shedding pattern.)

Tibetan Mastiffs are shown under one standard in the West, but separated by the Indian breed standard into two varieties: Lion Head (smaller; exceptionally long hair from forehead to withers, creating a ruff or mane) and Tiger Head (larger; shorter hair).

=== Temperament ===
As a flock guardian dog in Tibet, and in the West, it uses all the usual livestock guardian tactics (e.g., barking, scent-marking perimeters) to warn away predators and avoid direct confrontations.

As a socialized, domestic dog, it is able to comfortably live in a spacious, fenced yard with a canine companion; however, it is not an appropriate dog for apartment living. The Western-bred dogs are generally more easy-going, although still somewhat aloof with strangers. Through hundreds of years of selective breeding, the breed is known for being a nocturnal sentry, keeping potential predators and intruders at bay and barking at unidentified sounds throughout the night. They often sleep during the day, making them more active, alert, and aware at night.

Like all flock guardian breeds, they are intelligent and stubborn to a fault, so obedience training is recommended (although it is only mildly successful with some individuals) since this is a strong-willed, powerful-bodied breed. Unless they are to be used exclusively as livestock guardians, socialization training is also critical with this breed, because of their reserved nature with strangers and their guardian instincts. They can be excellent family dogs, depending on the family; owners must understand canine psychology and be able and willing to spend a lot of time and devotion to training their dogs. Lack of consistency can result in dogs with unpredictable behaviour. The protectiveness of Tibetan Mastiffs requires alertness and planning by the owner, in order to avoid mishaps when the dog is merely reacting as a guardian. The breed is not recommended for novice dog owners.

== Health ==
Many breeders claim a life expectancy of 10–16 years, but these claims are unsubstantiated. Some lines do produce long-lived dogs. Other, more closely inbred lines, produce short-lived, unhealthy dogs. The breed has fewer genetic health problems than many breeds, but cases can be found of hypothyroidism, entropion, ectropion, distichiasis, skin problems including allergies, autoimmune problems including demodex, Addison's disease, Cushing's disease, missing teeth, malocclusion (overbite, underbite, dry mouth), cardiac problems, seizures, epilepsy, progressive retinal atrophy (PRA), cataracts, and small ear canals with a tendency for infection. As with most large breeds, some will suffer with elbow or hip dysplasia.

Canine inherited demyelinative neuropathy (CIDN), an inherited condition, appeared in one of the prominent lines of Tibetan Mastiffs in the early 1980s. Unfortunately, known carriers were bred extensively and are behind many lines still being actively bred. Because the mode of inheritance appears to be as a simple recessive, continued inbreeding can still produce affected puppies.

Hypothyroidism is fairly common in Tibetan Mastiffs, as it is in many large "northern" breeds. They should be tested periodically throughout their lives using a complete thyroid "panel". However, because the standard thyroid levels were established using domestic dog breeds, test results must be considered in the context of what is "normal" for the breed, not what is normal across all breeds. Many dogs of this breed will have "low" thyroid values, but no clinical symptoms. Vets and owners differ on the relative merits of medicating dogs which test "low", but are completely asymptomatic.

== History ==
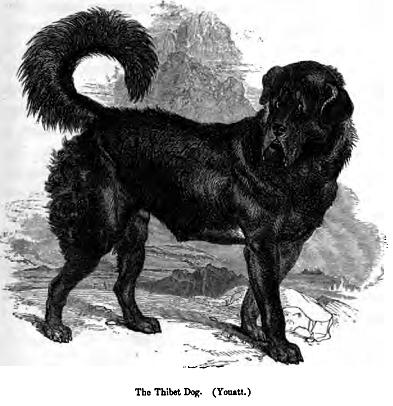
Tibetan dog from the 1850s

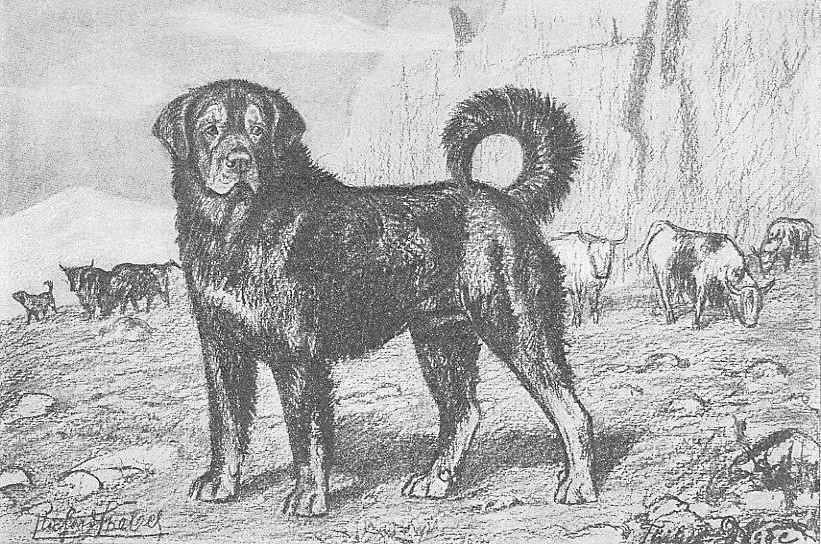
Realistic representation/correction of Tibetan dog in 1904 "The German dogs". Heliogravure, Richard Strbel

Originally these dogs were used to protect Buddhist monasteries and monks of Tibet from animals such as bears, wolves and snow leopards.

The Tibetan Mastiff is a phenotypically distinct dog breed that was bred as a flock guardian in the high altitudes of the Himalayas and the Tibetan Plateaus.

Meer Izzut-oollah (1872) wrote of the Tibetan Mastiff:

The dogs of Tibet are twice the size of those seen in India, with large heads and hairy bodies. They are powerful animals...During the day they are kept chained up, and are let loose at night to guard their masters' house.

In the early 20th century, the Prince of Wales, the future George V, introduced a pair of Tibetan Mastiffs to the United Kingdom. By 1906, the breed was prevalent enough in England to be shown at the Crystal Palace show. However, during the war years, the breed lost favor and focus and nearly died out in England.

The breed has been gaining in popularity worldwide since 1980. Although the breed is still considered somewhat uncommon, as more active breeders arose and produced adequate numbers of dogs, various registries and show organizations (FCI, AKC) began to recognize the breed. In 2008, the Tibetan Mastiff competed for the first time in the Westminster Kennel Club Dog Show.

Since AKC recognition, the number of active breeders has skyrocketed, leading to over-breeding of puppies, many of which are highly inbred and of questionable quality. Initially, the breed suffered because of the limited gene pool from the original stock. By 2015, due to excessive breeding and unsuitability of the breed as a pet in urban situations, prices in China for the best dogs had fallen to about $2,000, and both lower quality and crossbreed dogs were being abandoned.

In 2011, a DNA study concluded that there was a genetic relationship between the Tibetan mastiff and the Great Pyrenees, Bernese Mountain Dog, Rottweiler and Saint Bernard, and that these large breed dogs are probably partially descended from the Tibetan Mastiff. In 2014, a study added the Leonberger to the list of possible relatives.

=== Admixture with an unknown wolf-like canid ===
The Tibetan Mastiff was able to adapt to the extreme highland conditions of the Tibetan Plateau very quickly compared with other mammals such as the yak, Tibetan antelope, snow leopard, and the wild boar. The Tibetan mastiff's ability to avoid hypoxia in high altitudes, due to its higher hemoglobin levels compared with low-altitude dogs, was due to prehistoric interbreeding. In 2020, a genomic analysis indicates that a ghost population of an unknown wolf-like canid which is deeply-diverged from modern Holarctic wolves and dogs has contributed the EPAS1 allele found in both Himalayan wolves and dogs, and this allows them to live in high altitudes.

== Gallery ==
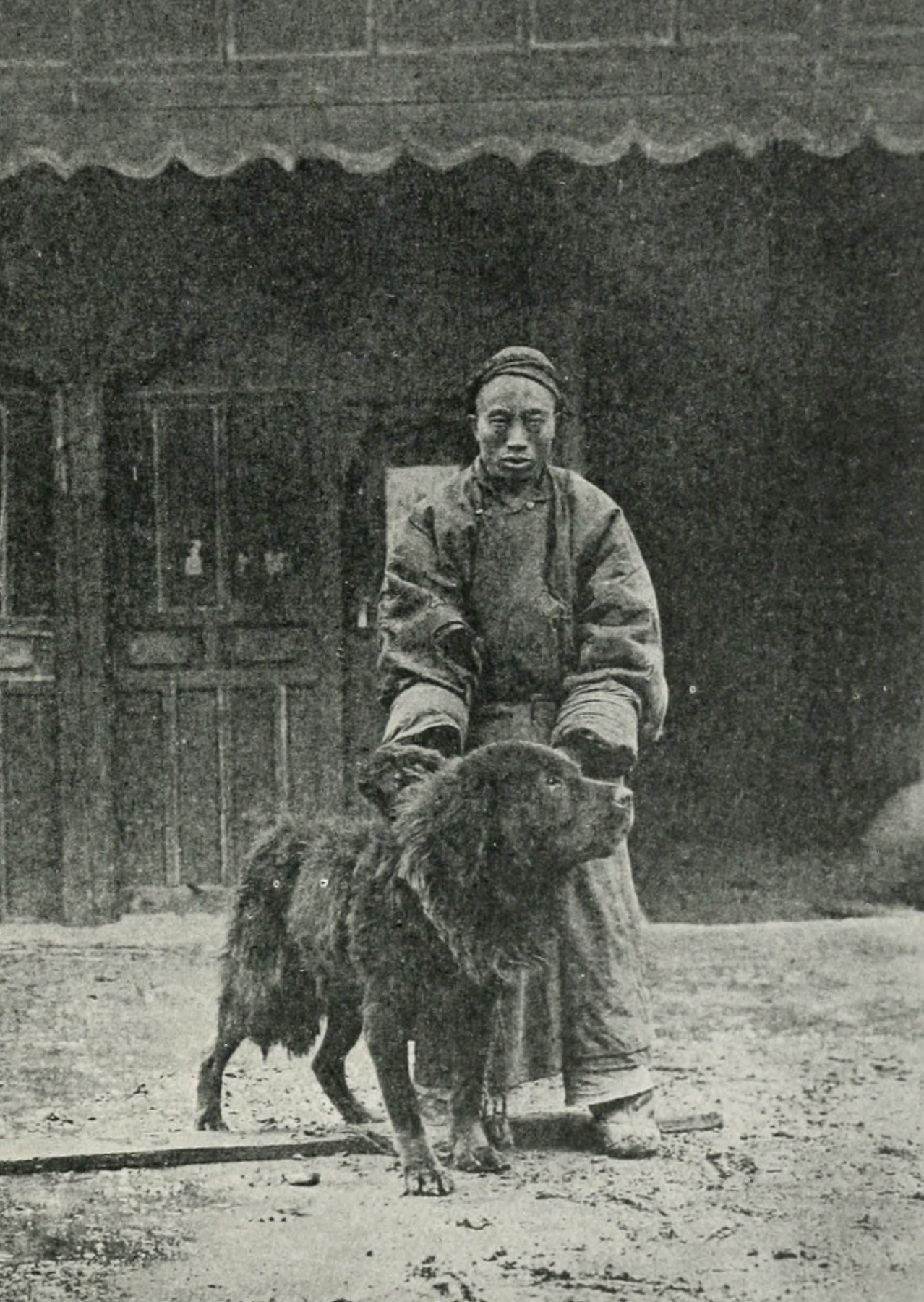
Tibetan Mastiff with its owner in 1911

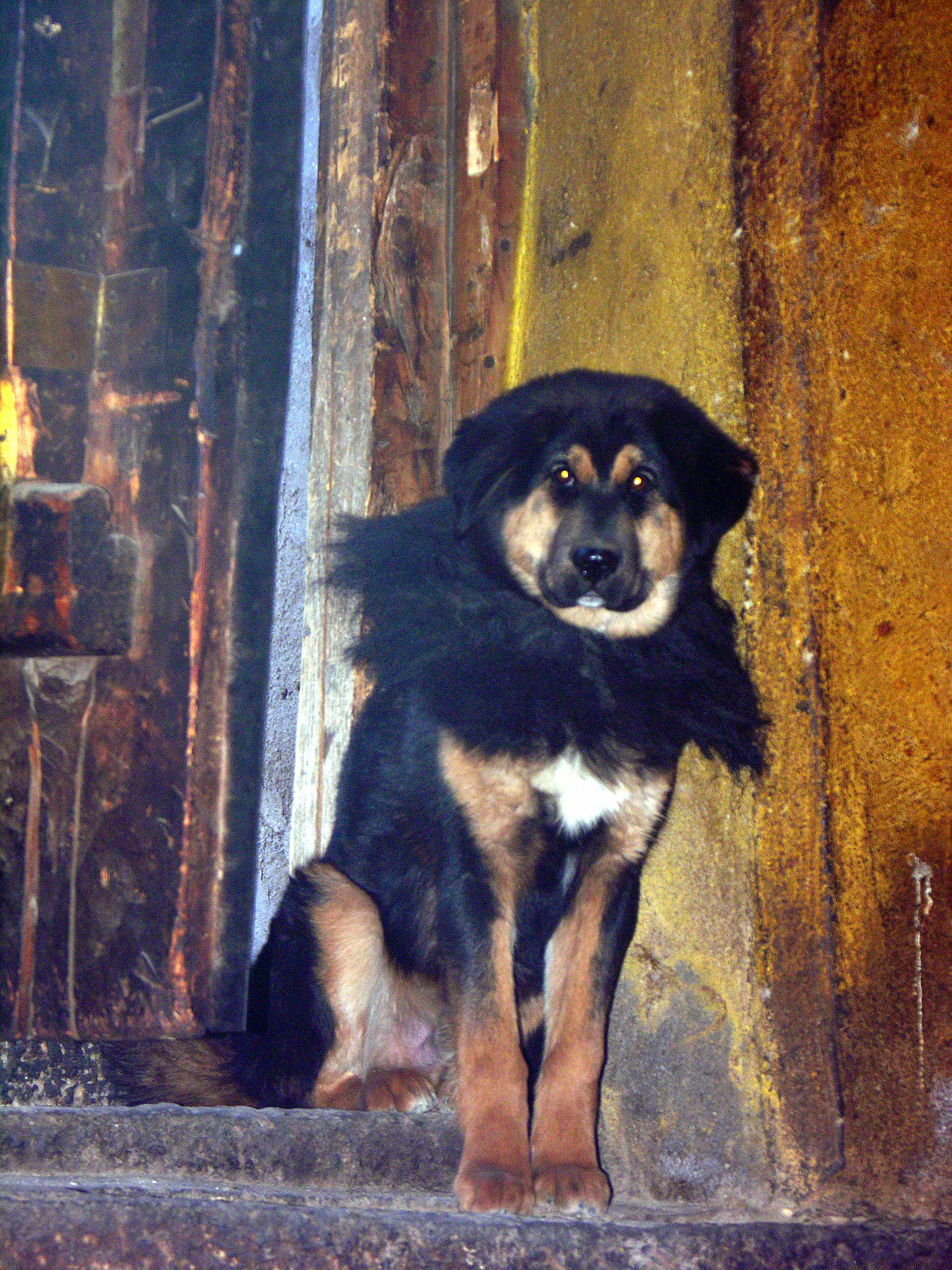
Tibetan Mastiff in Drepung Monastery, Lhasa, Tibet

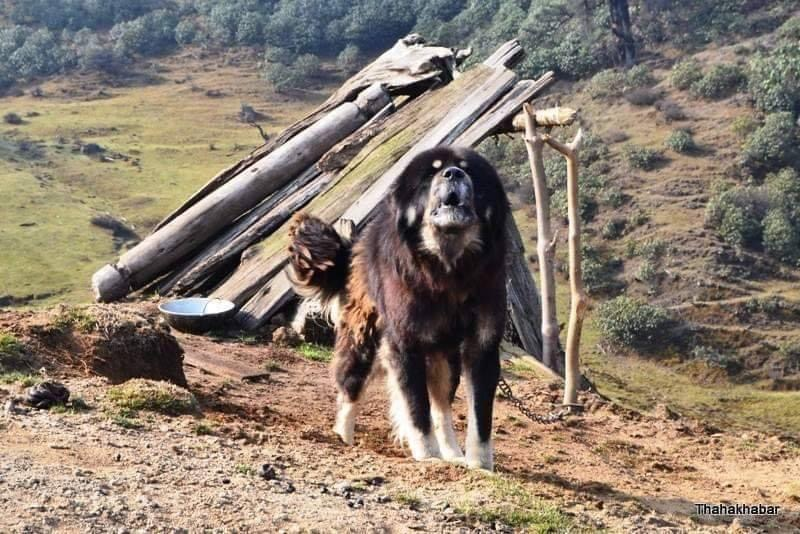
Tibetan Mastiff in Sandakpur, Nepal

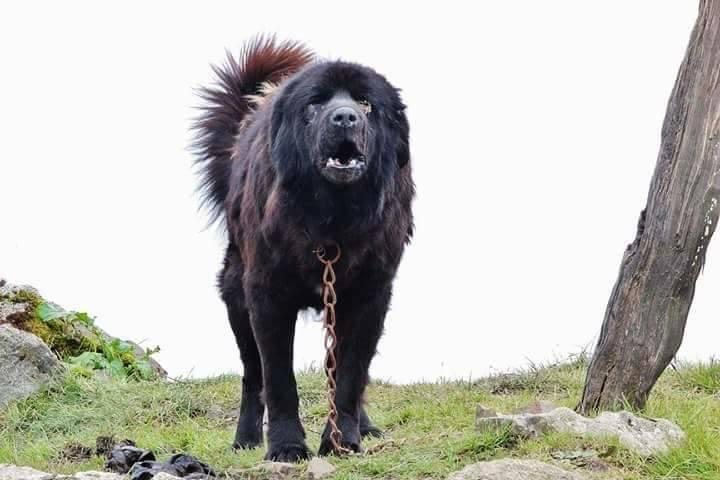
Tibetan Mastiff from Nepal

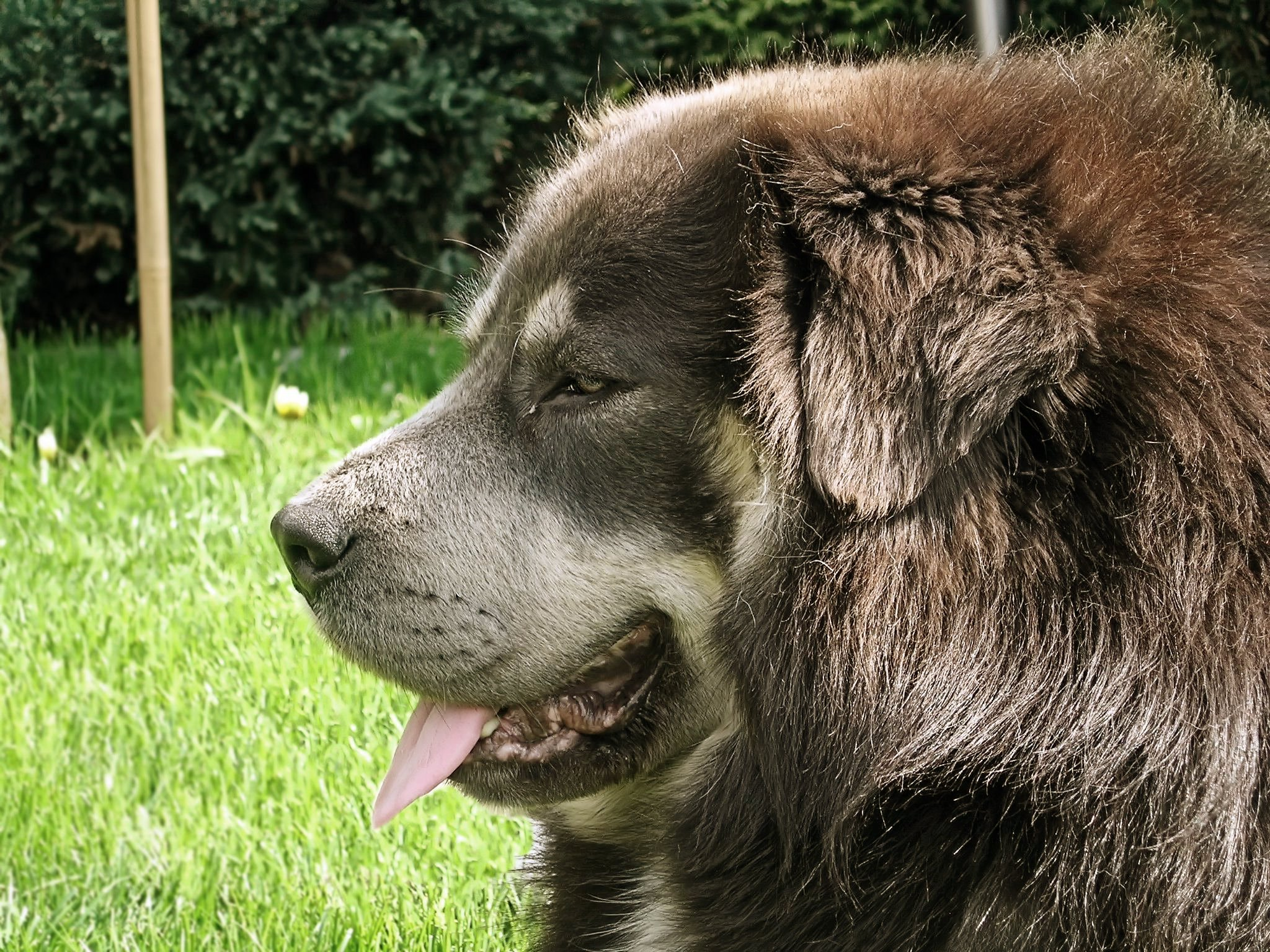
Tibetan Mastiff

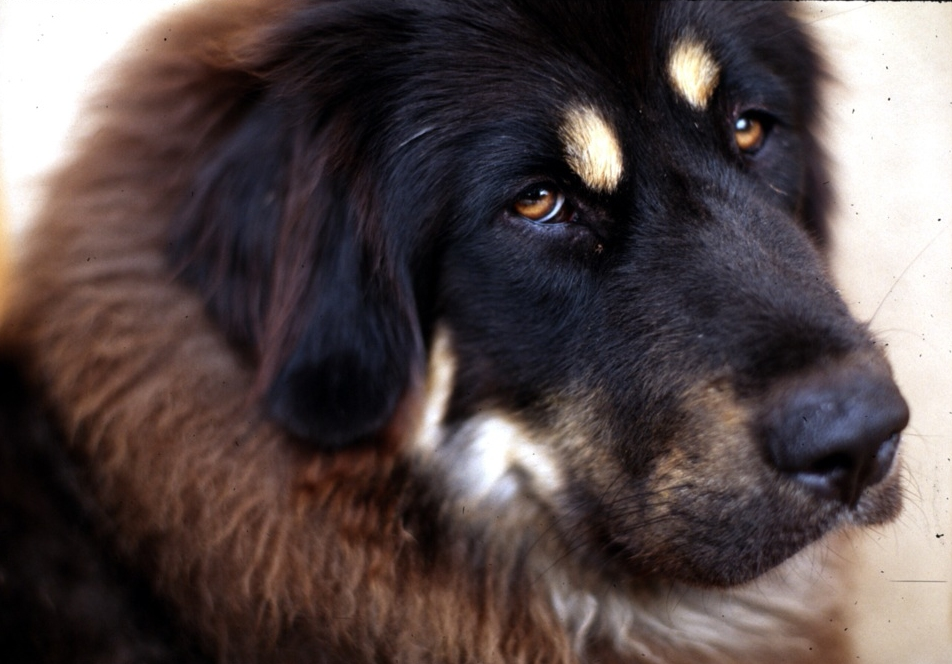

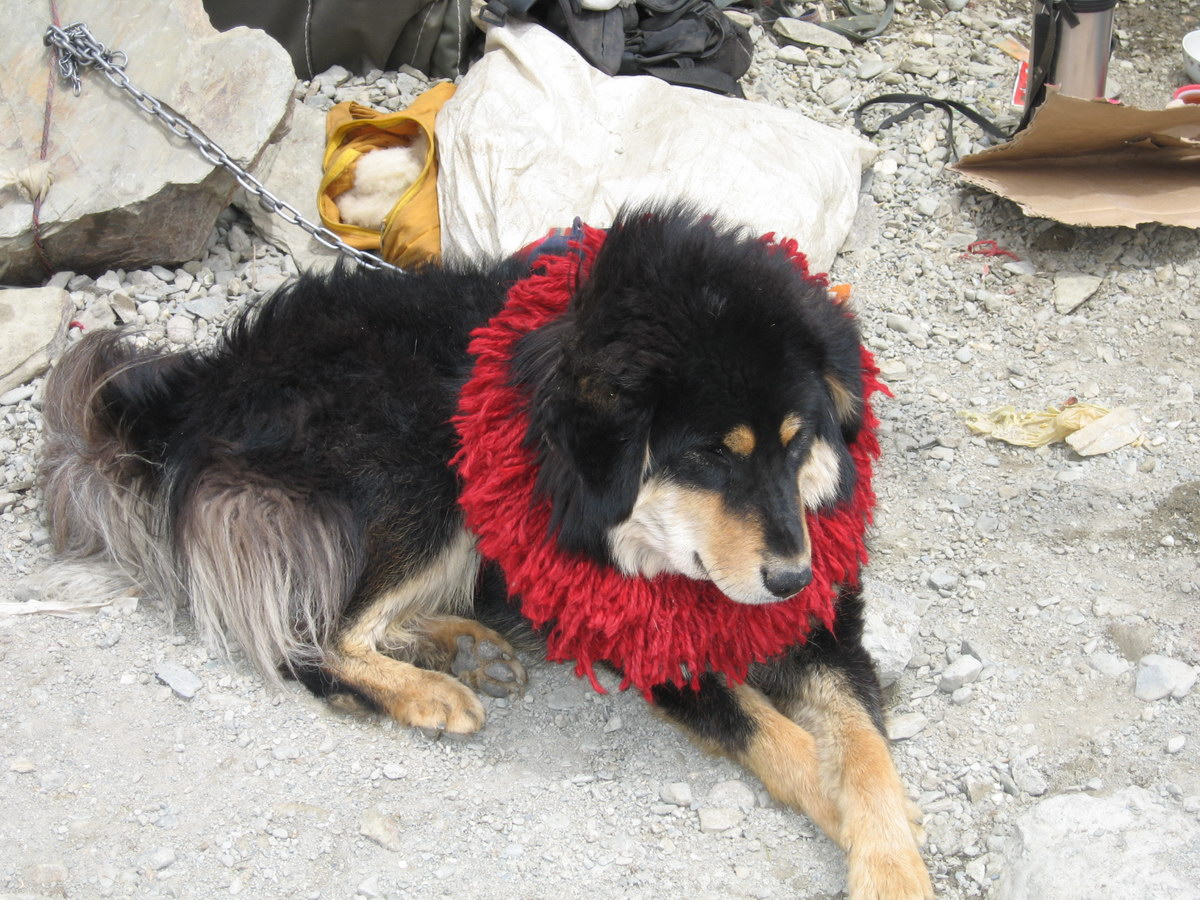
Tibetan Mastiff with red kekhor

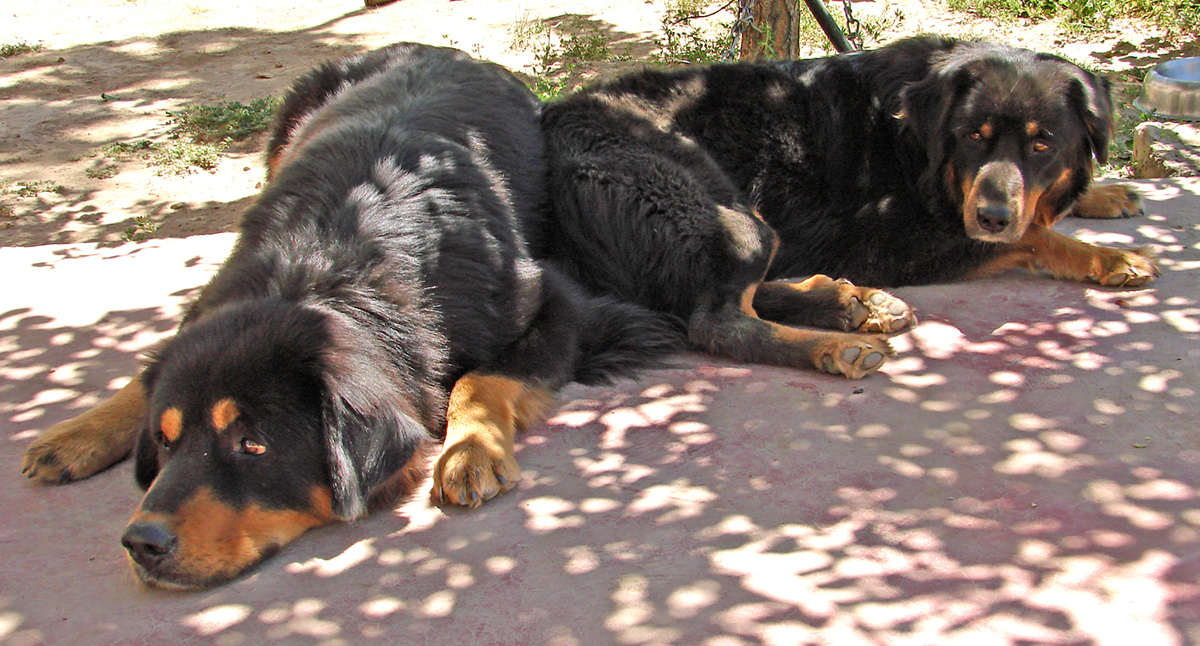
The Tibetan Mastiff is a livestock guard-dog

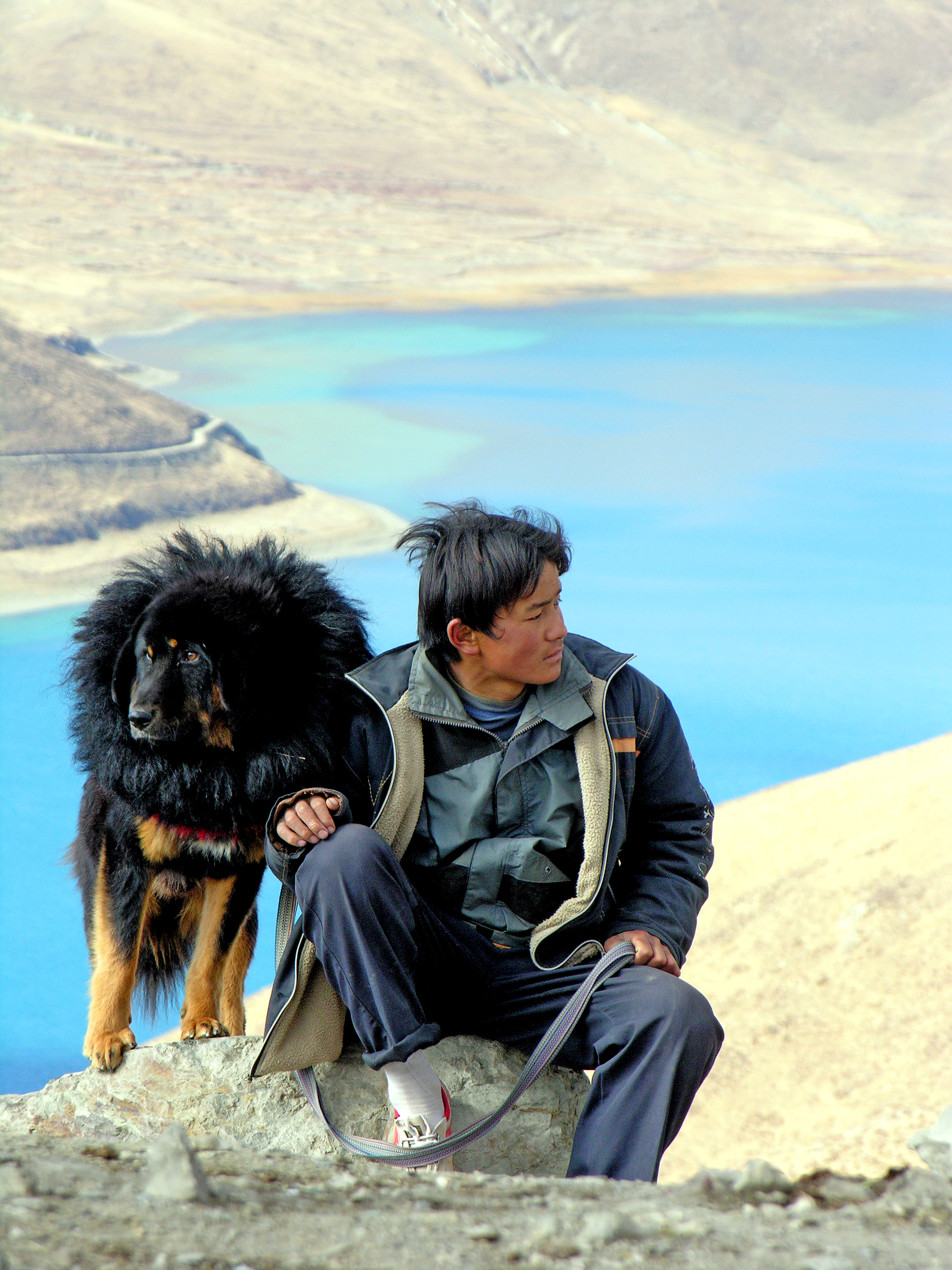
Tibetan man with his Mastiff

== Popular culture ==
- A Tibetan Mastiff named "Max" is the central antagonist in the 1993 horror film Man's Best Friend. At least five different dogs were used in filming.
- Ulysses, one of the main characters in the 2008 Christian animated film At Jesus' Side, is a Tibetan Mastiff.
- A Tibetan Mastiff is the subject of the 2011 animated film The Tibetan Dog.
- Mouse, a "Tibetan Temple dog" (a semi-divine creature that closely resembles a Mastiff), is the canine companion of the titular character of the Dresden Files book series.
- The animated film Rock Dog featured two Tibetan Mastiffs named "Bodi" and "Khampa" (voiced by Luke Wilson and J. K. Simmons, respectively).
- In the 2018 animated television series, Craig of the Creek, the character Wildernessa rides around on a Tibetan Mastiff named Cheesesticks.
- In the 2011 film Old Dog by director Pema Tseden, the Tibetan Mastiff of a herder family is coveted by several characters to be traded to rich Han Chinese in the eastern part of the country.
- The 2019 video game Indivisible features Lanshi, a Tibetan Mastiff, as a playable character.
- The 2019 manga Ginga Densetsu Noah features three Tibetan Mastiffs as the main antagonists.
- In the 2020 video game Ghost of Tsushima, Bankhar Dogs (not Tibetian Mastiffs) are guard dogs of the Mongol army.
- The Pokémon Mabosstiff, first featured in Scarlet and Violet versions, is heavily based on a Tibetan Mastiff.

== See also ==
- List of dog breeds
- Tibetan Kyi Apso
- Dog of Osu
- Himalayan Sheepdog
- Lhasa Apso
- Tibetan Spaniel
- Tibetan Terrier
- Chow Chow
