= Tibetan Terrier =

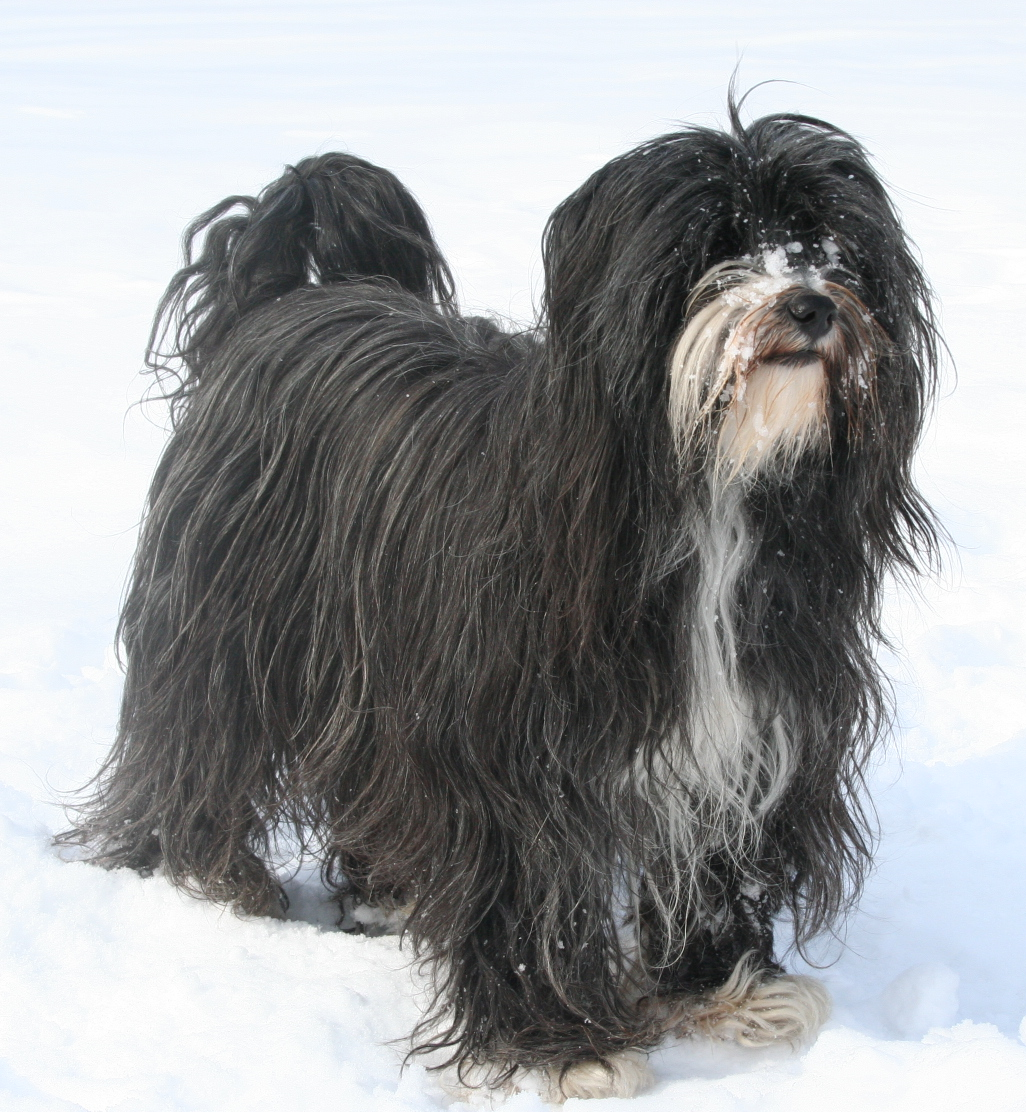
- Other names: Tsang Apso, Dokhi Apso
- Origin: Tibet
Kennel club standards
- Fédération Cynologique Internationale: standard

Seated four-year-old female Tibetan Terrier

The Tibetan Terrier is a medium-sized breed of dog that originated in Tibet. Despite its name, it is not a member of the terrier group. The breed was given its English name by European travelers due to its resemblance to known terrier breeds. The Tibetan name for the breed, Tsang Apso, roughly translates to "shaggy or bearded ("apso") dog, from the province of Tsang". Some old travelers' accounts refer to the dog as Dokhi Apso or "outdoor" Apso, indicating a shaggy or bearded working dog which lives outdoors.

== History ==
Tibetan Terriers have been bred and raised in monasteries of Tibet for 2,000 years. Historically, Tibetan Terriers were kept as good luck charms, mascots, watchdogs, herding dogs, and companions. They were also used to retrieve articles that fell down mountainsides.

Dr. Agnes Greig of England brought the first Tibetan Terrier to Europe in 1922. She was given a gold and white female puppy named Bunti after successfully performing an operation on a patient in Tibet. After acquiring a male, Rajah, Dr. Greig established a kennel and began to breed them.

The first litter was born in 1924 and were registered as Lhasa Terriers. In 1930, the Kennel Club of India changed the breed's name to Tibetan Terrier. The first Tibetan Terriers in the US were imported in 1956 by Dr. Henry and Mrs. Alice Murphy of Great Falls, Virginia, from Dr. Greig's kennel, Lamleh. In 1973, the American Kennel Club recognized the breed, classifying it as part of the non-sporting group.

Tibetan Terriers are related to and have contributed to the development of other breeds, including the Shih Tzu, Lhasa Apso, Tibetan Spaniel, Polish Lowland Sheepdog, among others.

== Appearance ==
The Tibetan Terrier is a powerful, medium-sized dog of square proportions, with a shaggy coat. They vary widely in height and weight, ranging from 14 to 16 in (35–41 cm) and is 18–30 lb (8–14 kg), with 20–24 lb (9.5–11 kg) preferred for either sex. All weights are acceptable if in proportion to the size. Fully grown, the Tibetan Terrier resembles a miniaturized Bearded Collie. The head is moderate, with a strong muzzle of medium length, and a skull neither rounded nor flat. The eyes are large, dark, and set fairly far apart. The V-shaped drop ears are well-feathered, and should be set high on the sides of the skull. Although the preferred colour for the nose is black, in showdogs, they are also sometimes brown. The body is well-muscled and compact. The length of the back should be equal to the height at the withers, giving the breed its typical square look. The tail is set high, well-feathered, and carried in a curl over the back. One of the more unusual features of the Tibetan Terrier is their broad, flat feet with hair between the toes, which are ideal for climbing mountains, acting as natural snowshoes.

The hair of the Tibetan Terrier has a long growth cycle. As a result, their coat grows quite long and pet animals will require occasional trimming. They do not shed like dogs with shorter hair growth cycles, but rather slough hair at a rate similar to that of most humans. The exception is at approximately nine months when puppies slough their entire coat in advance of acquiring their adult coat. The double coat is profuse, with a warm undercoat and a topcoat which has the texture of human hair. It should not be silky or curled, but wavy is acceptable. Long and thick, it is shown natural, but should not be so long as to touch the floor, as is typical in breeds such as the Lhasa Apso or Maltese. A fall of hair covers the face and eyes, but long eyelashes generally prevent hair from getting in the Tibetan Terrier's eyes, and the breed has very good eyesight.

All colors are permissible, barring liver and chocolate, and none is preferred. Gold is the rarest. Tibetan Terriers are available in any combination of solid, parti-color, tricolor, red sable, or piebald, as long as the nose leather is black and the eyes and eye rims are dark.

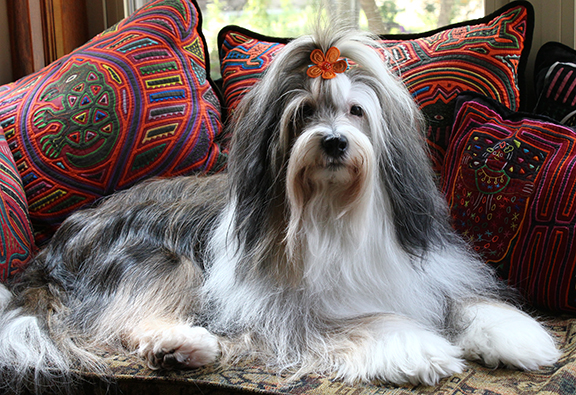
Tibetan Terrier

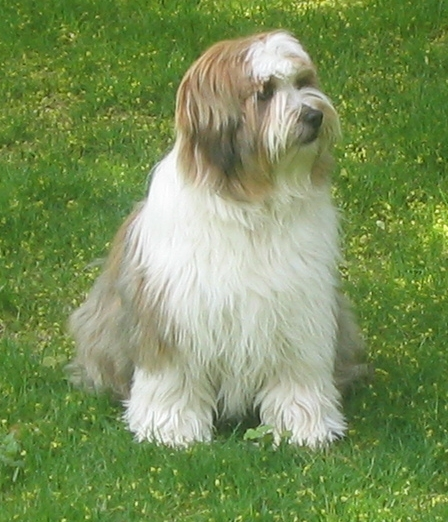
Tibetan Terrier, parti coloured (white and red sable)

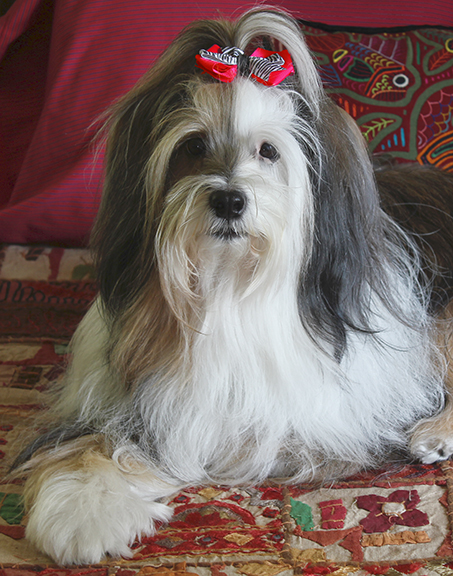
Tibetan Terrier

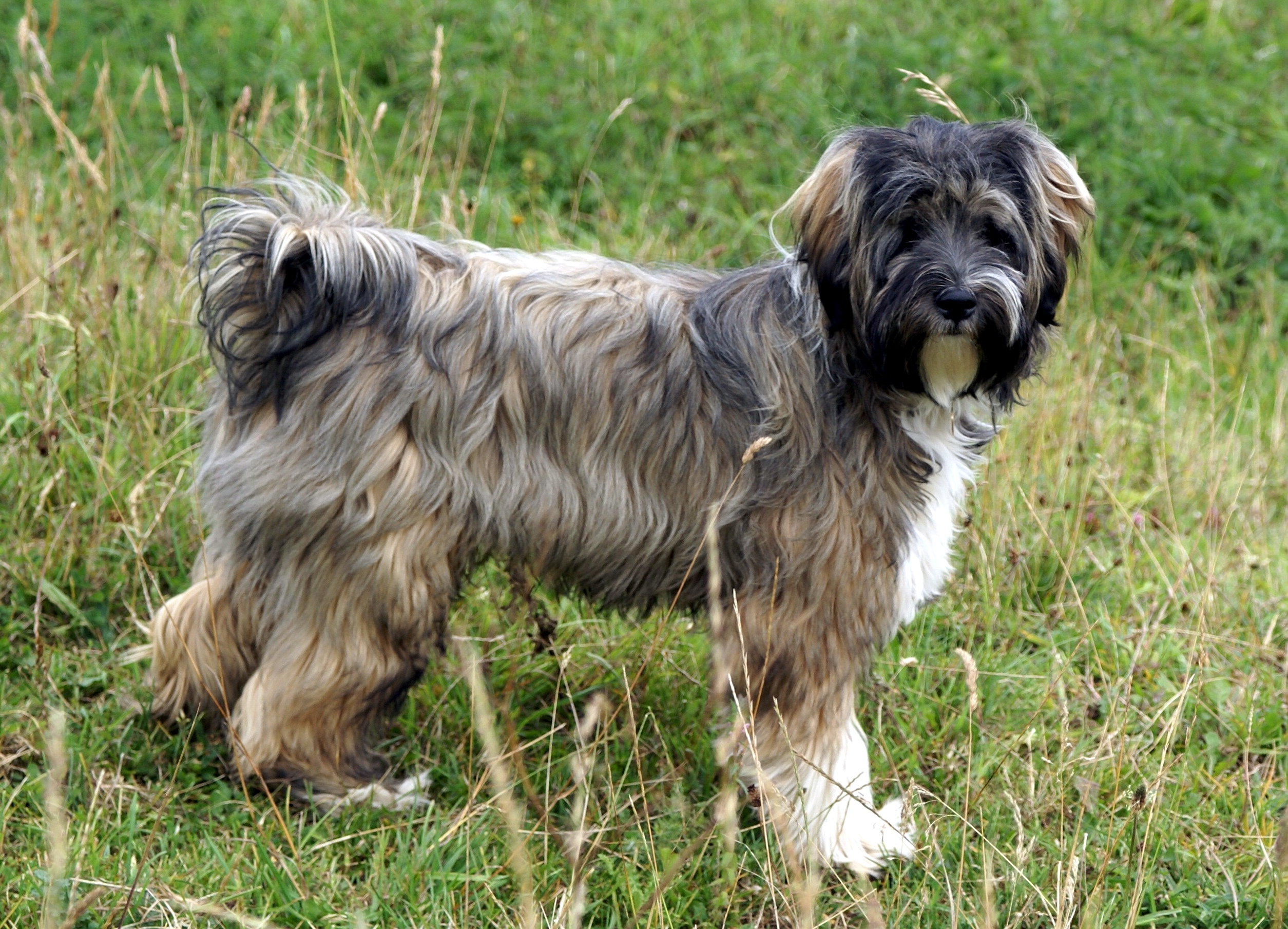
Tibetan Terrier (7 months)

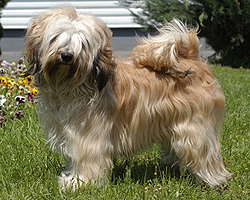
Cream colored Tibetan Terrier. The tail is set high, well-feathered and carried in a curl over the back

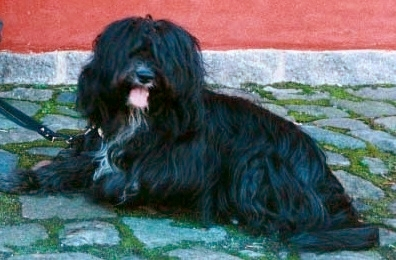
Tibetan Terrier, black coat.

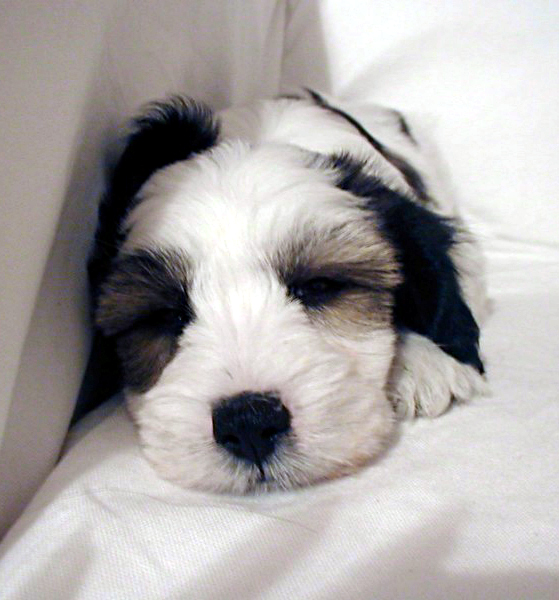
Tibetan Terrier puppy

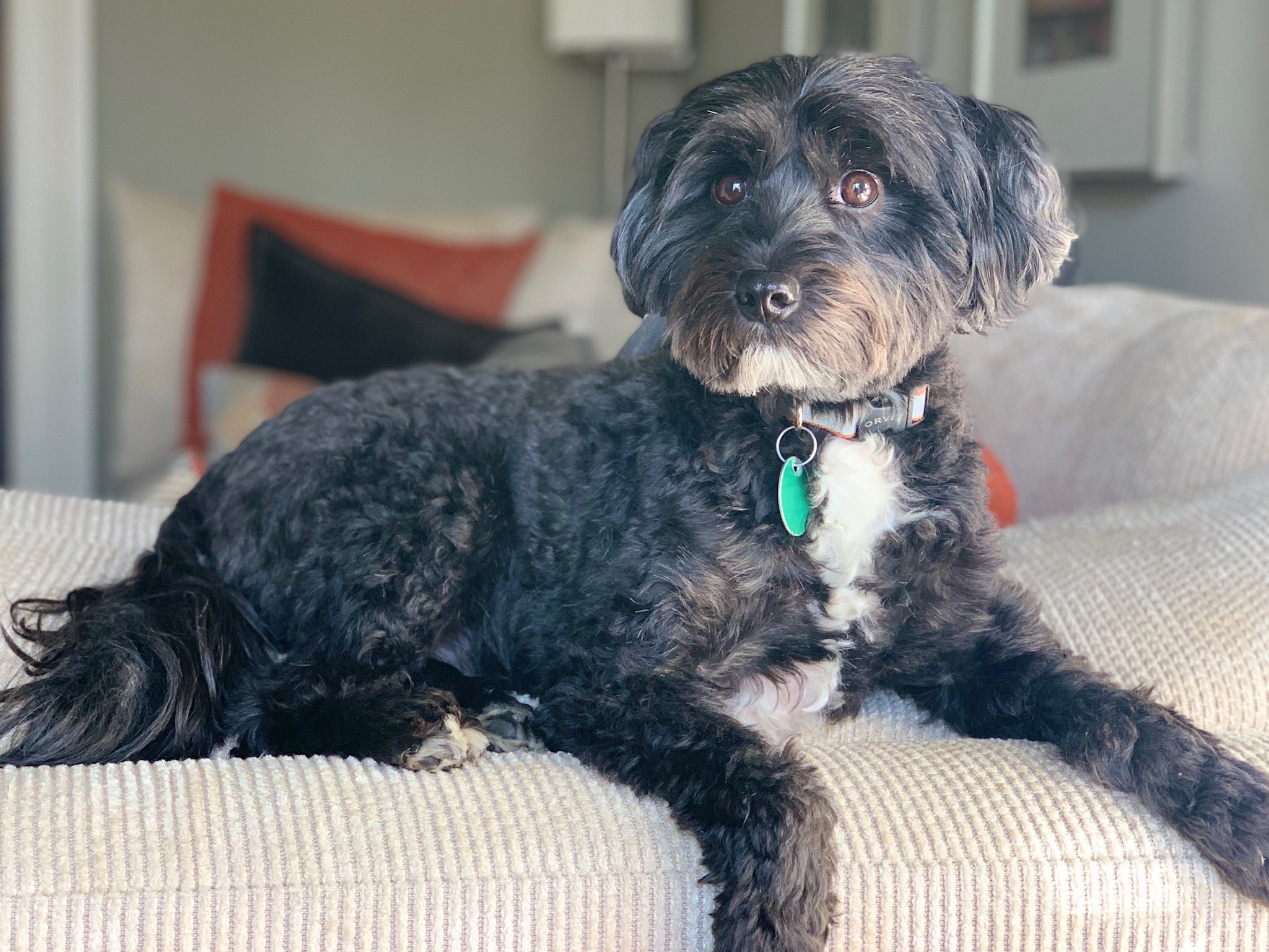
Eight year old male Tibetan Terrier sporting a "lamb cut"

== Temperament ==
The temperament has been one of the most attractive aspects of the breed since it was established. They are amiable and affectionate family dogs, sensitive to their owners, and gentle with older children if properly introduced. As is fitting for a dog with origins as a watch dog, Tibetans tend to be reserved around strangers, but should never be aggressive or shy with them. The Tibetan Terrier has a deep bark and is prone to excessive barking.

While suitable for apartment living, the Tibetan is an energetic dog that requires regular exercise. The energy level of the Tibetan is moderate to high and its general nature is happy, active, lively, intelligent, and agile. As a result, they are often well-suited for dog sports such as agility. They are steadfast, determined, and clever, which can lead to them being stubborn. Tibetan Terriers are usually charming and loyal. Some dogs of this breed can often be guarding of their resources, which can make it hard to live with another pet.

== Activities ==
The Tibetan Terrier can compete in dog agility trials, obedience, rally obedience, showmanship, flyball, tracking, and even herding events. Herding instincts and trainability can be measured at non-competitive herding tests. Tibetan Terriers that exhibit basic herding instincts can be trained to compete in herding trials.

== Health ==
A 2024 UK study found a life expectancy of 13.8 years for the breed compared to an average of 12.7 for purebreeds and 12 for crossbreeds.

Tibetan Terriers can carry the genetic disease canine neuronal ceroid lipofuscinosis, called Batten disease in humans. The first symptom of the disease is night blindness. Blindness and neurological signs such as epilepsy, motor abnormalities, dementia, and unexpected aggression may follow some years later. The gene responsible for the disease in Tibetan Terriers was identified in 2009 and there is a DNA test available for it. A German study showed that about one third of Tibetan Terriers in a German Tibetan Terrier club were carriers, but thanks to the use of DNA testing along with a prohibition on carriers being bred together, none of the club's dogs were affected by the disease.

The Tibetan Terrier is one of the more commonly affected breeds for primary lens luxation which is caused by an autosomal recessive mutation of the ADAMTS17 gene.

== Notable Owners ==
Actor Hugh Bonneville (Downton Abbey) and his family own two Tibetans. UK TV presenter Clare Balding specifically chose the breed for being suitable for her wife who is allergic to pet dander.

== See also ==
- List of dog breeds
- Dog of Osu
- Tibetan dog breeds
- Tibetan kyi apso
- Lhasa Apso
- Tibetan Mastiff
- Tibetan Spaniel
- Index of Tibet-related articles
- Companion dog
- Companion Dog Group
- Utility Group
- Non-Sporting Group
