= Tibetan Kyi Apso =

- Other names: Bearded Tibetan Mastiff; Tibetan Collie; Apso Do Khyi; Baan Gaddi
- Origin: Tibet
- Breed status: Not recognised as a breed by any major kennel club.
Traits
- Height: 63–71 cm (25–28 in)
- Weight: 32–41 kg (71–90 lb)
- Coat: Heavy double coat; rough-wiry especially over the eyes
- Colour: Typically black with pale extremities

The Tibetan Kyi Apso (Tibetan: འདོགས་ཁྱི; Wylie: 'dogs khyi) is a medium to large sized breed of livestock guardian dog originating from Tibet and the Himalayas. It is considered an ancient and rare landrace, similar in appearance and stature to its relative, the Tibetan Mastiff.

== Description ==
When compared to the standard Tibetan Mastiff, the Kyi Apso has a lighter, shaggier appearance; the breed has a bearded muzzle without sagging dewlaps, no excessive facial wrinkles, long hairy ears, comparatively long legs, a more slender body and a fully curled tail. The breed typically stands between 63 and 71 centimetres (25 and 28 in) tall and weighs between 32 and 41 kilograms (71 and 90 lb), the long double coat is usually black with lighter coloured extremities, although other colours are seen including greys, browns, reds and tans.

An athletic breed, the Tibetan Kyi Apso has a distinctive rolling, bouncy trot and a deep resonant bark. The breed is considered independent, highly intelligent, alert and energetic; it is particularly stubborn and territorial, is instinctively wary of strangers and aggressive towards intruders.

== History ==
The Tibetan Kyi Apso's traditional range is on the Tibetan Plateau near Mount Kailash, it is said the breed has been present in its home range since antiquity. It believed that it diverged from the Tibetan Mastiff as a distinct, bearded variety at some point. In its home range the breed was traditionally kept to protect livestock from predators as well as to guard their master's homes and settlements. The breed's Pashmina has traditionally been saved and used to weave small carpets.

The breed was unknown to the west before 1937 when an example belonging to the 13th Dalai Lama was photographed by Mrs Eric Bailey, the wife of a British diplomat attached to the British Diplomatic Mission in Lhasa. In the 1970s American field workers operating in North-West Nepal observed some in the possession of traders, in subsequent years different American field workers managed to acquire two puppies in the vicinity of Mount Kailash although it was not until the 1990s when six specimens were smuggled out of Tibet to the United States and a breed club was formed. The bearded Tibetan Mastiff was imported by cynologist and dog breeder, George Augustus Graham in the late 19th century as a 'Tibetan wolf-dog', contributing to the revival of the Irish Wolfhound breed.

== See also ==
- List of dog breeds
- Lhasa Apso
- Tibetan Spaniel
- Tibetan terrier
