= Sudden acquired retinal degeneration syndrome =

Disease of dogs

Sudden acquired retinal degeneration syndrome (SARDS) is a disease in dogs causing sudden blindness. It can occur in any breed, but female dogs may be predisposed. Approximately 4000 cases are seen in the United States annually.

== Characteristics ==
Symptoms include sudden permanent blindness, but may occur more slowly over several days, weeks or months, dilated pupils. Pupillary light reflexes are usually reduced but present; the slow phase mediated by melanopsin in retinal ganglion cells is retained. Other symptoms commonly seen are similar to those seen with Cushing's disease and include increased water consumption and urination, weight gain, confusion, restlessness, behavioral changes and lethargy. These symptoms may develop over a few months preceding the onset of SARDS. Clinical signs and disease progression vary markedly among individual animals, depending on the number and type of hormones that are increased, the degree of hormone elevation, and the age of the dog.

Some owners notice a more obvious "eye shine" in photographs due to the dilated pupils and retinal atrophy creating what is described as a "hyper-reflective tapetum".

== Causes ==
The cause of SARDS is considered to be idiopathic and the veterinary community is divided as to its cause, but the most common hypotheses on the causes of the disease possibly include autoimmune disease, or exposure to toxins. Autoimmune disease as a cause is controversial because some studies have supported the presence of antiretinal autoantibodies in dogs with SARDS, but others have failed to show a link. Despite similar symptoms and blood test results to Cushing's disease, evaluation of dogs with SARDS did not reveal any tumors in the pituitary or adrenal glands, and recent work has indicated significant differences in the clinical and laboratory test parameters between the two diseases.

== Diagnosis ==
Examination with an ophthalmoscope will initially show no changes, but in a few months atrophy of the retina will resemble the appearance of progressive retinal atrophy. Pathologically, there is a loss of the rod and cone cells followed by degeneration of other layers of the retina. The retinal degeneration appears to be related to apoptosis of these cells. SARDS must be distinguished from other causes of sudden blindness that have no visible pathology, including retrobulbar optic neuritis, a tumor at the optic chiasm, or other central nervous system diseases. Electroretinography is useful to definitively diagnose SARDS.

== Treatment ==
While there is no unilateral treatment for SARDS researchers at the Iowa State University (ISU) led by Dr. Siniša Grozdanić, a veterinary ophthalmologist at ISU, have successfully restored vision in two dogs who have been in 2007 successfully treated through an experimental treatment by intravenous immunoglobin (IVIg). "Although the dogs won't be catching any Frisbees, they can navigate and not bump into objects", Dr. Grozdanić notes.

Various immunosuppressive treatment regimens have been tried, but are not consistently effective. Treatment regimens with adrenal steroids and thyroid hormones have been proposed, but as of 2016 no controlled, peer reviewed studies had investigated the effectiveness of such treatments.
