= Rock Dog =

2016 animated film by Ash Brannon

- English theatrical release poster
- Chinese: 摇滚藏獒
- Directed by: Ash Brannon
- Screenplay by: Ash Brannon; Kurt Voelker
- Story by: Ash Brannon; Zheng Jun
- Based on: Tibetan Rock Dog by Zheng Jun
- Produced by: Amber Wang; David B. Miller; Rob Feng; Joyce Lou; Zheng Jun
- Starring: Luke Wilson; Eddie Izzard; J. K. Simmons; Lewis Black; Kenan Thompson; Mae Whitman; Jorge Garcia; Matt Dillon; Sam Elliott
- Edited by: Ivan Bilancio; Ed Fuller
- Music by: Rolfe Kent
- Production companies: Huayi Brothers; Mandoo Pictures; H. Brothers Entertainment; Eracme Entertainment; Dream Factory Group; Reel FX Animation
- Distributed by: Huayi Brothers (China); Summit Entertainment (United States)
- Release dates: June 15, 2016 (SIFF); July 8, 2016 (China); February 24, 2017 (United States)
- Running time: 89 minutes
- Countries: United States; China
- Languages: English; Mandarin
- Budget: $60 million
- Box office: $24.1 million

Rock Dog (simplified Chinese: 摇滚藏獒; traditional Chinese: 搖滾藏獒; pinyin: Yáogǔn Zàng'áo, literally Rock and Roll Tibetan Mastiff) is a 2016 animated comedy film directed by Ash Brannon and written by Brannon and Kurt Voelker. The film is loosely based on the manhua Tibetan Rock Dog by Zheng Jun. It features the voices of Eddie Izzard, J. K. Simmons, Lewis Black, Luke Wilson, Kenan Thompson, Mae Whitman, Jorge Garcia, Matt Dillon, and Sam Elliott. The film focuses on a young Tibetan Mastiff who leaves his mountain home village to become a rock musician in the big city after a radio falls from the sky.

Rock Dog was released on July 8, 2016 in China by Huayi Brothers and on February 24, 2017 in the United States by Summit Entertainment. The film received mixed reviews from critics and underperformed at the box office, grossing $24 million against a $60 million budget. It was followed by two direct-to-video sequels, Rock Dog 2: Rock Around the Park in 2021 and Rock Dog 3: Battle the Beat in 2023.

== Plot ==
Teenage Tibetan Mastiff Bodi is expected to be the next guard of the village of Snow Mountain, succeeding his father Khampa, who years ago drove out a pack of gangster grey wolves, led by the villainous Linnux. To maintain the illusion of multiple guards, Khampa has local sheep disguised as Mastiffs, but Bodi struggles to master the Iron Paw, a powerful move that requires him to "find the fire". Khampa has long ago banned music in the village to prevent distractions.

One day, Bodi indirectly causes a nearby flying plane to drop a package, which includes a radio. Entranced with British rock legend Angus Scattergood, Bodi defies his father by modifying a traditional dramyin into a conventional Western guitar and neglecting his duties to pursue music. Despite an incident where Bodi mistakenly alerts the village to a false alarm, elder Fleetwood Yak convinces Khampa to let Bodi follow his dream, giving him a bus ticket to the city with a promise to return and surrender music if unsuccessful. At the bus station, Bodi is discovered by two of Linnux's henchman, Riff and Skozz, and Linnux orders them to kidnap Bodi, reasoning it is his chance to take over Snow Mountain.

In the city, Bodi heads to Rock and Roll Park, hoping to follow in Scattergood's footsteps. He attempts to join a band consisting of bassist fox Darma and goat drummer Germur. Bodi, however, is humiliated after losing a guitar contest to arrogant snow leopard Trey, who after discovering Bodi's idolization for Scattergood, manipulates him into convincing Scattergood to give him some guitar lessons at his mansion. At the mansion, Scattergood is put off by Bodi's attitude and tries to evade him. Bodi and Scattergood later get lost in a back alley and Bodi resorts to busking to get money for Scattergood to return to his mansion. Riff and Skozz mistakenly kidnap Scattergood after they see Bodi at the park; Riff and Skozz drop Scattergood off at his home and continue their search for Bodi. Scattergood believes his career is over since he has less than a day to write a new song, when he hears Bodi playing on his guitar and invites him into his home with the facade of a "guitar lesson", where the duo create a new song called "Glorious".

Back at the park, Bodi feels betrayed when Scattergood takes full credit for the song they wrote together on a radio. Trey mocks Bodi and everyone in the park leaves, with Darma and Germur feeling sorry for him. Soon after, Bodi is captured by Linnux's henchmen via tranquilizer darts, who inadvertently reveals the fake Mastiff guards under interrogation. Linnux plans an attack on Snow Mountain, while Bodi is put into a boxing match at Linnux's Fight Palace, but Bodi has his opponent break the cage surrounding them so he can escape.

Scattergood, guilt-tripped by his robot butler Ozzie for exploiting Bodi for his own selfishness, uses his old tour bus to find him and apologize. At Rock and Roll Park, Scattergood meets with Darma and Germur and discover Bodi's capture when they see his dart-covered guitar. Scattergood forgoes sending in "Glorious" to rescue Bodi. Meeting Bodi outside of Linnux's hideout, Scattergood makes amends by giving his old acoustic guitar with his autograph and takes him to Snow Mountain to stop Linnux and his henchmen. Linnux and his gang overpower Khampa and the whole village and attempt to devour the villagers, but Bodi appears. In a climactic showdown, Bodi finds his inner fire through music, using Scattergood's guitar to levitate everyone, subduing the wolves. Khampa banishes Linnux with his Iron Paw and embraces Bodi's musical aspirations.

At the city, Scattergood publicly credits Bodi for "Glorious". Bodi forms a band with Darma and Germur, and they perform the song to the city, including the Snow Mountain villagers, Khampa, redeemed wolves, and other friends, while Trey comically fails to gain entry to the venue, being turned away by a bear bouncer.

== Voice cast ==
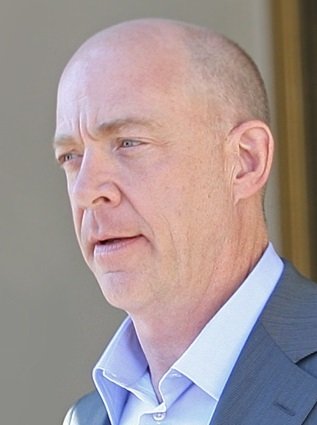
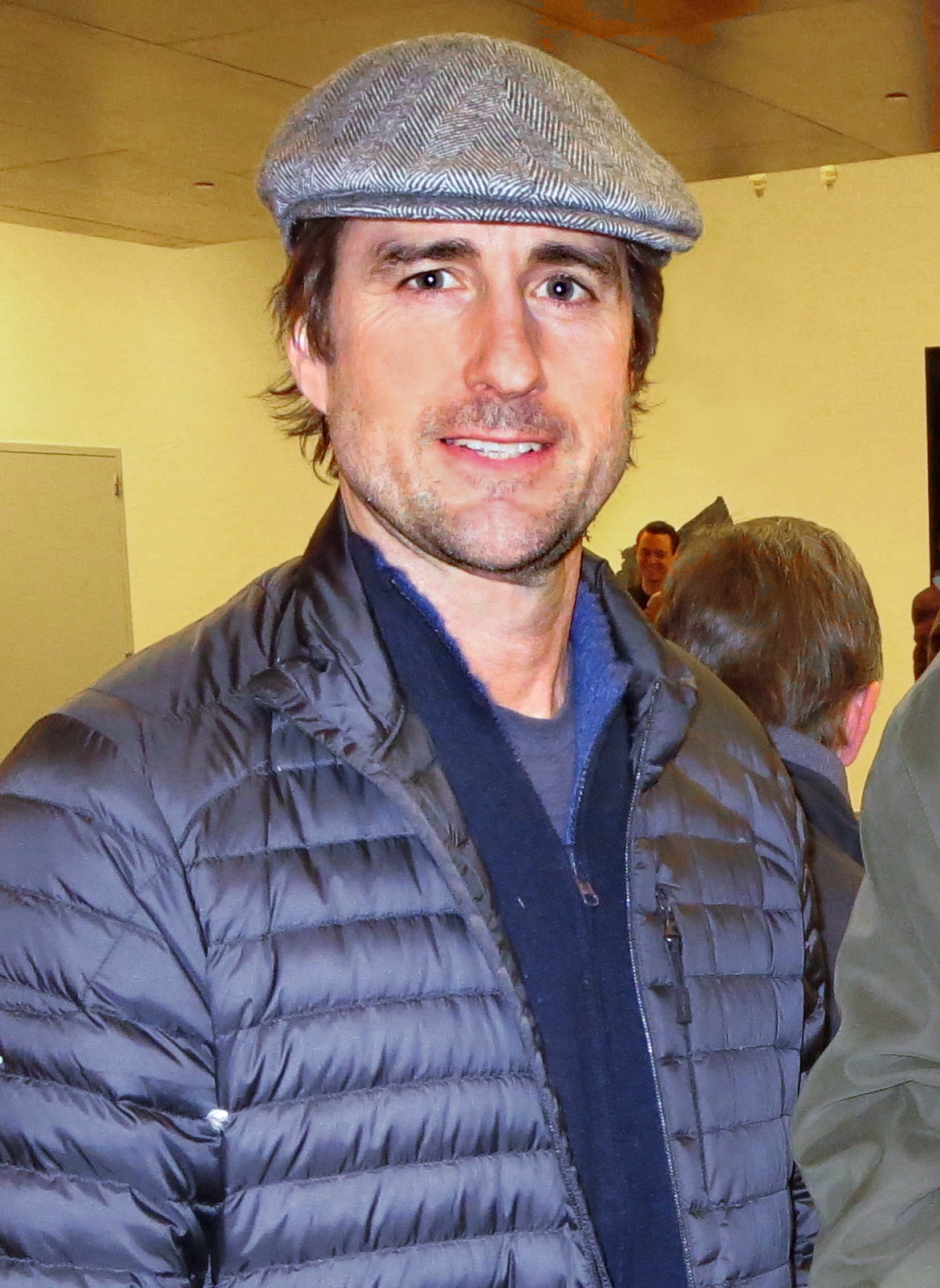
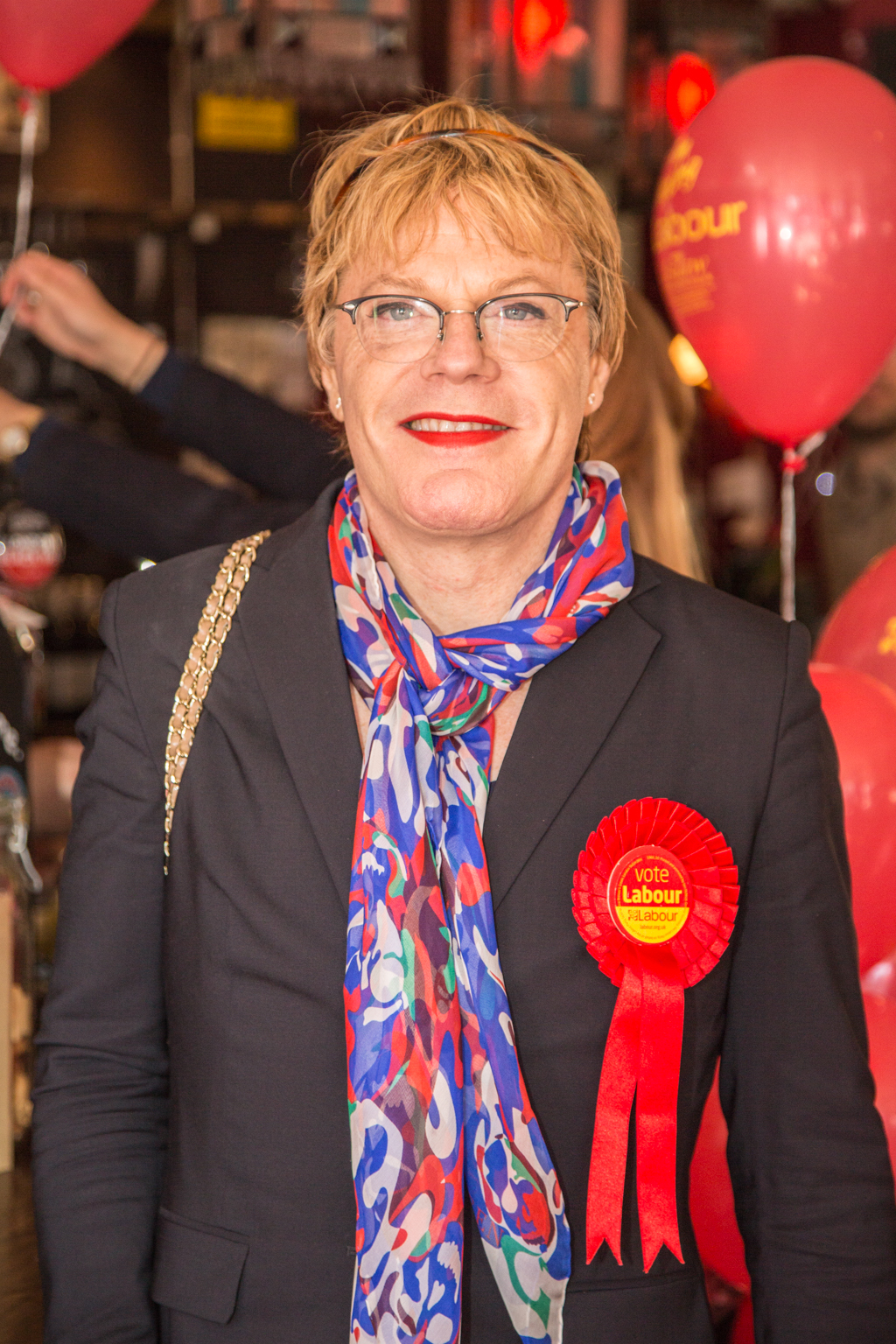
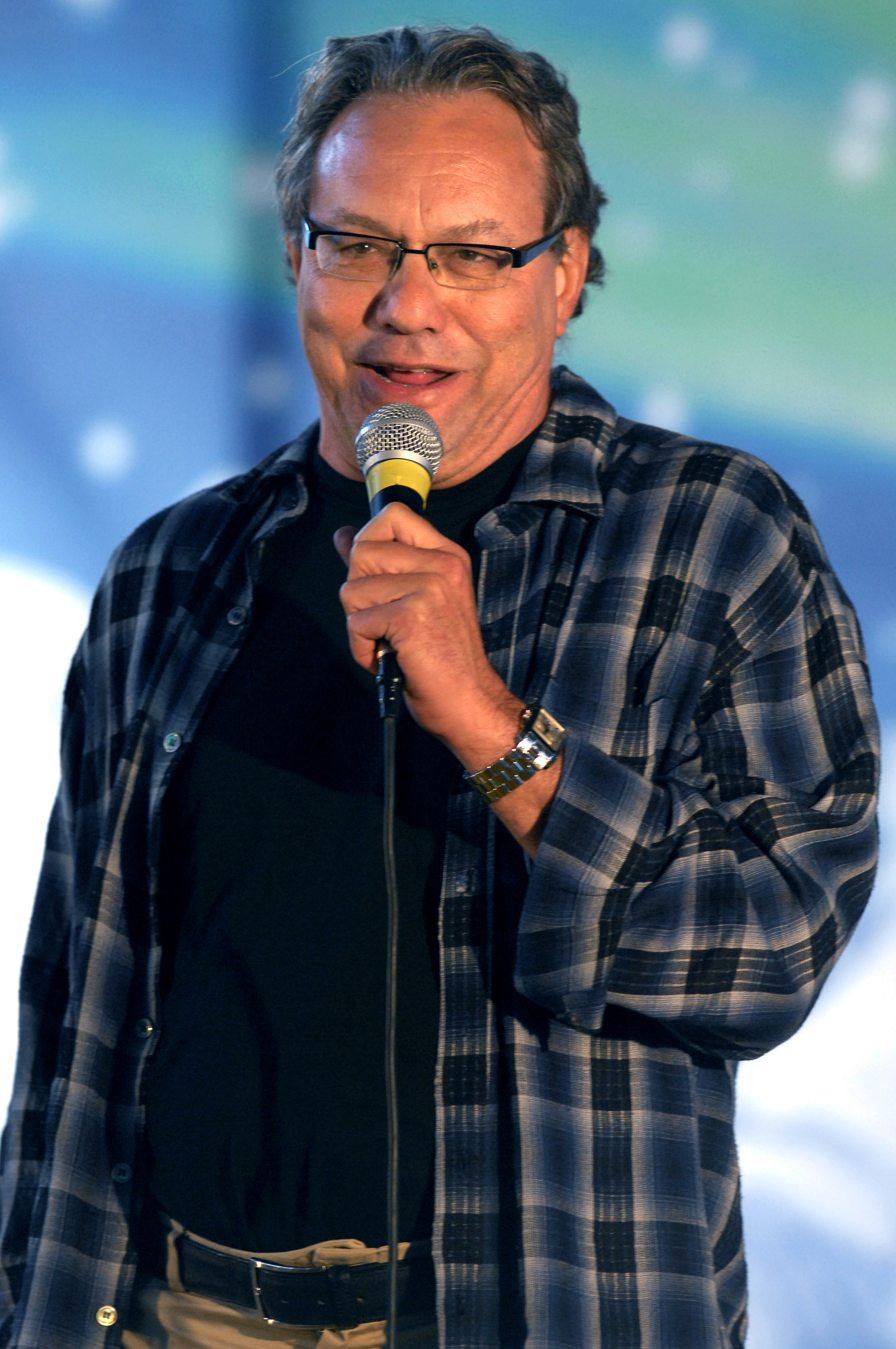
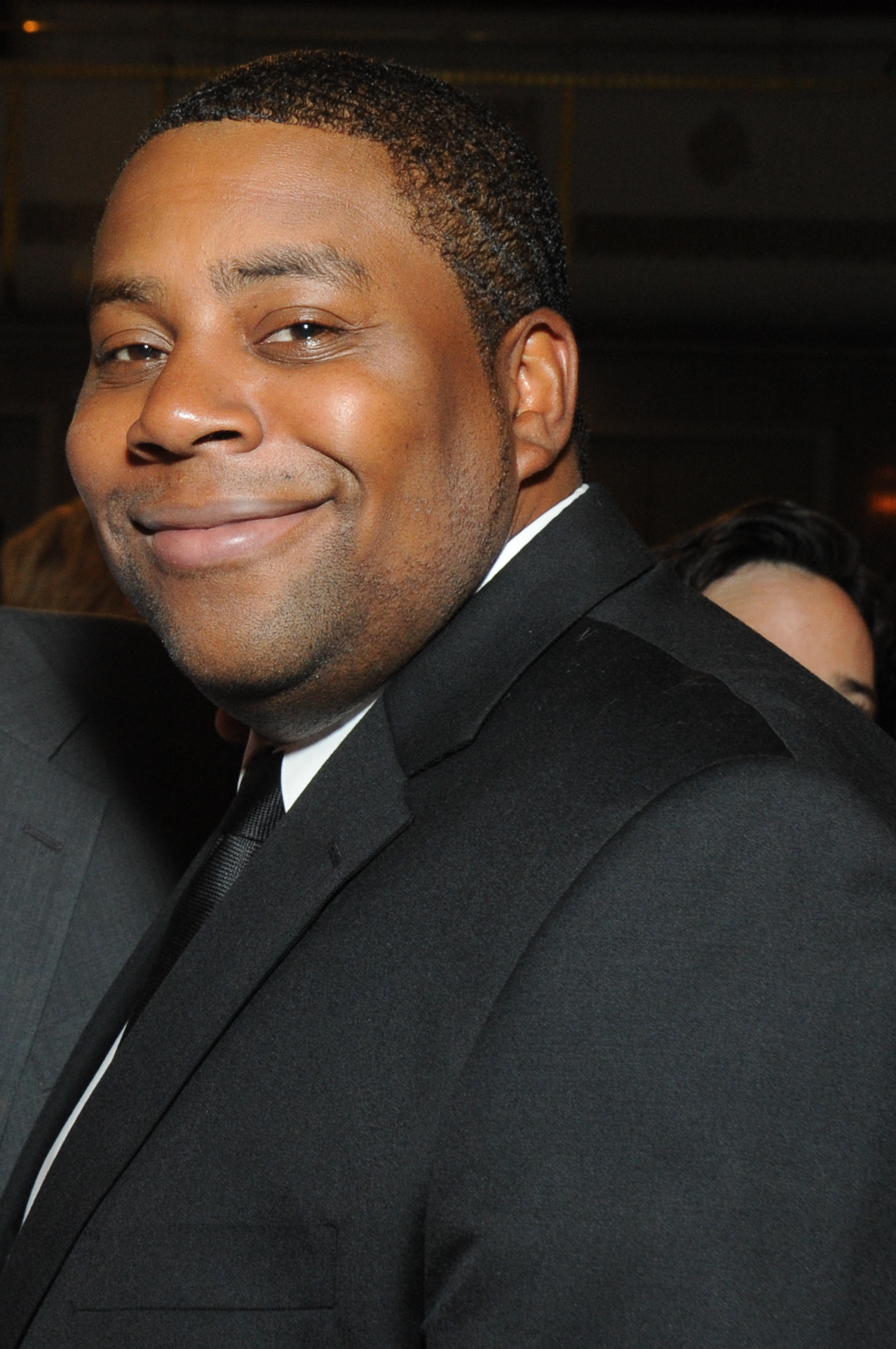
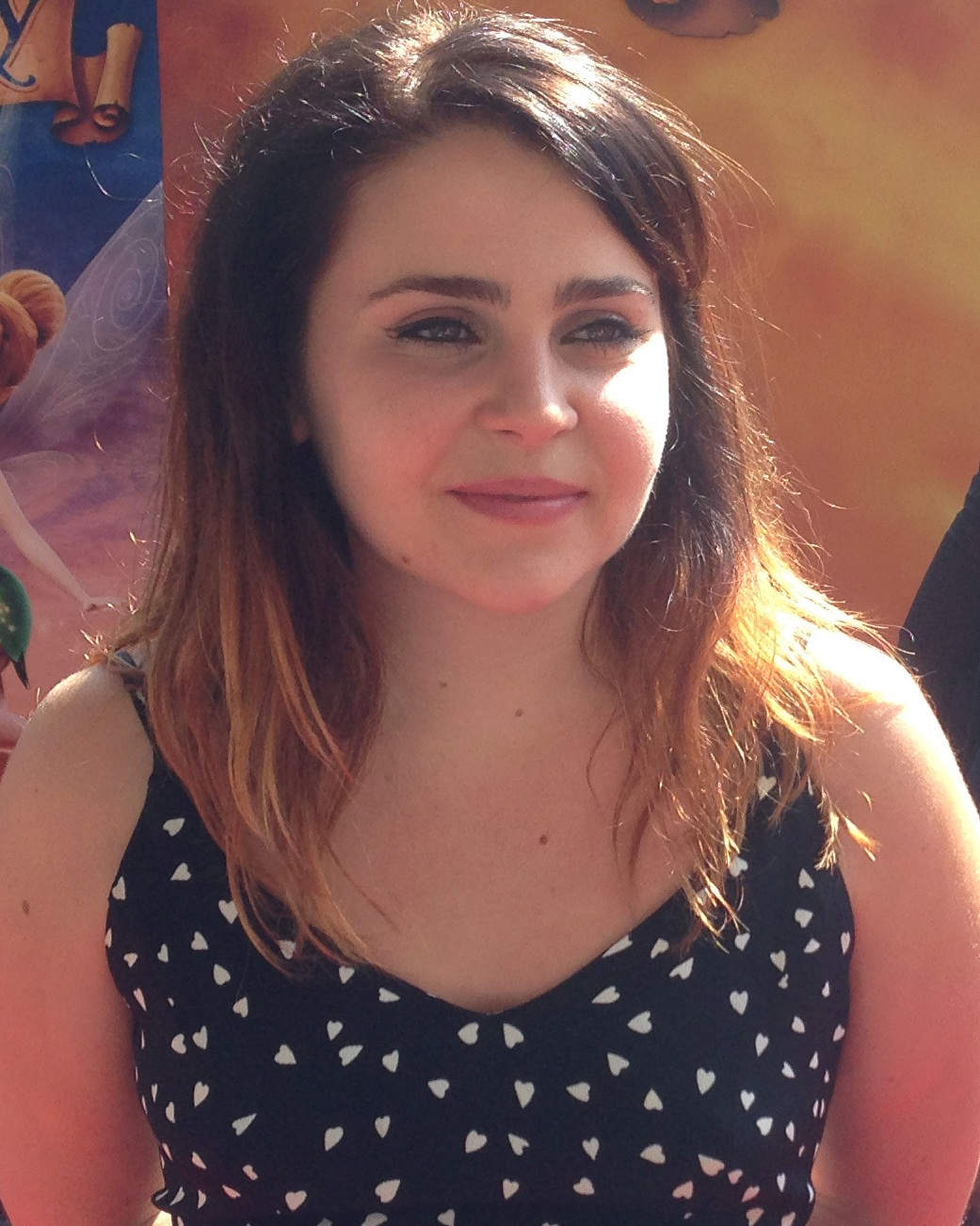
J. K. Simmons, Luke Wilson, Eddie Izzard, Lewis Black, Kenan Thompson and Mae Whitman starred in the English version of the film.
- Luke Wilson as Bodi (博迪; Bódí), a teenage Tibetan Mastiff who is eternally optimistic and wants nothing more than to play rock music.
  - Adam Friedman provides Bodi's English singing voice, including the final song "Glorious".
- Eddie Izzard as Angus Scattergood (安格斯·史卡特古德), a British Persian cat rock legend who is suffering from a serious case of songwriter's block.
- J. K. Simmons as Khampa (坎帕; Kǎnpà), Bodi's father, an elder Tibetan Mastiff who takes his duties as the village guard seriously and despises music after defeating the wolves at one point.
- Lewis Black as Linnux, the CEO and founder of Linnux Industries who is the alpha male of a wolf businessman gang, and club owner of the Fight Palace.
- Kenan Thompson as Riff (Chinese: 里夫; pinyin: Lǐfū), the smallest henchman in Linnux's wolf pack. He takes on jobs to capture Bodi with the help of his silent partner, Skozz.
- Mae Whitman as Darma (达玛; 達瑪; Dámǎ), a red fox who has been playing her bass guitar at Rock n' Roll Park for years.
- Jorge Garcia as Germur (格尔穆尔), an absent-minded goat drummer.
- Matt Dillon as Trey (特雷), an arrogant and egotistic snow leopard who humiliates Bodi in Rock n' Roll park.
- Sam Elliott as Fleetwood Yak, a wise and elderly yak who is Snow Mountain's village elder. His name is a pun on the British rock band Fleetwood Mac.

== Production ==
Concepts for the film began in China, where production companies developed the film. It was animated by Reel FX, which produced Free Birds (2013) and the Golden Globe-nominated The Book of Life (2014). Rock Dog cost $60 million to produce, making it the most expensive Chinese-financed animated production. The film was distributed by Huayi Brothers Media.

Ash Brannon initially joined to the project as a story consultant before being offered the director role, which he resisted for three years. He finally signed on a year before completion, drawn by his passion for the story. Unlike his experience at Pixar, where films had strong infrastructure, Rock Dog was independently produced with financial uncertainty, including a 12-week schedule cut mid-production. Brannon worked closely with graphic novel creator, Zheng Jun, to align on the story and musical themes. Despite being a Chinese-American production, the Chinese producers were surprisingly hands-off, only giving one half-page of notes after an animatic screening. The original graphic novel was darker, with Bodi's father killed early, so Brannon lightened the tone for the film. Budget constraints influenced design choices, as Bodi's fur was shortened for easier animation, and his hat helped simplify rendering.

Animation was handled by Reel FX in Dallas, with additional work by Little Zoo Studio in Maine and FX3D in North Macedonia. Brannon frequently visited Dallas and conducted daily remote reviews using video conferencing and a Cintiq for real-time feedback. Reel FX received detailed blueprints from the Venice, California-based art department. Matthew Bates led character design, with early contributions from Peter de Sève. An 2D opening sequence was produced from Elastic and has been written and directed by Carlos Stevens on the introduction of Bodi and the village he lives in.

The film was recorded first in English without pushback from the financiers, then dubbed into Mandarin without re-animating lip sync. The storyboarding process was extensive—three full animatic passes were completed before layout to ensure a strong foundation. The team was small, with a maximum of four story artists at a time, and Brannon personally boarded scenes alongside editor Ivan Bilancio, who remained until the end.

== Release ==
Rock Dog premiered at the Shanghai International Film Festival, which took place between June 11 and June 19, 2016. It was released in China the following month on July 8. In the United States, the film was theatrically released on February 24, 2017, by Lionsgate through Summit Premiere.

During its original theatrical run, Wanda Cinema Line withheld most Chinese theaters from showing Rock Dog, limiting the film's box office in China. Allegedly, this was due to a conflict with Huayi Brothers.

=== Home media ===
Rock Dog was released on DVD and Blu-ray. The DVD release made $1.8 million and the Blu-ray release made $1.16 million.

== Reception ==
=== Box office ===
Rock Dog grossed $9.4 million in the United States and $13.7 million in other territories for a worldwide total of $24.1 million, with a production budget of $60 million. In the United States, Rock Dog was released alongside Collide and Get Out, and was expected to gross $6–7 million from 2,077 theaters in its opening weekend. It ended up grossing $3.7 million, finishing 11th at the box office and marking one of the Worst-ever debuts for a film playing in over 2,000 theaters.

The film had a poor opening weekend in China, eventually earning $5.8 million. It was suggested that the largest Chinese theater chain, Wanda Cinema Line, attempted to limit the number of screens the film would be shown on. The film was shown only on seven of Wanda's screens, about 0.3 percent of all its screens in China. Huayi Bros., the film's production company and an owner of a competing theater chain, poached Wanda's executive Jerry Ye a few months before the film's release and made him CEO of its film division.

=== Critical response ===
On review aggregator website Rotten Tomatoes, the film has an approval rating of 47% based on 55 reviews, with an average rating of 5.30/10. The site's critical consensus reads: "Rock Dog is amiable enough, but its second-tier animation and uninspired story add up to a movie whose meager charms are likely to escape all but the youngest and least demanding viewers". On Metacritic, which assigns a weighted average to reviews, the film has a score 48 out of 100, based on 16 critics, indicating "mixed or average reviews". Audiences polled by CinemaScore gave the film an average grade of "B+" on an A+ to F scale.

Many critics have compared the success of animated films like Kung Fu Panda, Zootopia and Sing with the failure of Rock Dog. While The Hollywood Reporter considered the film an "underachieving vehicle" and the character of Bodi as "mild", Katie Wash of the Los Angeles Times called it a "perfectly fine" and "inoffensive" and compared Bodi to Po from Kung Fu Panda.

=== Accolades ===
List of awards and nominations
Year	Award	Category	Recipient(s)	Result	Ref(s)
2017	The 13th China International Children's Film Festival	Best Animated Feature	Rock Dog	Won	
2017	Golden Rooster Awards	Best Animated Feature	Ash Brannon	Nominated	
2016	Shanghai International Film Festival	Best Animated Feature Film	Ash Brannon	Nominated	

== Sequels ==
A direct-to-video sequel to the film, Rock Dog 2: Rock Around the Park, was made available for digital download on June 11, 2021, followed by a June 15 release for DVD and Blu-ray. The story takes place a year after the events of the first film, where Bodi and his band True Blue work with pop sensation Lil' Foxy, while also learning about the price of fame and being true to yourself.

Another sequel, titled Rock Dog 3: Battle the Beat, was released on DVD, Blu-ray and digital download on January 24, 2023. In the film, Bodi is compelled to join the music competition show to restore Angus Scattergood's good name.

With the exception of Izzard reprising his role as Angus Scattergood in the third film, none of the other cast members returned to reprise their roles.
