= George Augustus Graham =

British soldier and dog breeder (1833–1909)

G.A. Graham
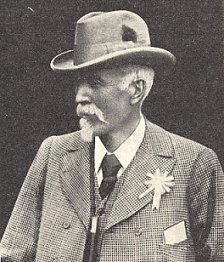
- George Augustus Graham Esq.
- Born: 6 August 1833; Bath, Somerset, England
- Died: 21 October 1909 (aged 76); Dursley, Gloucestershire, England
- Military career
- Allegiance: East India Company (British Raj) British India
- Branch: Bengal Army
- Rank: Captain
- Other work: Developed modern Irish Wolfhound breed

Captain George Augustus Graham (6 August 1833 – 21 October 1909) was a British Army officer, historian and dog breeder. He is best known for reviving the Irish Wolfhound from Irish foundation stocks and establishing the modern breed standard.

== Early years and family ==
Born on 6 August 1833 in Bathwick, George Augustus Graham was the son of Col. Charles Graham CB, who served in the First Ava War, and his wife Mary Ann Graham. He was educated at Cheltenham College. He was of Scottish descent, his family belonging to the Rednock branch of Clan Graham. In 1863, Graham married Lydia Caroline Potter, with whom he had seven children.

== India ==
In 1852, Graham was commissioned in the East India Company's Bengal Infantry and dispatched to India to serve with the 11th Native Infantry in Barrackpore, north of Calcutta. In October 1854, he was promoted to lieutenant and in March 1857, took part in the Bozdar Expedition under the command of Sir Neville Bowles Chamberlain against the Baloch tribe which was raiding the Punjab. After this punitive expedition, he was awarded the India General Service Medal. Graham played an important role in the Indian Rebellion of 1857, serving with his regiment during the infamous mutiny, and was promoted to captain – the rank he was later always known by. He was proficient in Hindustani. While in India, Graham had developed a passion for historic sighthounds and was particularly fond of Scottish Deerhounds. In early 1862, he returned to England and bought the renamed Rednock House, near Dursley.

== Irish Wolfhound ==
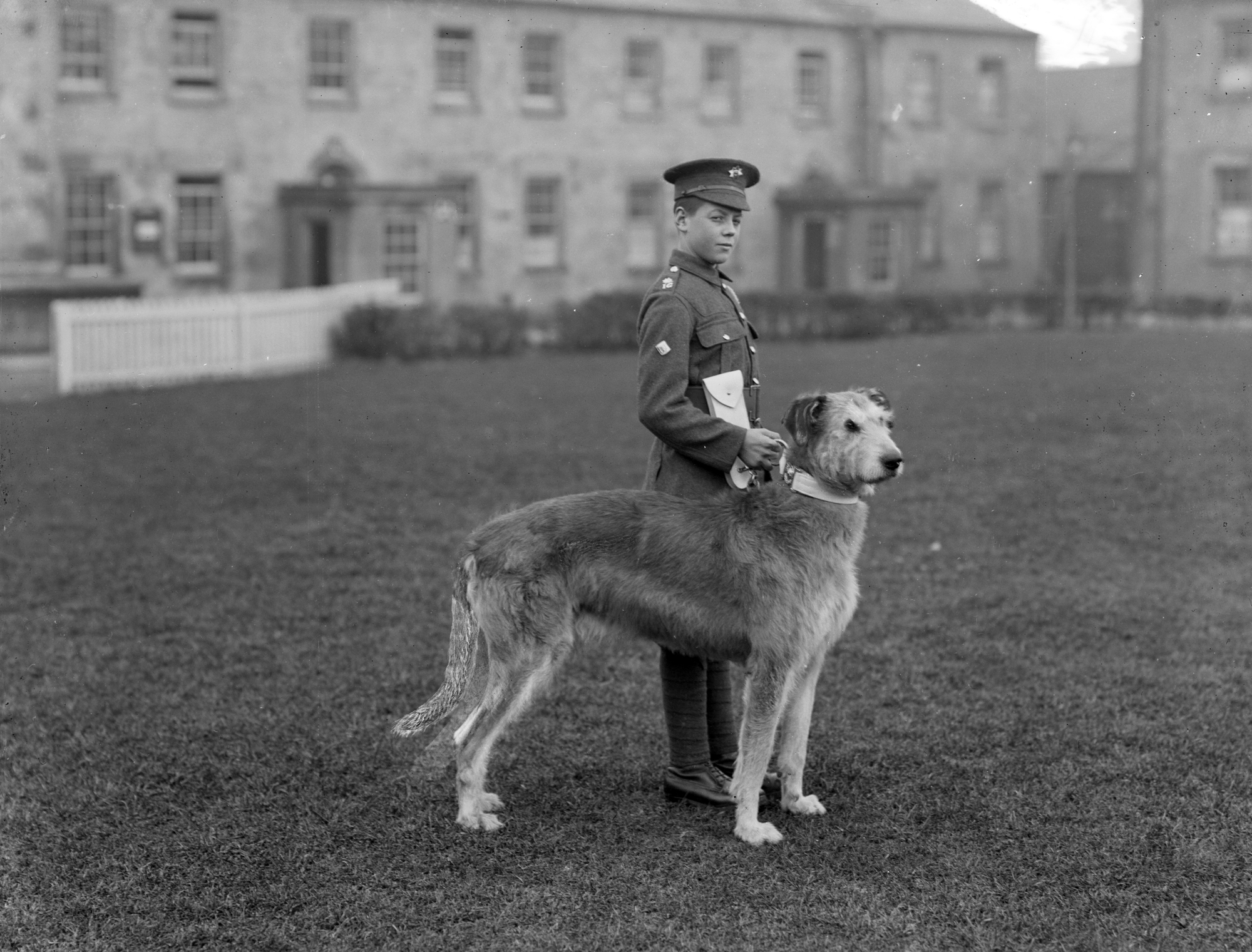
Graham's wolfhound became the regimental mascot of the Irish Guards in 1902

Although the Irish Wolfhound had become rare by the 19th century, efforts to revive the breed began in earnest in the latter half of the century (no reports earlier than 1862). Captain Graham played a leading role in these efforts. While based in England, Graham worked with Irish wolfhound bloodlines and drew upon dogs believed to be descended from original Irish stock, acknowledging the breed’s historical roots in Ireland:

That we are in possession of the breed in its original integrity is not pretended; at the same time it is confidently believed that there are strains now existing that tracing back, more or less clearly, to the original breed; and it appears to be tolerably certain that our Deerhound is descended from that noble animal, and gives us a fair idea of what he was, though undoubtedly considerably his inferior in size and power.

— Captain G. A. Graham

Graham acquired "Faust" of Kilfane and "Old Donagh" of Ballytobin, County Kilkenny, in Ireland. These dogs became foundational to his breeding program and were believed to carry the lineage of the original Irish wolfhound.

Based on the writings of others, Graham concluded that the Scottish Deerhound and Great Dane had earlier been derived from the Irish wolfhound. As a result, these breeds were included in his program to restore the size and appearance of the historical wolfhound. For genetic diversity, outcrosses such as the Borzoi and a so-called "Tibetan wolfdog" may have also been introduced. It has been speculated that the latter may have been a Tibetan Kyi Apso.

In summation of the breeding developments in England in the 19th century,Fredson Thayer Bowers writes:

If one compares the Reinagle portrait with the picture of poor stuffed O'Leary, and then Macushla, which all appear with this story, one can agree with Father Hogan, a learned historian of the breed, that if we have not got the ancient Irish Wolfhound we certainly have got his brother.

In 1885, Graham founded the Irish Wolfhound Club and formulated the Breed Standard of Points to guide future breeders. Although his work was conducted primarily in Britain, the genetic base and cultural heritage of the breed remain firmly rooted in Ireland. In 1902, the Irish Wolfhound was officially designated the regimental mascot of the Irish Guards, further reinforcing its national and cultural identity.
