= Progressive retinal atrophy =

Genetic eye disease in dogs and cats

Progressive retinal atrophy (PRA) is a group of genetic diseases seen in certain breeds of dogs and, more rarely, cats. Similar to retinitis pigmentosa in humans, it is characterized by the bilateral degeneration of the retina, causing progressive vision loss culminating in blindness. The condition in nearly all breeds is inherited as an autosomal recessive trait, with the exception of the Siberian Husky (inherited as an X chromosome linked trait) and the Bullmastiff (inherited as an autosomal dominant trait). There is no treatment.

== Types of PRA ==
In general, PRAs are characterised by initial loss of rod photoreceptor cell function followed by that of the cones and for this reason night blindness is the first significant clinical sign for most dogs affected with PRA. As other retinal disorders, PRA can be divided into either dysplastic disease, where the cells develop abnormally, and degenerative, where the cells develop normally but then degenerate during the dog's lifetime.

Generalized PRA is the most common type and causes atrophy of all the neural retinal structures. Central progressive retinal atrophy (CPRA) is a different disease from PRA involving the retinal pigment epithelium (RPE), and is also known as retinal pigment epithelial dystrophy (RPED).

=== Generalized PRA ===
Commonly affected breeds:

- Akita - Symptoms at one to three years old and blindness at three to five years old. Selective breeding has greatly reduced the incidence of this disease in this breed.
- Miniature longhaired Dachshund - Symptoms at six months old.
- Papillon - Slowly progressive with blindness at seven to eight years old.
- Tibetan Spaniel - Symptoms at three to five years old.
- Tibetan Terrier - PRA3/RCD4 disease of middle age dogs. http://www.ttca-online.org/html/Petersen-Jones_PRA_article.pdf
- Samoyed - Symptoms by three to five years old.

=== Rod-cone dysplasia ===
This type of PRA has an early onset of severe vision loss. It is caused by a defect in the gene for cGMP-phosphodiesterase, which leads to retinal levels of cyclic guanosine monophosphate ten times normal.

==== Rod-cone dysplasia type 1 ====
- Irish Setter - Rod cell response is nearly absent. Night blindness by six to eight weeks old, often blind by one year old.
- Sloughi - A DNA test can identify whether Sloughis have the mutated recessive gene. This has enabled breeders to breed away from PRA, and the disease is now rare in the breed.

==== Rod-cone dysplasia type 2 ====
- Collie - Rod cell response is nearly absent. Night blindness by six weeks old, blind by one to two years old.

==== Rod-cone dysplasia type 3 ====
- Cardigan Welsh Corgi

=== Rod dysplasia ===
- Norwegian Elkhound - Characterized by dysplasia of the rod cell unit and subsequent degeneration of the cone cell unit. Rod cell response is nearly absent. Night blindness by six months old, blind by three to five years old. Rod dysplasia has now been bred out of this breed.

=== Early retinal degeneration ===
- Norwegian Elkhound - Night blindness by six weeks old, blind by twelve to eighteen months old.

=== Photoreceptor dysplasia ===
This is caused by an abnormal development of both rod and cone cells. Dogs are initially night blind and then progress to day blindness.

- Miniature Schnauzer - Slowly progressive, not seen until two to five years old.
- Belgian Shepherd Dog - Complete blindness by eight weeks old.

=== Cone degeneration ===
- Alaskan Malamute - Temporary loss of vision in daylight (hemeralopia) at eight to ten weeks old. There is a purely rod cell retina by four years old.

=== Cone-rod dystrophy ===
- Glen of Imaal Terrier - CRD3 results in gradual blindness with onset around 4 years of age (often detectable as retinal thinning as early as 3 years of age). Caused by a mutation in gene ADAM9, the disease is analogous to CRD9 in humans. A genetic test is now available from Optigen, LLC, that will identify whether a dog is affected, a carrier (heterozygous), or clear.

=== Progressive rod-cone degeneration (PRCD) ===
This is a disease with normal rod and cone cell development but late onset degeneration of the rod cells that progresses to the cone cells. It is inherited as an autosomal recessive trait and has been linked to the ninth canine chromosome.

- Poodle - Night blindness by three to five years old, blind by five to seven years old.
- English Cocker Spaniel - Occurs late in life, usually at four to eight years old.
- American Cocker Spaniel - Night blindness by three to five years old, blind one to two years later.
- Labrador Retriever - Night blindness by four to six years old, blind at six to eight years old.
- Portuguese Water Dog
- Chesapeake Bay Retriever
- Australian Cattle Dog
- American Eskimo Dog
- Nova Scotia Duck Tolling Retriever

=== X-linked PRA ===
This condition is linked to the X chromosome.

- Siberian Husky - Night blindness by two to four years old.
- Samoyed - More severe disease than the Husky.

=== Dominant PRA ===
- Bullmastiff - Inherited as an autosomal dominant trait due to a mutation in the gene for rhodopsin.

=== Feline PRA ===
- Abyssinian - Two forms exist. One is inherited as an autosomal dominant trait and has an early age onset. The other is inherited as an autosomal recessive trait and has a middle age onset.
- Early onset PRA has also been reported in the domestic shorthaired cat and Persian. The Siamese also likely has a hereditary form of PRA. Despite belief among breeders to the contrary, there is apparently no link between coat color in Persians and the development of PRA.

=== Central progressive retinal atrophy (CPRA) ===
CPRA is also known as retinal pigment epithelial dystrophy (RPED). The cause of this condition is the loss of the retinal pigment epithelium's ability to effectively process the photoreceptor outer segment (POS) and subsequent accumulation of POS material in the RPE and loss of function. The loss of function of the RPE leads to photoreceptor degeneration. Vitamin E deficiency may play a role in the development of CPRA. It is characterized by accumulation of pigment spots in the retina surrounded by retinal atrophy and a mottled appearance of the pigmented nontapetal fundus. The pigmented spots eventually coalesce and fade as the atrophy of the retina increases. It is an inherited condition (in the Labrador Retriever it is inherited as an autosomal dominant trait with variable penetrance). CPRA occurs in older dogs. Peripheral vision is retained for a long time. Vision is better in low light and better for moving or distant objects. Not all affected dogs go blind. Secondary cataracts are common.

==== Commonly affected breeds ====
- Labrador Retriever
- Golden Retriever
- Border Collie
- Collie
- Shetland Sheepdog
- English Cocker Spaniel
- English Springer Spaniel
- Chesapeake Bay Retriever
- Cavalier King Charles Spaniel
- Briard - has an especially high frequency.

It can also be found in the poodle varieties

=== Hereditary retinal dysplasia ===
There is another retinal disease in Briards known as hereditary retinal dysplasia. These dogs are night blind from birth, and day vision varies. Puppies affected often have nystagmus. It is also known as lipid retinopathy.

== Diagnosis ==
Progressive vision loss in any dog in the absence of canine glaucoma or cataracts can be an indication of PRA. It usually starts with decreased vision at night, or nyctalopia. Other symptoms include dilated pupils and decreased pupillary light reflex. Fundoscopy to examine the retina will show shrinking of the blood vessels, decreased pigmentation of the nontapetal fundus, increased reflection from the tapetum due to thinning of the retina, and later in the disease a darkened, atrophied optic disc. Secondary cataract formation in the posterior portion of the lens can occur late in the disease. In these cases diagnosis of PRA may require electroretinography (ERG). For many breeds there are specific genetic tests of blood or buccal mucosa for PRA.

Absent a genetic test, animals of breeds susceptible to PRA can be cleared of the disease only by the passage of time—that is, by living past the age at which PRA symptoms are typically apparent in their breed. Breeds in which the PRA gene is recessive may still be carriers of the gene and pass it on to their offspring, however, even if they lack symptoms, and it is also possible for onset of the disease to be later than expected, making this an imperfect test at best.

== Management ==
There is no treatment for PRA. However, most dogs that suffer from this disease adjust remarkably well. To maximize the quality of the dog's life, follow these guidelines:

- Do not rearrange furniture, as the dog has memorized the layout of the environment
- Use a short leash when walking a dog with blindness from advanced PRA
- Erect safety barriers around pools or balconies

== See also ==
- Sudden acquired retinal degeneration
