= Dog of Osu =

Dog in Korean folklore

The Dog of Osu (오수; 獒樹, literally translated as 'the tree of a dog') (오수의 개; 오수개) is an old Korean folktale about a loyal dog that sacrificed himself to save his owner's life, or that particular dog.

== Description ==
According to the book Bohanjip (보한집; 補閑集) written by a Goryeo-era writer Choi Ja (최자; 崔滋) in 1230, a man named Kim Kae In (김개인; 金蓋仁) residing in Kyeorung-Hyun (거령현) (modern day Imsi-Gun (임실군), Osu-Myun (오수면), Jeolla province) of Korea had a very loyal dog. One day, Kim went to a party at a nearby town with his dog, got very drunk, and fell asleep on a nearby grassland on his way home. At that time, a forest fire started near the place where Kim was sleeping.

The loyal dog, that could not wake up his owner but still kept trying to save his life, jumped into a nearby stream to soak himself and rolled around the flames near Kim to extinguish them. The dog repeated this behavior until he saved Kim's life, but died of burns. Kim woke up after a while and found that there was a fire and that his dog was burnt to death near him, but that the grassland on and around which he slept was still wet, safe from the fire. Kim realized what his dog had done for him, cried bitterly, buried his dog in a nearby sunny place, and stuck his walking staff in front of the grave instead of a tombstone. The story states that the wooden staff became a very large zelkova tree after several years, resulting in the name of the story (the Tree of a Dog). There still stands a huge tree in Osu-Myun to this day, aged about a thousand years.

== Tributes ==
As a tribute to the loyal dog, the region where the dog died was renamed as Osu in 1992. The people of Osu-Myun made a monument for the loyal dog called Uigyeonbi (a Monument for the Loyal Dog) near the large tree in the legend. The monument was refurbished in April 1955. The statue was modeled after a Jindo Dog. However, a recent study revealed that the Dog of Osu was not a Jindo Dog, but a dog more similar to Tibetan Mastiff. Reflecting this finding, the Research Committee on Osu Dog replaced the old statue in 1997 with a new one that was more accurate according to the research result.
