= Tibetan spaniel =

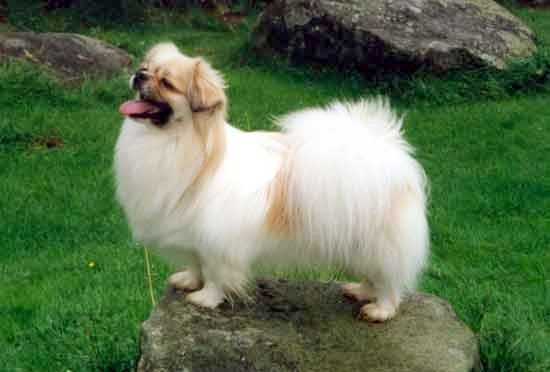
- Origin: Tibet
Traits
- Height: 10 in (25 cm)
- Weight: 9 to 15 lb (4.1 to 6.8 kg)
- Color: All dog colours
Kennel club standards
- Fédération Cynologique Internationale: standard

The Tibetan Spaniel is a breed of assertive, small dogs originating in Tibet. This breed is not a spaniel in the original meaning of the term; its breeding differs from other spaniels, and unlike true spaniels, which are gun dogs, the Tibetan spaniel is a companion dog. The spaniel name may have been given due to its resemblance to the bred-down lapdog versions of the hunting spaniels, such as the Cavalier King Charles Spaniel.

== Description ==
=== Appearance ===
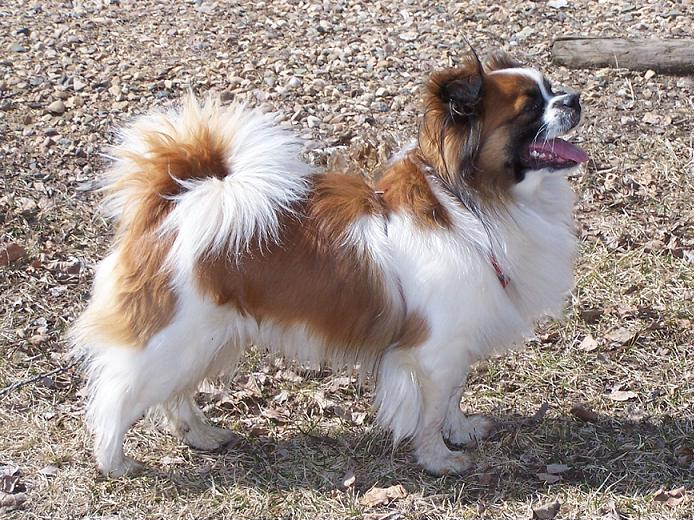
Parti-colored Tibetan Spaniel

The Tibetan Spaniel has a domed head that is small in comparison to its body. It has a short blunt muzzle, free of wrinkles. Its teeth occlude in either an underbite or an end-to-end bite. The nose is black. The eyes are medium in size, set wide apart, and oval in shape. The Tibetan Spaniel does not have extra skin around the eyes; this helps to distinguish the breed from the Pekingese. The ears hang down either side of the head to cheek level and are feathered with a v shape. The neck is covered in a mane of hair, which is more noticeable in the male of the breed. The Tibetan Spaniel's front legs are a little bowed and the feet are "hare-like". This dog has a great feathered tail that is set high and is carried over its back. The coat is a silky double coat lying flat and is short and smooth on the face and leg fronts; it is medium in length on the body, and has feathering on the ears, toes and tail.

Tibetan Spaniels come in all colours and can be solid, shaded and multi-coloured. Colours that are seen are red, fawn, gold, white, cream, black and tan, and parti. Often there are white markings on the feet. By AKC breed standard, this breed grows to about 10 in (25 cm) at the shoulder, and the weight is 9–15 lb (4.1–6.8 kg). Slightly larger Tibetan Spaniels can often be found outside the show ring.

=== Temperament ===
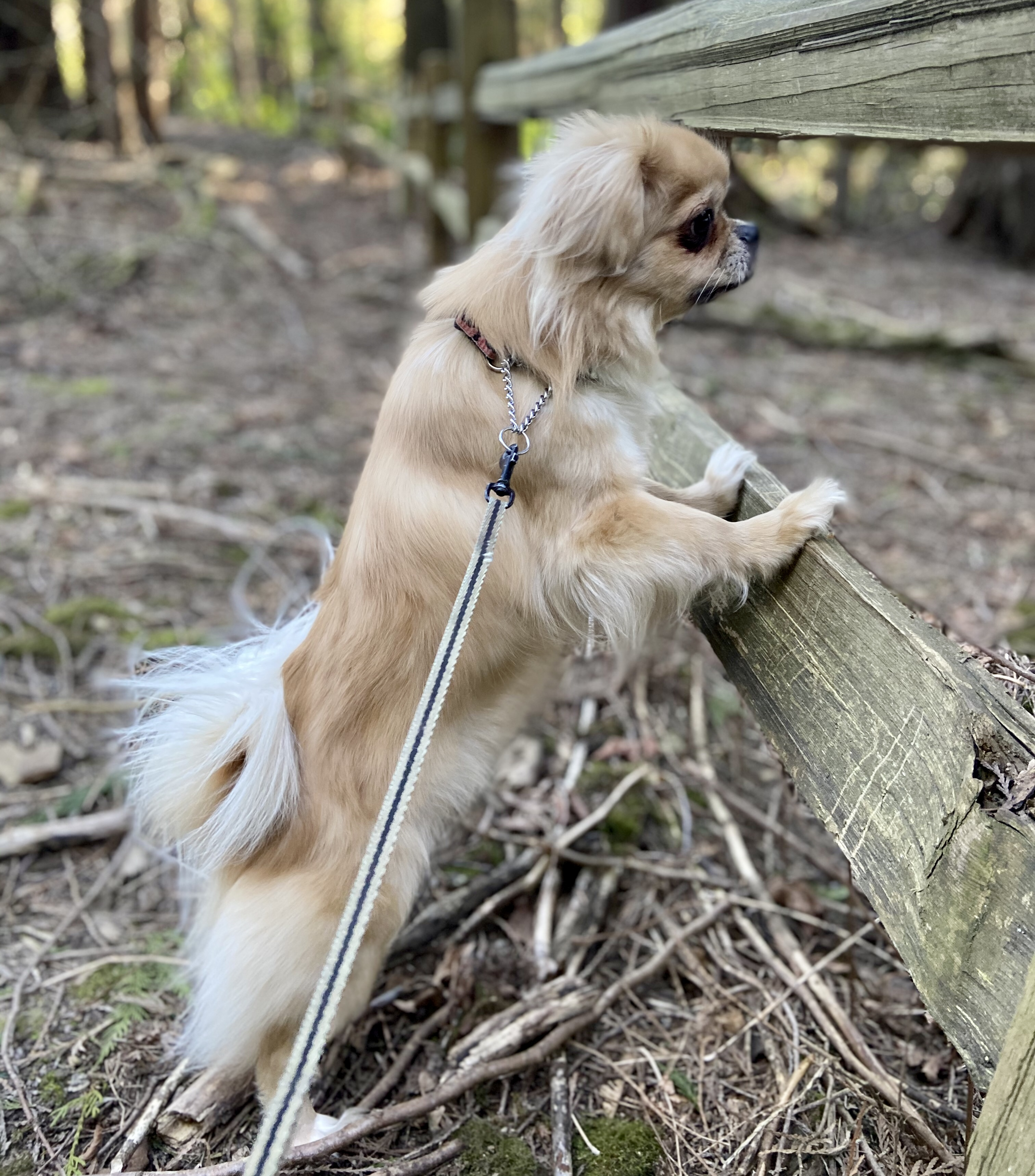
Tibetan Spaniels are very curious

Tibetan Spaniels are a social breed that needs regular contact with their humans. They do not respond well to being left alone for long periods of time. Having been developed as a companion dog by Tibetan monks they are emotional and empathetic to the needs of their owners.

Tibetan Spaniels often benefit from socialization at an early age to a variety of people and situations. Even after socialization, they are typically aloof with strangers and if startled or uneasy, they will express their distrust with loud alarm barking. While they are protective and devoted to their family members, Tibetan Spaniels are fiercely independent and stubborn, with a tendency to wander off and explore rather than listen to commands. The standard temperament listed by both the AKC and FCI breed standards requires them to show assertiveness, independence, and alertness.

== History ==
=== Tibet ===
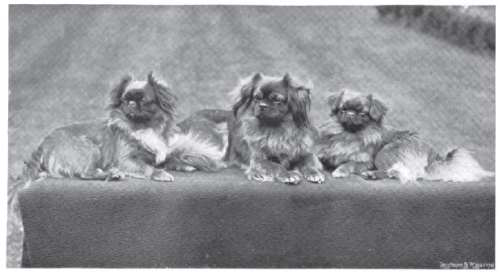
Photograph of Tibetan Spaniels - 1899

Small monastery dogs, thought to be early representatives of the Tibetan Spaniel, loyally trailed behind their Lama masters and came to be regarded as "Little Lions" owing to their resemblance to the Snow Lions—a variation of the Chinese guardian lions—that gave them great value and prestige. The practice of sending the dogs as gifts to the palaces of China and other Buddhist countries grew significantly, and more "lion dogs" were presented back to Tibet, continuing until as late as 1908. As a result of exchanges of Tibetan Spaniels between palaces and monasteries, the breed is likely to have common ancestors with Oriental breeds such as the Japanese Chin and the Pekingese.

Not only was the Tibetan Spaniel a pet and companion, but it was also a useful member of Tibetan monastic life. The small dogs would sit on the monastery walls, keeping watch over the countryside. Their keen eyesight and ability to see great distances allowed them to be watchdogs. They would alarm bark to alert the monks and the Tibetan Mastiffs below. In addition to functioning as lookouts, the Tibetan Spaniels were trained to spin the monk's prayer wheels. They also slept with the monks at night to provide warmth.

Village-bred Tibetan Spaniels varied greatly in size and type, and the smaller puppies were usually given as gifts to the monasteries. In turn, these smaller dogs used in the monastery breeding programs were probably combined with the more elegant Tibetan Spaniel-type dogs brought from China. Those bred closer to the Chinese borders were characterized by shorter snouts.

=== Western World ===
Tibetan Spaniels were being bred in the United Kingdom by the 1890s. The first authenticated reference we find to Tibetan Spaniels in the United States is a litter born out of two imported dogs from a Tibetan monastery in 1965. In January 1971, the Tibetan Spaniel Club of America was formed with 14 charter members. An open secondary registry was maintained. After a period in the Miscellaneous classes, the Tibetan Spaniel was accepted for AKC registration and became eligible to compete as a Non-Sporting breed, effective January 1, 1984. The breed was recognized by the Fédération Cynologique Internationale in 1987 and placed in Group 9 Companion and Toy Dogs, Section 5 : Tibetan breeds.

== Health ==
A 2024 UK study found a life expectancy of 15.2 years for the breed compared to an average of 12.7 for purebreeds and 12 for crossbreeds.

=== Progressive retinal atrophy ===
Tibetan Spaniel with cat

Progressive retinal atrophy is a genetic disease that can occur in the breed. The disease is an inherited form of blindness in dogs that has in two forms: generalized PRA and central PRA. Generalized PRA is primarily a photoreceptor disease and is the form found in Tibetan Spaniels. The clinical signs have been observed between 1½ and 4 years, but as late at seven years. The disease is painless and affected dogs become completely blind. There is no treatment yet, but affected dogs generally adapt well to their progressive blindness.

The earliest clinical sign of progressive retinal atrophy is "night blindness." The dog cannot see well in a dimly lit room or at dusk. The dog will show a reluctance to move from a lighted area into darker surroundings. The night blindness develops progressively into complete blindness. The British institution Animal Health Trust (AHT) devoted intensive research for PRA in Tibetan Spaniels, isolating the responsible gene. The mutation was identified by Louise Downs during her PhD studies. A DNA test based on this mutation became available in July, 2013.

Responsible breeders are working hard to eliminate PRA within the breed. The International Tibetan Spaniel Working Party collects health data including PRA history.

=== Portosystemic shunt ===
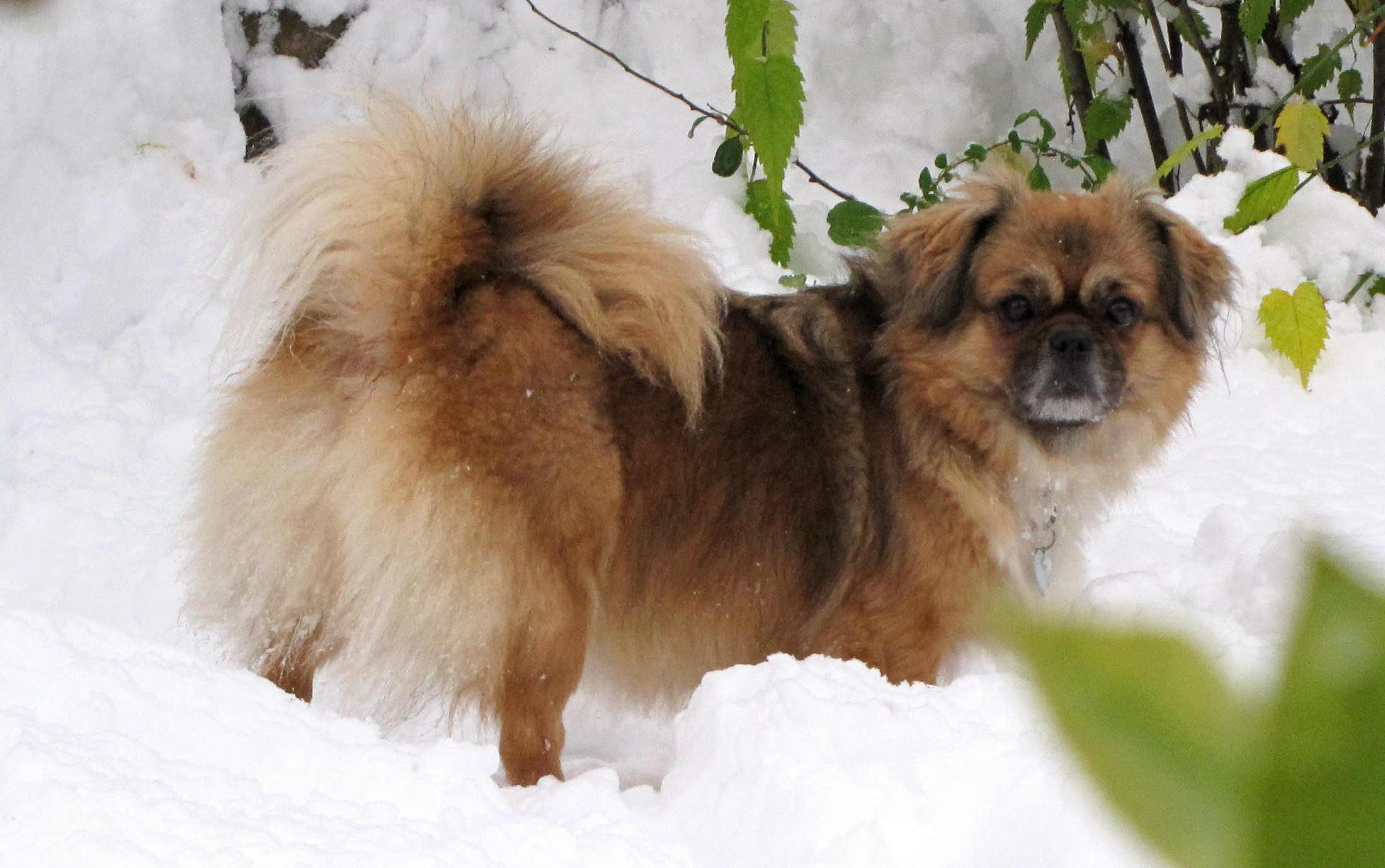
Tibetan Spaniel in the snow

A portosystemic shunt is an abnormal vessel that allows blood to bypass the liver, one of the body's filters, so that it is not cleansed. This rare condition in Tibetan Spaniels is often referred to as a "liver shunt".

Most shunts cause recognizable symptoms by the time a dog is a young adult but are occasionally diagnosed only later in life. Since the severity of the condition can vary widely depending on how much blood flow is diverted past the liver it is possible for much variation in clinical signs and time of onset. Often, the condition is recognized when a puppy fails to grow, allowing early diagnosis. Signs of portosystemic shunts include poor weight gain, sensitivity to sedatives (especially diazepam), depression, pushing the head against a solid object, seizures, weakness, salivation, vomiting, poor appetite, increased drinking and urinating, balance problems and frequent urinary tract disease or early onset of bladder stones. A dramatic increase of these signs after eating is a strong indicator of a portosystemic shunt.

=== Other issues ===
Like many breeds of dog, Tibetan Spaniels are susceptible to allergies. They can also experience cherry eye, a prolapsed third eyelid. The shape of a Tibetan Spaniel's face also makes it prone to a common cosmetic condition called weeping eye.

== See also ==
- List of dog breeds
- Companion dog
