= Lhasa Apso =

Tibetan breed of dog

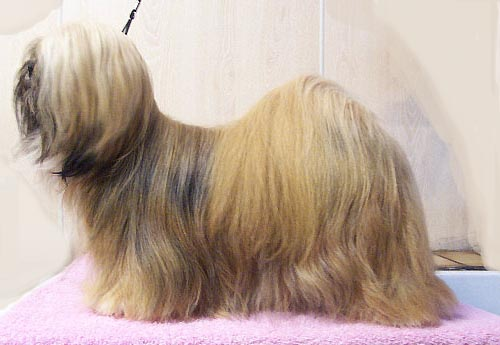
- Origin: Tibet
Traits
Height	Males	approximately 25 cm (10 in)
- Coat: long, hard
- Color: black, red, dark grizzle, golden, honey, parti-color, sandy, slate, smoke or white
Kennel club standards
- Fédération Cynologique Internationale: standard
- Notes: FCI patronage: United Kingdom

The Lhasa Apso (/ˈlɑːsə ˈæpsoʊ/ LAH-sə AP-soh) is a non-sporting dog breed originating in Tibet. Traditionally the breed has been used as an interior watchdog.

== Etymology ==
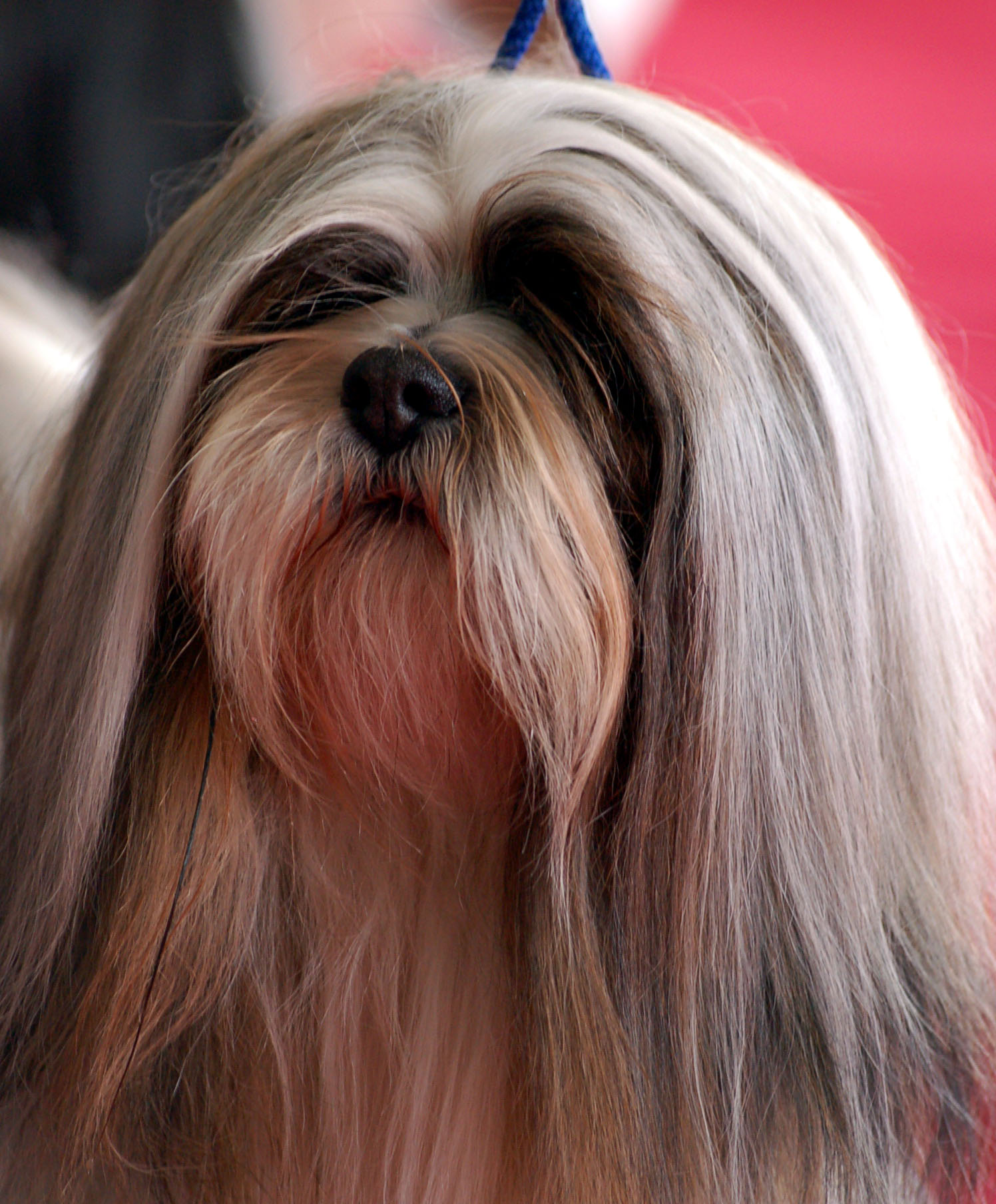
A Lhasa Apso head

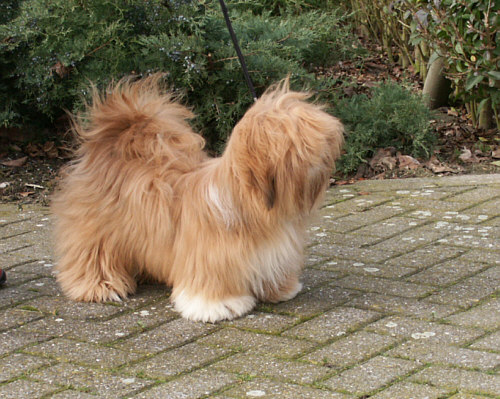
A young Lhasa Apso, not yet fully coated

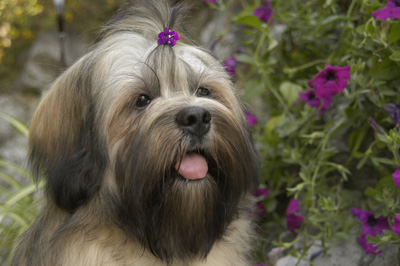
A young Lhasa Apso

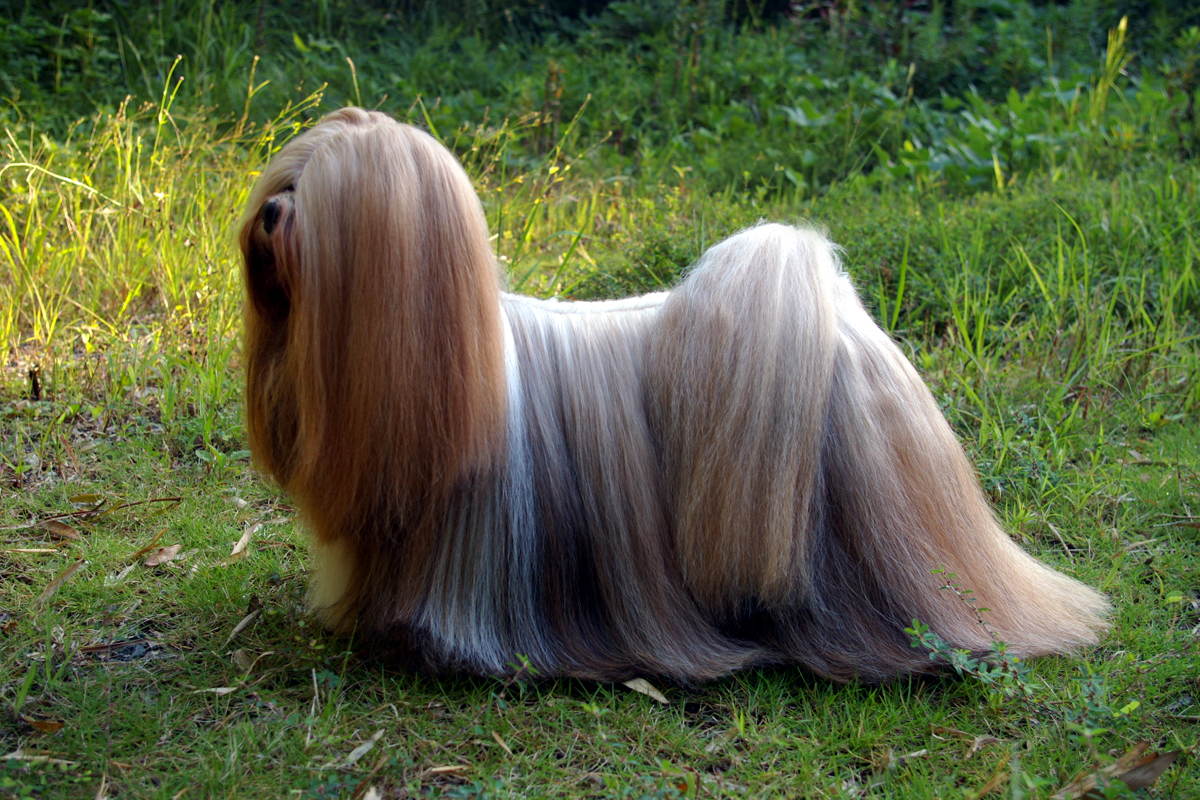
A Lhasa Apso with a long, dense coat

Lhasa is the capital city of Tibet, and apso is a word from the Tibetan language. There is some debate over the exact origin of the name; some say the word "apso" is an anglicized form of the Tibetan word for goatee ("ag-tshom", ཨག་ཚོམ་) or perhaps "ra-pho" (ར་ཕོ་) meaning "billy goat". It may also be a compound noun meaning "bark-guard" (lit. "ap" [ཨཔ], to bark, and "so" [སོ་], to guard).

== History ==
The Lhasa Apso is a thousand-year-old breed that historically served as sentinels at palaces and monasteries isolated high in the Himalayas of Tibet. In the early twentieth century some Tibetan dogs were brought to the United Kingdom by military men returning from the Indian subcontinent. These were of mixed types, similar to what would become either the Lhasa Apso or the Tibetan Terrier; at the time they were collectively known as "Lhasa Terriers".

The first American pair of Lhasas were a gift from Thubten Gyatso, 13th Dalai Lama to C. Suydam Cutting, arriving in the United States in 1933. Mr. Cutting had traveled to Tibet and met the Dalai Lama. At the time, there was only one Lhasa Apso registered in England. The American Kennel Club officially accepted the breed in 1935 in the Terrier Group, and in 1959 transferred the breed to the Non-Sporting Group. In the UK, they are placed in the Utility Group.

The breed was definitively accepted by the Fédération Cynologique Internationale in 1960.

== Characteristics ==
Dogs stand about 25 cm (9.8 in) at the withers, bitches slightly less. The coat may be black, red, dark grizzle, golden, honey, parti-colour, sandy, slate-coloured, smoke-coloured or white. It is thick and heavy, with a hard straight outer coat and a medium under-coat. The eyes are dark and the nose is black, and the ears are pendant. The tail is curved, sometimes with a kink at the tip, and should be carried over the back.

It is ranked in the 68th group (out of 79) in Stanley Coren's The Intelligence of Dogs, having fair working-obedience intelligence. The Lhasa Apso is a long-lived breed, with many living in good health into their early 20s.

== Health ==
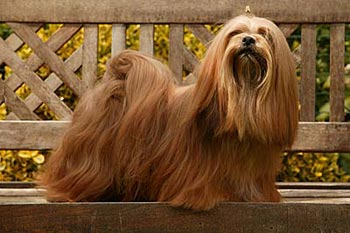
A red Lhasa Apso

A 2024 UK study found a life expectancy of 14 years for the breed compared to an average of 12.7 for purebreeds and 12 for crossbreeds.

The breed is predisposed to atopic dermatitis.
