= Animal welfare and rights in South Africa =

Treatment of and laws concerning non-human animals in South Africa

Animal welfare and rights in South Africa is about the treatment of and laws concerning non-human animals in South Africa.

== Legislation ==
The Animal Protection Act 1962 covers "domestic animals and birds, and wild animals, birds, and reptiles that are in captivity or under the control of humans."

The Act contains a detailed list of prohibited acts of cruelty including overloading, causing unnecessary suffering due to confinement, chaining or tethering, abandonment, unnecessarily denying food or water, keeping in a dirty or parasitic condition, or failing to provide veterinary assistance. There is also a general provision prohibiting wanton, unreasonable, or negligible commission or omission of acts resulting in unnecessary suffering. The Department of Agriculture, Forestry and Fisheries for 2013/14 to 2016/17 mentions updating animal protection legislation.

The anti-cruelty provisions of the Animal Protection Act 1962 apply to farmed animals. The Livestock Welfare Coordinating Committee (LWCC), managed by the South African Meat Industry Company, has the power to deal with production and game animal issues in farming. The NSPCA serves on the LWCC and ensures that animal welfare standards are being met and promoted.

In 2014, South Africa received a D out of possible grades A, B, C, D, E, F, G on World Animal Protection's Animal Protection Index.

== Animals used for food ==
According to Tatjana von Bormann, coordinator of the World Wide Fund for Nature/Conservation International GreenChoice Project, "Beef in South Africa is mostly produced in feedlots or factory farms". Pigs are also farmed intensively.

The number of cattle in South Africa increased by roughly 1 million in 1994 to around 14.1 million in 2010. Beef consumption increased by 20% between 2000 and 2009. From 2007-2015 chicken consumption increased by over 5% and pig consumption by 4% per year. According to a 2013 source, roughly 1 billion chickens are slaughtered each year in South Africa.

De-beaking, de-toeing, tail-docking, tooth pulling, castration, and dehorning of livestock without anaesthetic are illegal, as is confinement in gestation crates and battery cages. The NSPCA has given the pork industry until 1 January 2017 to phase out the use of gestation crates or else the organisation will prosecute the farmers and industry for contravening Section 2(1)(b) of the Animals Protection Act No 71 of 1962 for unnecessary confinement that causes suffering.

== Animals used in research ==
Animal experimentation, including testing cosmetics on animals, is legal in South Africa. South Africa does not keep statistics on the number of animals used in research. The NSPCA serves on various animal ethics committees to ensure that animals are not unnecessarily abused when used in research. No registered research is taking place in South Africa for cosmetic purposes.

== Animal organisations ==
Animal activist organizations in South Africa include:

- NSPCA (National Council of SPCAs), the oldest and largest animal organisation in South Africa that covers 93% of all animal cruelty investigations and prosecutions in the country. The NSPCA is a statutory body and therefore the custodians for animals in South Africa. The NSPCA is the only animal organisation in South Africa that concerns itself with all animals, no matter what species.
- Activists for Animals Africa (AAA), founded in 2011, whose stated aim is to bring about change for animals through advocacy, lobbying, boycotts, protests, and education programs. It has ongoing campaigns against rhinoceros poaching and lion breeding.
- Beauty Without Cruelty South Africa, which campaigns against animal cosmetics testing.
- The Animal Anti-Cruelty League, founded 1956, one of South Africa's major animal welfare organizations. They provide shelter for abandoned animals, run an adoption program, prosecute animal cruelty cases, and engage in humane education. They also run animal hospitals and has also been involved with monitoring the use of animals in the filming industry.
- African Vegan Outreach, a Beauty Without Cruelty affiliate, which focuses on educating people about veganism.
- Animal Voice South Africa, which has campaigns against gestation crates, battery cages, dog fighting, runs humane education programs, and is the official representative of Compassion in World Farming in South Africa.
- Animal Law Reform South Africa, the first dedicated animal law organisation in South Africa, aimed at improving animal protection through the legal system.
- Ban Animal Trading South Africa, an animal rights organization that exists to facilitate positive and meaningful change aimed at ending animal exploitation.
- RabbitCare South Africa (RCSA), an animal-welfare educational organization that works against the abuse of rabbits through educational programmes.
- Catzrus is a registered rescuing, fostering, rehabilitating and rehoming organization. They deal mostly with dumped, abused and neglected cats and kittens that come into their care. They are 100% foster-based.

These cats are often desperate for attention and they believe that it is their duty to do everything that they can to give them a second chance.

Their philosophy centers around responsible pet guardianship, and so all their cats and kittens are therefore re-homed through an affordable, all-inclusive adoption package.

They use the registered awareness initiative, "Be Wise Sterilise", to drive our philosophy. By focusing on the root of the problem, lack of sterilization, they believe that they can significantly reduce the number of homeless animals, overcrowded shelters and the unnecessary suffering of victims of irresponsible pet guardians.

== See also ==
- Animal welfare organisations based in South Africa
- Wildlife sanctuaries of South Africa
- Animal rights movement
- Timeline of animal welfare and rights
- Animal consciousness
- National Council of SPCAs - NSPCA
