= Gull Terrier =

Dog breed

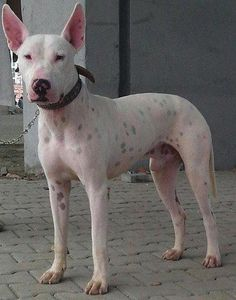
- Images of Gull Terrier
- Other names: Indian Bull Terrier; Pakistani Bull Terrier; Gull Terr; Gull Terr
- Origin: India; Pakistan
Traits
Height	Males	18–22 in (46–56 cm)
	Females	18–22 in (46–56 cm)
Weight	Males	55–65 lb (25–29 kg)
	Females	45–55 lb (20–25 kg)
- Coat: Short, dense
- Color: White

The Gull Terrier (also known as the Gull Terr) (Note: This breed is known by several names, including the South Asian Gull Terrier, South Asian Gull Terr, Indian Bull Terrier, Indo-Pakistani Bull Terrier, and Bull Terr.) is a rare breed of dog that originates from the Punjab region of Pakistan and India; it is believed to be several hundred years old. They are often used in dog fighting, hunting, and guarding. The Gull Terrier is a direct descendant of the Bull Terrier breed that came from Great Britain. These English dog breeds, along with those indigenous to the Indian subcontinent such as the Bully Kutta, played a major role in the Gull Terrier's breeding development and are considered to be a direct ancestor of the modern Gull Terrier. Old photographs of the English Bull terrier delineate many of the same features such as height pointy ears and a long muzzle of the Gull Terrier.

== Description ==
A Gull Terrier is a tall, broad-chested, medium-sized muscular dog that is mostly found in Pakistan and India. Gull Terriers have large erect ears. Their coats are normally white, although sometimes they have dark-colored markings on their faces and bodies.

Gull Terriers are wary of strangers. They are protective of their owners and territory. They are highly trainable.

== Origin ==
During the era of the British Raj in India, Bull Terriers were introduced to the northwestern Indian subcontinent, which now includes the modern republics of India and Pakistan. In colonial India, the Bull Terrier breed soared in popularity, with the Bull Terrier Club of India being established in Calcutta. Bull Terriers were crossed with local breeds to develop the Gull Terrier, often called the Indian Bull Terrier. The Gull Terrier is a medium-sized dog with short, smooth fur which resembles that of the Staffordshire Bull Terrier. These dogs were originally used in blood sports such as bull baiting, and dog fighting - a bloody entertainment introduced by the British to the Indian subcontinent. When the blood sport was made illegal across the Empire, the Gull Terriers were used as guard dogs. (Note: Dating back to the British Indian Prevention of Cruelty to Animals Act, 1890, dog fighting is illegal and violations of animal rights in Pakistan. "Unfortunately, funds to deal with animal rights in the department have dried up. Hence, the law that should prevent dog fights, camel fights, bear-baiting, and the like is violated all over Pakistan." The Prevention of Cruelty to Animals Act (1960) in India "bars inciting or baiting animals into fighting. Receiving money or allowing any place to be used for such fights too is illegal.") In colonial India, some breeders crossed the Gull Terrier with the Bully Kutta, naming the progeny the "Gull Dong", which "is celebrated in India and Pakistan for its speed and tenacity".

== Ban ==
Under the New York City Housing Authority, Gull Terriers, alongside Gull Dongs, are banned in homes. The dog is also banned in the Cayman Islands.

== See also ==
- List of dog breeds
- List of dog breeds from India
