= Dog fighting =

Blood sport

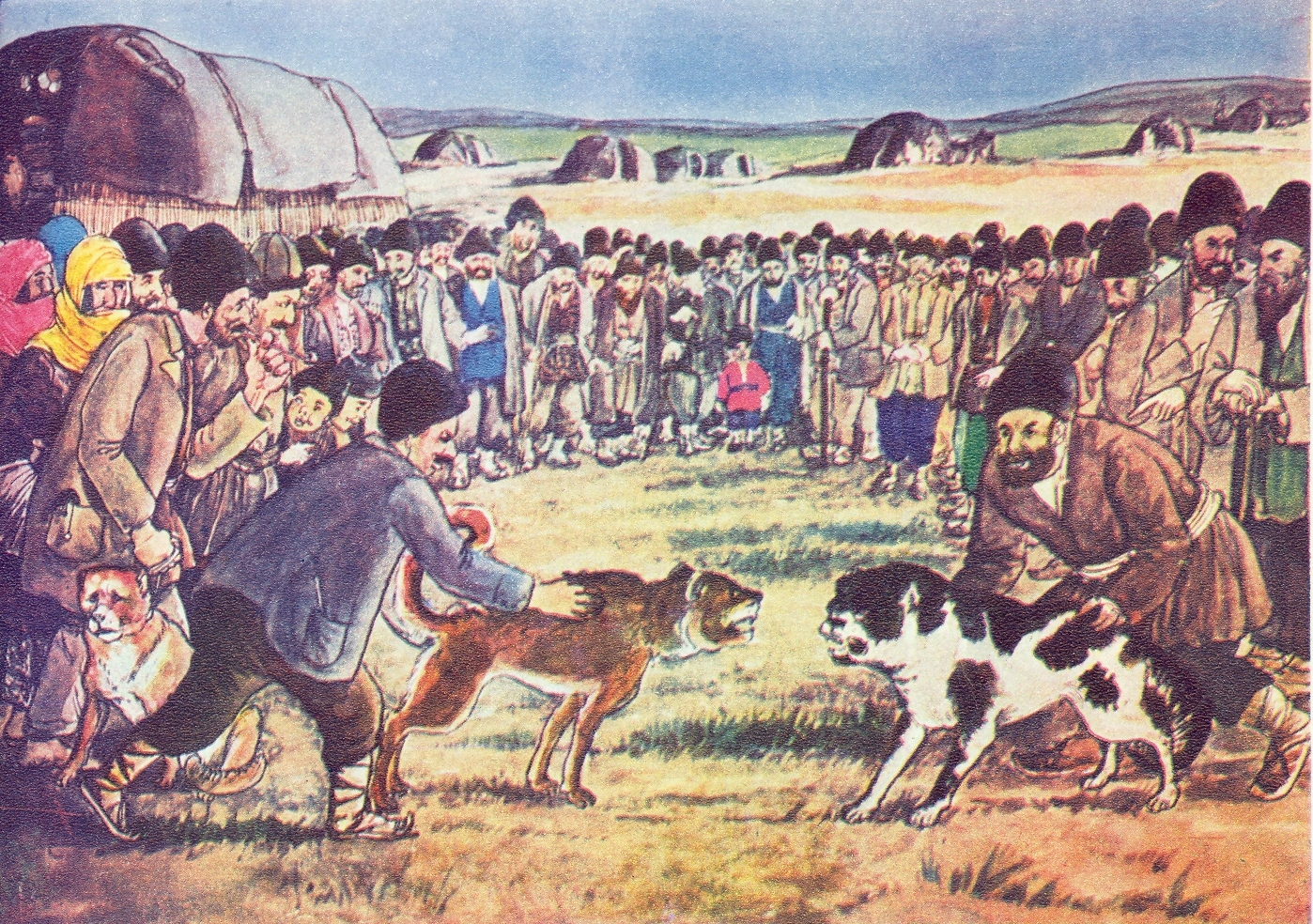
Dog baiting by Azim Azimzade, 1938

Dog fighting is a type of blood sport that turns game and fighting dogs against each other in a physical fight, often to the death, for the purposes of gambling or entertainment to the spectators. In rural areas, fights are often staged in barns or outdoor pits; in urban areas, fights are often staged in garages, basements, warehouses, alleyways, abandoned buildings, neighborhood playgrounds, or in the streets. Dog fights usually last until one dog is declared a winner, which occurs when one dog fails to scratch, dies, or jumps out of the pit. Sometimes dog fights end without declaring a winner; for instance, the dog's owner may call off the fight.

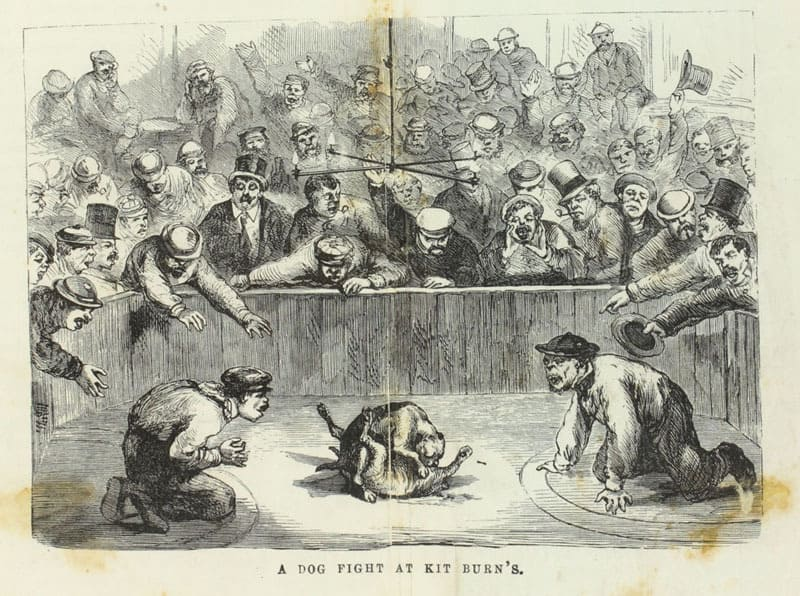
"A Dog Fight at Kit Burn's" by Edward Winslow Martin (James D. McCabe). USA, 1868

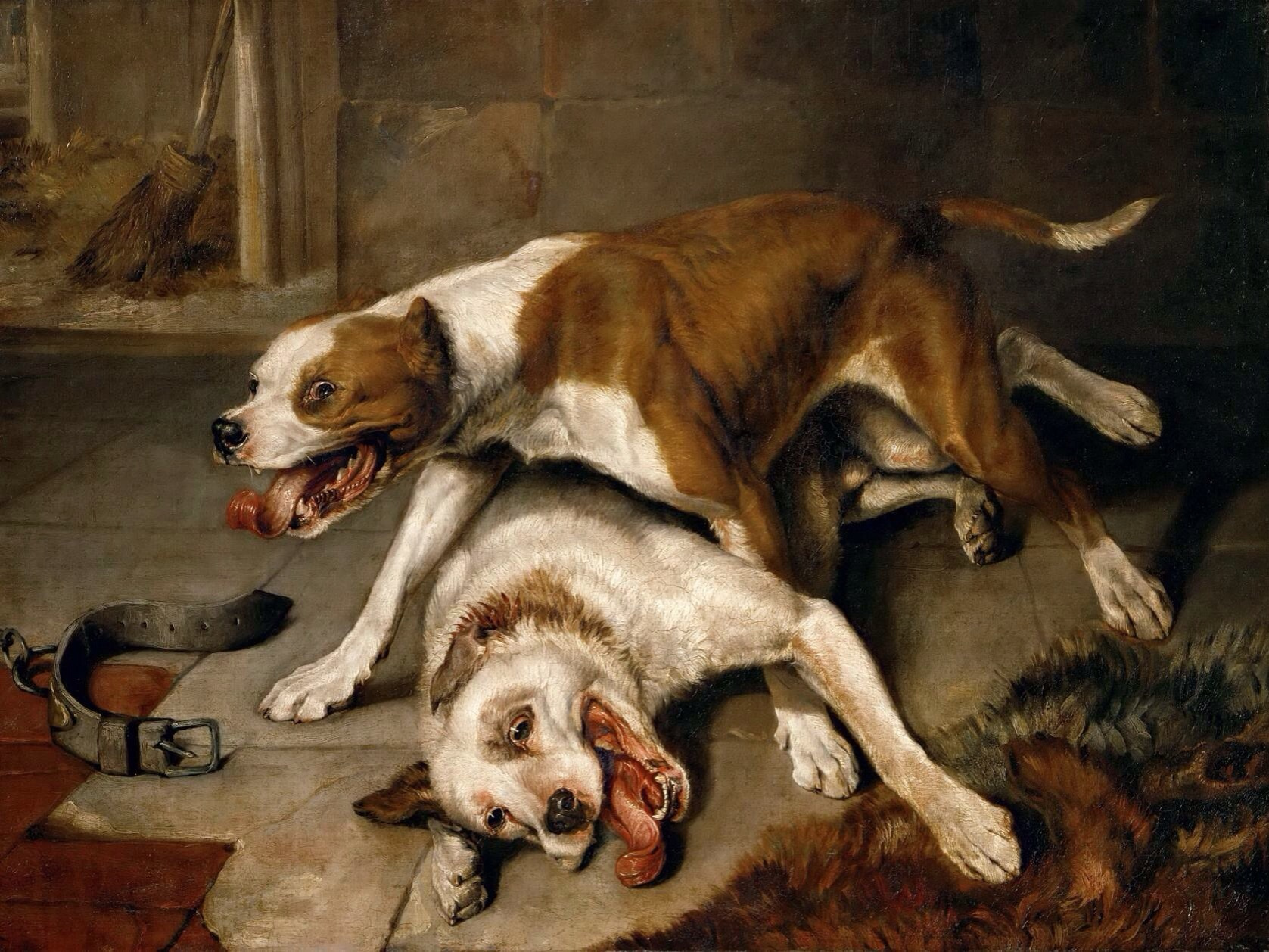
"Fighting dogs getting wind" by Sir Edwin Henry Landseer, 1818

Dog fighting generates revenue from stud fees, admission fees, and gambling. Most countries have banned dog fighting, but it is still legal in some countries, such as Venezuela, Bangladesh, Japan and Albania.

== History ==
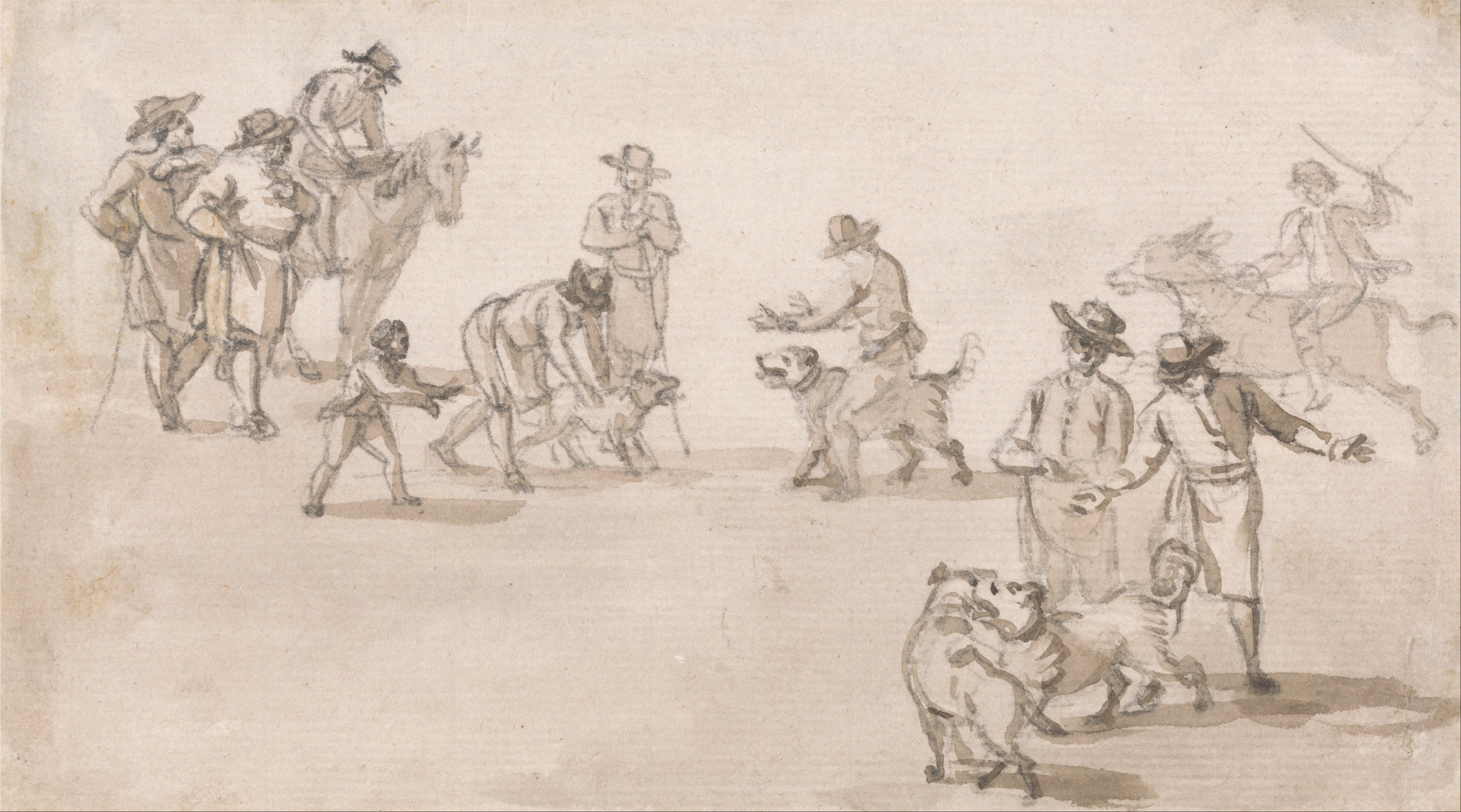
A dogfight, by Paul Sandby, c. 1785

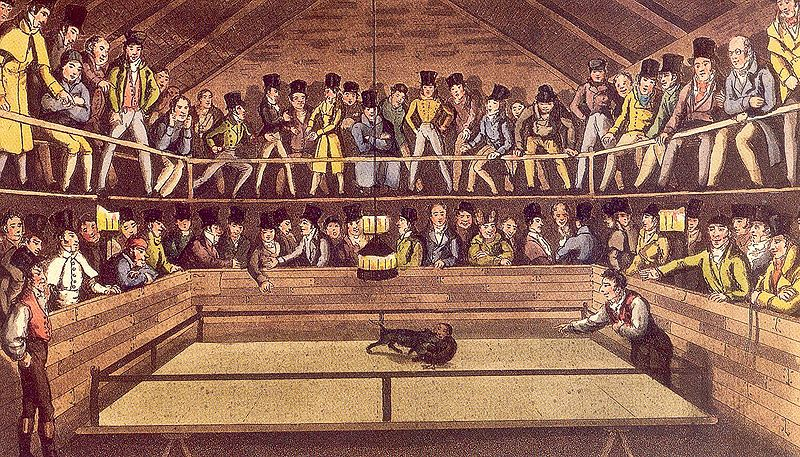
A fight between a dog and Jacco Macacco, the fighting monkey, at the Westminster Pit, London. 1822

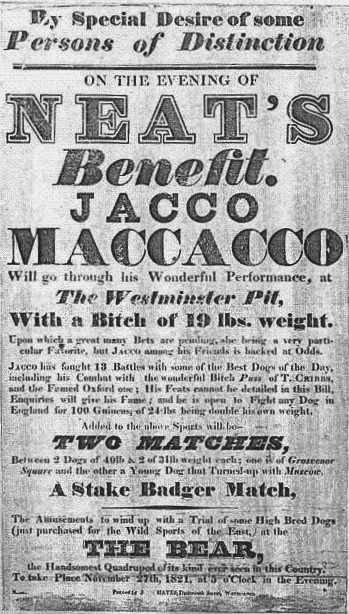
An English broadside advertising an upcoming event at the Westminster Pit, London, featuring a match between the monkey, Jacco Macacco and a dog, also dog fights, badger-baiting and bear-baiting, c. November 1821

=== Europe ===
Blood sports in general can be traced back to the Roman Empire. In 13 BC, for instance, the ancient Roman circus slew 600 African beasts. Dog fighting, more specifically, can also be traced to ancient Roman times. In AD 43, for example, dogs fought alongside the Romans and the British in the Roman Conquest of Britain. In this war, the Romans used a breed that originated from Greece called the Molossus; the Britons used broad-mouthed Mastiffs, which were thought to descend from the Molossus bloodline and which also originated from Greece. Though they lost this war, the Romans were so impressed with the Britons' warhounds that they began to import these dogs for use in the Colosseum, as well as for use in times of war. While spectators watched, the imported dogs were pitted against animals such as elephants, lions, bears and bulls, and also against gladiators.

Later, the Romans bred and exported fighting dogs to Spain, France and other parts of Europe until eventually these dogs made their way back to England. Though bull-baiting and bear-baiting were popular throughout the Middle Ages up to the 19th century in Germany, France, Spain, Portugal, and the Netherlands, the British pitted dogs against bulls and bears. In 12th century England during the feudal era, the landed aristocracy, who held direct military control in decentralized feudal systems and thus owned the animals necessary for waging war, introduced bull baiting and bear baiting to the rest of the British population. In later years, bull-baiting and bear-baiting became a popular source of entertainment for the British royalty. For instance, Queen Elizabeth I, who reigned from 1558 to 1603, was an avid follower of bull- and bear-baiting; she bred Mastiffs for baiting and would entertain foreign guests with a fight whenever they visited England. In addition to breeding Mastiffs and entertaining foreign guests with a fight, Queen Elizabeth, and later her successor, King James I, built a number of bear gardens in London. The garden buildings were round and roofless, and housed not only bears, but also bulls and other wild animals that could be used in a fight. Today, a person can visit the Bear Garden Museum near the Shakespeare Global Complex in Bankside, Southwark.

With the popularity of bull- and bear-baiting, bears needed for such fights soon became scarce. With the scarcity of the bear population, the price of bears rose and, because of this, bull-baiting became more common in England over time. Bulls who survived the fights were slaughtered afterwards for their meat, as it was believed that the fight caused bull meat to become more tender. In fact, if a bull was offered for sale in the market without having been baited the previous day, butchers were liable to face substantial fines. Animal fights were temporarily suspended in England when Oliver Cromwell seized power, but were reinstated again after the Restoration. Dog fighting, bull-baiting, and bear-baiting were officially outlawed in England by the Cruelty to Animals Act 1835. The official ban on all fights, however, actually served to promote dog fighting in England. Since a small amount of space was required for the pit where a dog fight took place, as compared to the ring needed for bull- or bear-baiting, authorities had a difficult time enforcing the ban on dog fighting.

=== United States ===
In 1817, the bull and terrier crossbreeds were brought to America and dog fighting slowly became part of American culture. Yet, though historical accounts of dog fighting in America can be dated back to the 1750s, it was not until the end of the Civil War (1861–1865) that widespread interest and participation in the blood sport began in the United States. For instance, in 1881, the Mississippi and Ohio railroads advertised special fares to a dog fight in Louisville; public forums such as Kit Burns' Tavern, "The Sportman's Hall", in Manhattan regularly hosted matches. Many of these dogs thrown into the "professional pits" that flourished during the 1860s came from England and Ireland — where citizens had turned to dogs when bull-baiting and bear-baiting became illegal in their countries.

In 20th century America, despite the expansion of laws to outlaw dog fighting, dog fighting continued to flourish underground. Aiding in the expansion of dog fighting were the police and firemen, who saw dog fighting as a form of entertainment amongst their ranks. In fact, the Police Gazette served as a go-to source for information about where one could attend a fight. When Henry Bergh, who started the American Society for the Prevention of Cruelty to Animals (ASPCA), witnessed police involvement in these fights, he was motivated to seek and receive authority for the ASPCA Humane Law Enforcement Agents to have arresting power in New York. Additionally, Bergh's 1867 revision to New York's animal cruelty law made all forms of animal fighting illegal. However, according to the ASPCA website, the Humane Law Enforcement department of ASPCA has been disbanded and NYPD has taken over its duty. As laws were passed to outlaw the activity, high-profile organizations, such as the United Kennel Club, who once endorsed the sport by formulating rules and sanctioning referees, withdrew their endorsement.

On July 8, 2009, one of the largest dog fighting raids in U.S. history occurred. Law enforcement seized over 350 dogs, mostly pit bulls, and arrested 26 people across eight states. Most of the dogs were expected to have to be euthanized, as their harsh upbringing did not prepare them to be able to be safely placed in an adoptive home.

== Breed origins ==
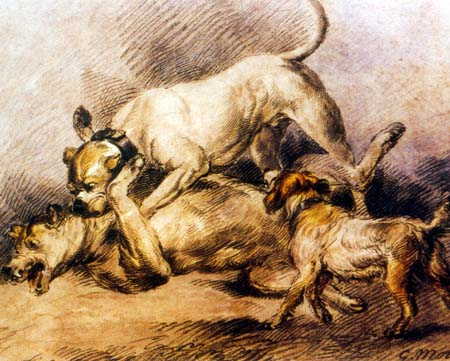
Fighting Dogs by George Morland, circa 1800

According to one scholar, Richard Strebel, the foundation for modern fighting dogs came from five dog types: the Tibetan Mastiff, the English Mastiff (out of which came the Dogue de Bordeaux, the Bulldog, and the Pug), the Great Dane (out of which came the Broholmer and the Boxer), the Newfoundland, and the Saint Bernard (out of which came the Leonberger). However, Dieter Fleig disagreed with Strebel and offered the following list as composing the foundation of modern fighting dogs: the Tibetan Mastiff, the Molossus, the Bullenbeisser, the Great Dane, the English Mastiff, the Bulldog, the bull and terrier, and the Chincha Bulldog. Other early dog types used for fighting included the Blue Paul Terrier, the Córdoba Fighting Dog, and the Dogo Cubano.

The foundation breed of the fighting dog was, in its outward appearance, a large, low, heavy breed with a powerful build, strongly developed head, and tremendously threatening voice. Additionally, these foundation breeds were also bred for a powerful jaw that would enable them to defend and protect humans, to overpower and pull down large animals on a hunt, and to control large, unmanageable domestic animals. These dogs were also sometimes equipped with metal plates, chains, and collars with sharp spikes or hooked knives in order to be used in wars throughout history.

When bull-baiting became popular in England due to the shortage of bears, bull-baiters soon realized that large fighting dogs were built too heavy and too slow for this type of combat. When fighting a bull, dogs were trained to grab onto the bull's nose and pin the bull's head to the ground. If the dog failed to do this, the bull would fling the dog out of the ring with its horns. The British therefore decided to selectively breed fighting dogs for shorter legs and a more powerful jaw. These efforts resulted in the Old English Bulldog.

However, when countries started outlawing bull- and bear-baiting, dog fighters started pitting dogs against other dogs. With the prevalence of such combat, dog fighters soon realized Bulldogs were inadequate and began to breed Bulldogs with terriers for more desired characteristics. Terriers were most likely crossbred with Bulldogs due to their "generally rugged body structure", speed, aggression, and "highly developed gameness". Yet, there is a debate over which type of terrier was bred with Bulldogs in order to create the bull and terrier. For instance, Joseph L. Colby claimed that it was the old English White Terrier that the bull and terrier is descended from, while Rhonda D. Evans and Craig J. Forsyth contend that its ancestor is the Rat Terrier. Carl Semencic, on the other hand, held that a variety of terriers produced the bull and terrier.

Eventually, out of crossbreeding Bulldogs and terriers, the English created the Staffordshire Bull Terrier. When the Staffordshire Bull Terrier came to America in 1817, Americans began to selectively breed for gameness and created the American Pit Bull Terrier (originally known as the Pit Bull Terrier), which is a unique breed due to its absence of threat displays when fighting. Bull Terriers, Staffordshire Bull Terriers, American Pit Bull Terriers, and American Staffordshire Terriers, are all breeds that are commonly labeled as "pit bulls". The fact that pit bulls were historically bred to fight dogs, bulls, and bears has been used as one of the justifications in some US cities to implement breed-specific legislation. Other breeds in which dogs at various stages of the breed history have sometimes been used as fighters include the Akita Inu, the Boston Terrier, the Bully Kutta, the Ca de Bou, the Dogo Argentino, the Gull Dong, the Gull Terrier, the Neapolitan Mastiff, the Presa Canario, the Spanish Mastiff, and the Tosa.

== Societal aspects ==
After interviewing 31 dogmen and attending 14 dog fights in the Southern United States, Evans, Gauthier, and Forsyth theorized on what attracts men to dog fights. In their study, Evans, et al., discussed dog fighting's attractiveness in terms of masculinity and class immobility. In the United States, masculinity embodies the qualities of strength, aggression, competition, and striving for success. By embodying these characteristics, a man can gain honor and status in his society. Yet, working class occupations, unlike middle or upper class occupations, provide limited opportunities to validate this culturally accepted definition of masculinity. So, working class men look for alternative ways to validate their masculinity and obtain honor and status. One way to do this is through dog fighting. This is supported by the Evans, et al. findings: the majority of committed dogmen were mostly drawn from the working class, while the middle and upper classes were barely represented. Men from middle and upper classes have opportunities to express their masculinity through their occupations; dog fighting, therefore, is just a hobby for them while it plays a central role in the lives of working class men.

Aside from enjoyment of the sport and status, people are also drawn to dog fighting for money. In fact, the average dog fight could easily net more money than an armed robbery or a series of isolated drug transactions.

=== Bait animals ===
"Bait" animals are animals used to test a dog's fighting instinct; they are often mauled or killed in the process. Many of the training methods involve torturing and killing of other animals. Often "bait" animals are stolen pets such as puppies, kittens, rabbits, small dogs and even stock (pit bulls acquired by the dog fighting ring which appear to be passive or less dominant). Other sources for bait animals include wild or feral animals, animals obtained from a shelter or animals obtained from "free to good home" ads. The snouts of bait animals are often wrapped with duct tape to prevent them from fighting back and they are used in training sessions to improve a dog's endurance, strength or fighting ability. A bait animal's teeth may also be broken to prevent them from fighting back. If the bait animals are still alive after the training sessions, they are usually given to the dogs as a reward and the dogs finish killing them.

=== Types of dog fighters ===
==== Street fighters ====
Often associated with gang activity, street fighters fight dogs over insults, turf invasions, or simple taunts like "my dog can kill your dog". These types of fights are often spontaneous; unorganized; conducted for money, drugs, or bragging rights; and occur on street corners, back alleys, and neighborhood playgrounds. Urban street fighters generally have several dogs chained in backyards, often behind privacy fences, or in basements or garages. After a street fight, the dogs are often discovered by police and animal control officers either dead or dying. Due to the spontaneity and secrecy of a street fight, they are very difficult to respond to unless reported immediately.

Hobbyists and professionals often decry the techniques that street fighters use to train their dogs. Such techniques include starving, drugging, and physically abusing the dog.

==== Hobbyists ====
Hobbyists fight dogs for supplemental income and entertainment purposes. They typically have one or more dogs participating in several organized fights and operate primarily within a specific geographic network. Hobbyists are also acquainted with one another and tend to return to predetermined fight venues repeatedly.

==== Professionals ====
Professional fighters breed generations of skilled "game dogs" and take great pride in their dogs' lineage. These fighters make a tremendous amount of money charging stud fees to breed their champions, in addition to the fees and winnings they collect for fighting them. They also tend to own a large number of dogs — sometimes 50 or more. Professionals also use trade journals, such as Your Friend and Mine, Game Dog Times, The American Warrior, and The Pit Bull Chronicle, to discuss recent fights and to advertise the sale of training equipment and puppies. Some fighters operate on a national or even international level within highly secret networks. When a dog is not successful in a fight, a professional may dispose of it using a variety of techniques such as drowning, strangulation, hanging, gun shot, electrocution or some other method. Sometimes professionals and hobbyists dispose of dogs deemed aggressive to humans to street fighters.

=== Gang and criminal activities ===
Dog fighting is a felony in all 50 states of the United States of America, the District of Columbia, Puerto Rico, and the U.S. Virgin Islands. While dog fighting statutes exist independently of general anti-cruelty statutes and carry stiffer penalties than general state anti-cruelty statutes, a person can be charged under both or can be charged under one, but not the other — depending on the evidence. In addition to felony charges for dog fighting, 48 states and the District of Columbia have provisions within their dog fighting statutes that explicitly prohibit attendance as a spectator at a dog fighting exhibition. Since Montana and Hawaii do not have such provisions, a person can pay an entrance fee to watch a dog fight in either state and not be convicted under these statutes. Additionally, 46 states and the District of Columbia make possessing, owning, or keeping a fighting dog a felony.

While dog fighting was previously seen as an isolated animal welfare issue, and therefore rarely enforced, the last decade has produced a growing body of legal and empirical evidence that has revealed a connection between dog fighting and other crimes within a community, such as organized crime, racketeering, drug distribution, and/or gangs. Within the gang community, fighting dogs compete with firearms as the weapon of choice; indeed, their versatile utility arguably surpasses that of a loaded firearm in the criminal underground. Drug dealers distribute their illicit merchandise, wagers are made, weapons are concealed, and the dogs mutilate each other in a bloody frenzy as crowds cheer them on. Violence often erupts among the usually armed gamblers when debts are to be collected and paid. There is also a concern for children who are routinely exposed to dog fighting and are forced to accept the inherent violence as normal. The routine exposure of children to unfettered animal abuse and neglect is a major contributing factor in their later manifestation of social deviance.

=== Animal welfare and rights ===
Animal advocates consider dog fighting to be one of the most serious forms of animal abuse, not only for the violence that the dogs endure during and after the fights, but because of the suffering they often endure in training, which ultimately can lead to death.

According to a filing in U.S. District Court in Richmond by federal investigators in Virginia, which was obtained under the Freedom of Information Act and published by The Baltimore Sun on July 6, 2007, a losing dog or one whose potential is considered unacceptable faces "being put to death by drowning, strangulation, hanging, gun shot, electrocution or some other method". Some of the training of fighting dogs may entail the use of small animals (including kittens) as prey for the dogs.

== Legal status ==
Laws regarding dog fighting (breeding, organising and attending) around the world: Nationwide ban Some subnational bans No bans No data

Dog fighting has been popular in many countries throughout history and continues to be practiced both legally and illegally around the world. In the 20th and 21st centuries, dog fighting has increasingly become an unlawful activity in most jurisdictions of the world, despite the fact that in cultural practice it may be common.

Dog fighting is illegal throughout the entire European Union and most of South America. The American Pit Bull Terrier is by far the most common breed involved in the blood sport. The Dogo Cubano and Córdoba Fighting Dog were used for fighting a century ago, but both of these breeds have become extinct.

=== Afghanistan ===
Previously banned by the Taliban during their rule, dog fighting made, circa 2012, a resurgence throughout Afghanistan as a common winter weekend pastime, especially in Kabul, where the fights are public and often policed to maintain safety to the spectators. Dogs, in some cases, fight to the death but in most cases, to submission.

=== Albania ===
Dog fighting is legal in Albania in professional fights.

=== Argentina ===
Article 3.8 of Law 14.346 on the Ill-Treatment and Acts of Cruelty to Animals of 1954 explicitly prohibits 'carrying out public or private acts of animal fights, fights of bulls and heifers, or parodies [thereof], in which animals are killed, wounded or harassed.'

=== Australia ===
Dog fighting and the possession of any fighting equipment designed for dog fighting is illegal in all Australian states and territories. The illegal nature of dog fighting in Australia means that injured dogs rarely get veterinary treatment, placing the dog's health and welfare at even greater risk. "Restricted Breed Dogs" cannot be imported into Australia. These include the Dogo Argentino, the Tosa, the Fila Brasileiro, the Perro de Presa Canario and the American Pit Bull Terrier. Of these, the American Pit Bull Terrier and the Perro de Presa Canario are the only breeds currently known to exist in Australia and there are strict regulations on keeping these breeds, including a prohibition on transferring ownership.

=== Bolivia ===
Bolivia passed a law in 2003 or 2004 criminalising dog fighting.

=== Brazil ===
In Brazil, Federal Decree 24.645 promulgated in 1934 by president Getúlio Vargas specifically prohibited 'to cause an animal to fight with another'. Additionally, article 32 of the Federal Environmental Crimes Law (9.605 of 12 February 1998) prohibits abuse and cruelty against animals under the penalty of imprisonment from three months to one year, and a fine.

=== Canada ===
Dog fighting has been illegal in Canada since 1892; however, the current law requires police to catch individuals during the unlawful act, which is often difficult.

=== China ===
Dog fighting is allowed under Chinese law, although gambling remains illegal.

=== Costa Rica ===
In Costa Rica, dog fights were illegal for decades as a misdemeanor; since 2014 and after a legal reform, they became a felony and are punished with up to three years of imprisonment.

=== India ===
Dog fighting is prevalent in some parts of India, particularly in the state of Haryana. The practice is illegal under the Prevention of Cruelty to Animals Act, 1960.

=== Japan ===
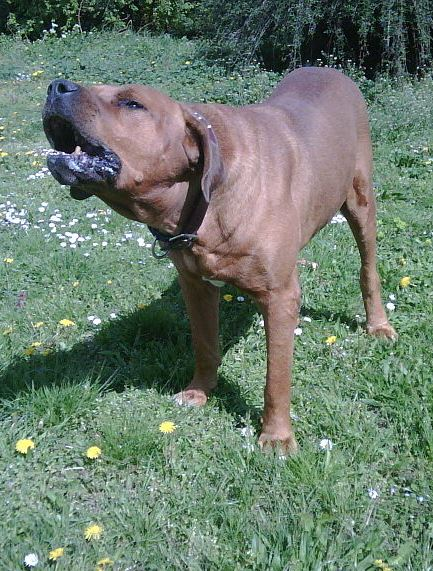
Japanese fighting dog Tosa Inu

According to historical documents, Hōjō Takatoki, the 14th shikken (shōgun's regent) of the Kamakura shogunate was known to be obsessed with dog fighting, to the point where he allowed his samurai to pay taxes with dogs. During this period, dog fighting was known as inuawase (犬合わせ).

Dog fighting was considered a way for the samurai to retain their aggressive edge during peaceful times. Several daimyōs (feudal lords), such as Chōsokabe Motochika and Yamauchi Yōdō, both from Tosa Province (present-day Kōchi Prefecture), were known to encourage dog fighting. Dog fighting was also popular in Akita Prefecture, which is the origin of the Akita breed.

Dog fighting evolved in Kōchi to a form that is called tōken (闘犬). Under modern rules, dogs fight in a fenced ring until one of the dogs barks, yelps, or loses the will to fight. Owners are allowed to admit defeat, and matches are stopped if a doctor judges that it is too dangerous. Draws usually occur when both dogs will not fight or both dogs fight until the time limit. There are various other rules, including one that specifies that a dog will lose if it attempts to copulate. Champion dogs are called yokozuna, as in sumo. Dog fighting is not banned at a nationwide level, but the prefectures of Tokyo, Kanagawa, Fukui, Ishikawa, Toyama and Hokkaidō all ban the practice. Currently, most fighting dogs in Japan are of the Tosa breed, which is native to Kōchi.

=== The European Union ===
Dog fighting is illegal throughout the European Union.

==== Bulgaria ====
In 2019, an investigation by Hidden-in-Sight for the League Against Cruel Sports and the BBC highlighted a global trade in fighting dogs centered in Bulgaria. Subsequently, in April, a raid took place where 58 people were arrested at the site of two fighting pits.

==== Greece ====
In October 2018, Vice.Gr released an exposé into dog fighting in Greece and the Balkans. This covered how dog fighting is linked to serious organised group in the country. The piece was advised by Hidden-in-Sight.

==== Ireland ====
Dog fighting has been illegal in Ireland for over 150 years, although the sport is still popular in underground circles.

=== Guatemala ===
Article 62 §h of decree no. 5-2017 – Animal Protection and Welfare Act of Guatemala, enacted in April 2017, explicitly prohibits the promotion of, participation in and organisation of shows that include fighting between dogs.

=== Honduras ===
Dog fighting had previously been popular for decades amongst the poorest people of Honduras. The most common dog of choice for trainers was the American Pit Bull Terrier. Matches were held in the shanty towns of Tegucigalpa, with fights taking place in a simple sand pit surrounded by bleachers, often with only a few dozen spectators. Dog Fighting was more of a spectating pastime for those living in poverty than a form of gambling for locals.

On November 12, 2015, the Honduran National Congress approved the Animal Welfare Act which banned the use and ownership of fighting dogs. Anyone found subjecting a dog to, assisting in the management or organization of any form of dog fight training, matches or breeding programs can be imprisoned for 3–6 years.

=== Kuwait ===
Dog fighting became illegal in Kuwait as well as animal abuse as is stated "The law stipulates penalties of up to one year imprisonment and a fine of KD 1,000 for anyone who abuses, neglects or offers animals for sale ".

=== Mexico ===
Dog fighting became illegal in Mexico on June 24, 2017.

=== New Zealand ===
In accordance with the Animal Welfare Act 1999, dog fighting is illegal within New Zealand. Breeding, training or owning dogs for fighting is also illegal.

=== Pakistan ===
Even though it has recently been banned by law, it is still being practiced in rural Pakistan, especially in provinces such as Punjab, Azad Kashmir, Sindh and Khyber Pakhtunkhwa. Karachi is the most popular city about pit bull fighting with the proper rules. There can be as much as millions of rupees at stake for the owners of winning dogs, so different breeds have carefully been bred and selected specifically for the purpose, such as the Bully Kutta.

=== Panama ===
Law 308 on the Protection of Animals was approved by the National Assembly of Panama on 15 March 2012. Article 7 of the law states: 'Dog fights, animal races, bullfights – whether of the Spanish or Portuguese style – the breeding, entry, permanence and operation in the national territory of all kinds of circus or circus show that uses trained animals of any species, are prohibited.' Horse racing and cockfighting were exempt from the ban.

=== Paraguay ===
Organizing fights between all animals, both in public and private, is prohibited in Paraguay under Law No. 4840 on Animal Protection and Welfare, promulgated on 28 January 2013. Specifically:

- 'The use of animals in shows, fights, popular festivals and other activities that imply cruelty or mistreatment, that can cause death, suffering or make them the object of unnatural and unworthy treatments' is prohibited (Article 30).
- 'Training domestic animals to carry out provoked fights, with the goal of holding a public or private show' is considered an 'act of mistreatment'. (Article 31)
- 'The use of animals in shows, fights, popular festivals, and other activities that imply cruelty or mistreatment, which may cause death, suffering or make them subject to unnatural or humiliating treatment' is considered a 'very serious infraction' (Article 32), which are punishable by between 501 and 1500 minimum daily wages (jornales mínimos, Article 39), and the perpetrator may be barred from 'acquiring or possessing other animals for a period that may be up to 10 years' (Article 38).

=== Philippines ===
Dog fighting is illegal in the Philippines under the Animal Welfare Act of 1998, with those involved being convicted under animal cruelty laws.

=== Russia ===
As of 1999, dog fighting is popular in Russia. Although animal cruelty laws exist in Russia, dog fighting is widely practiced according to a 2007 report by The New York Times. Laws prohibiting dog fights have been passed in certain places like Moscow by order of that city's mayor. In much of Russia, dog fights are legally held, generally using Caucasian Shepherd Dogs, Georgian shepherds and Central Asian Shepherd Dogs. Temperament tests, which are a common and relatively mild form of dog fighting used for breeding purposes, are fairly commonplace. Most dog fights are traditional contests used to test the stamina and ability of working dogs used to protect livestock. Unlike fights with pit bulls and other fighting breeds, a veterinarian is always on hand, the contests are never to the death, and serious injuries are very rare. Most fights are over in minutes when it is clear which dog is superior. At the end of three rounds, the contest is declared a draw.

In 2018, the Russian government passed legislation on the responsible treatment of animals, which strengthened laws against dog fighting. Although the practice was prohibited and made punishable by law, it continued to take place as of 2021. Kirill Goryachev of the Moscow Society for the Protection of Animals stated to news channel "360" that the police's enforcement of the law was ineffective. He said that there was no specialized unit to tackle dog fighting in the way that the police have specific agencies to tackle illegal gambling rings.

=== South Africa ===
Dog fighting has been declared illegal in the Republic of South Africa. However, it is still very popular in the underground world, with dog fighting being a highly syndicated and organized crime. The NSPCA (National Council of SPCAs) is the largest animal welfare organization in Africa, and has been the organization that has conducted the most raids and busts, of which the most recent was in 2013, where 18 people were arrested, and 14 dogs were involved. Dog fighting is practiced throughout the country, in the townships area where gangs and drugs are mostly associated with dog fighting.

Dog fighting has been well documented in South Africa, particularly in the Western Cape region of Stellenbosch. The Stellenbosch Animal Welfare Society (AWS) frequently responds to complaints of nighttime dog fighting in the town of Cloetesville, in which hundreds of dogs fight. Young children may be used to transport fighting dogs to avoid the arrest of the owners.

==== Tsakane dog fighting case ====
In November 2013, the NSPCA arrested 18 suspects who were caught in the act of illegal dog fighting in Tsakane in the East Rand. The suspects were arrested and charged for illegal dog fighting. Dog fighting is a criminal and prosecutable offence in South Africa. 14 pit bull-type dogs were confiscated from the property and were used for fighting purposes. Some of the dogs were badly injured as a result of the fighting and had to be humanely euthanized. On 5 February 2018, a guilty verdict was handed down on 17 of the suspects by the presiding Magistrate in the Nigel Regional Court. 10 men were found guilty of being spectators at this dog fight and were sentenced to two years under strict house arrest (Benedict Ngcobo, Gift Nkabinde, Sabelo Mtshali, Thabiso Mahlangu, Bongani Skakane, Lehlohonolo Nomadola, Thulane Dhlosi, Mxolisi Khumalo, Nkosana Masilela, Sipho Masombuka). All the convicted men were found unfit to possess firearms and found unfit to own dogs and, if found to be in possession of a dog, would be liable to 12 months direct imprisonment. Further to the life-changing conditions of house arrest, the 10 spectators were also sentenced to 360 hours of community service and a total of R50 000 to be paid to the NSPCA. During the course of this trial, one of the accused chose to plead guilty and was sentenced to R20 000 or 20 months imprisonment, which was suspended for five years on the condition that he did not re-offend.

=== South Korea ===
Dog fighting is illegal in South Korea.

=== Taiwan ===
According to Article 10 of the Taiwan Animal Protection Law, any "fights between animals or between animals and people through direct or indirect gambling, entertainment, operation, advertisement and other illegitimate purposes" is prohibited and carries a fine ranging from NT$50,000 to NT$250,000.

=== United Arab Emirates ===
Dog fighting is illegal in the United Arab Emirates according to Federal Law No. 16 of 2007 on animal welfare and its amendments in Federal Law No. 18 of 2016. It is considered an 'act of animal cruelty' that is punishable by either imprisonment for a term not exceeding one year, or a fine of 200,000 United Arab Emirates dirham, or both.

=== United Kingdom ===
Dog fighting is illegal under U.K. law. Despite periodic dog fight prosecutions, however, illegal canine pit battles continued after the Cruelty to Animals Act 1835 of England and Wales. The Protection of Animals Act 1911 was specific in outlawing "the fighting or baiting of animals". Sporting journals of the 18th and 19th centuries depict the Black Country and London as the primary English dog fight centers of the period. In 2019, BBC News released an exposé on a global dog-fighting ring based out of Bulgaria with links to Wales.

=== United States ===
Dog fighting is a felony in all 50 U.S. states, as well as the District of Columbia, Puerto Rico, and the U.S. Virgin Islands. In most of the U.S., a spectator at a dog fight can be charged with a felony, while some areas only consider it a misdemeanor offense. In addition, the federal U.S. Animal Welfare Act makes it unlawful for any person to knowingly sell, buy, possess, train, transport, deliver, or receive any dog for purposes of having the dog participate in an animal fighting venture. The act also makes it unlawful for any person to knowingly use the mail service of the United States Postal Service or any instrumentality of interstate commerce for commercial speech for purposes of advertising a dog for use in an animal fighting venture, promoting or in any other manner furthering an animal fighting venture, except as performed outside the limits of the states of the U.S.

In the second largest dog fighting raid in U.S. history in August 2013, the United States District Court for the Middle District of Alabama handed down the longest prison term ever handed down in a federal dog fighting case: eight years.

According to a Michigan State University College of Law study published in 2005, in the U.S., dog fighting was once completely legal and was sanctioned and promoted during the Colonial period through the Victorian and well into the 20th century. In the second half of the 19th century, dog fighting started to be criminalized in the U.S.

There is a US$5,000 reward for reporting dog fighting to the Humane Society of the United States From the HSUS: How to spot signs of dog fighting in your community: an inordinate number of pit bull-type dogs being kept in one location, especially multiple dogs who are chained and seem unsocialized; dogs with scars on their faces, front legs and stifle area (hind end and thighs); dog fighting training equipment, such as "breaking sticks" or "break sticks" used to pry apart the jaws of dogs locked in battle, which are a foot long, flat on one side and appear to be sharpened; tires or "spring poles" (usually a large spring with rope attached to either end) hanging from tree limbs; or unusual foot traffic coming and going from a location at odd hours.

CNN in 2007 estimated that in the U.S., more than 100,000 people are engaged in dog fighting on a non-professional basis and roughly 40,000 individuals are involved as professionals in the sport of dog fighting as a commercial activity. Top fights are said to have purses of $100,000 or more.

== See also ==
- Breed-specific legislation
- Cockfight
- Cricket fighting
- Cur – Dog-fighting term for a cowardly dog
- Gameness – Dog-fighting term for the willingness to fight
- Spider fighting
