= Gull Dong =

Dog breed

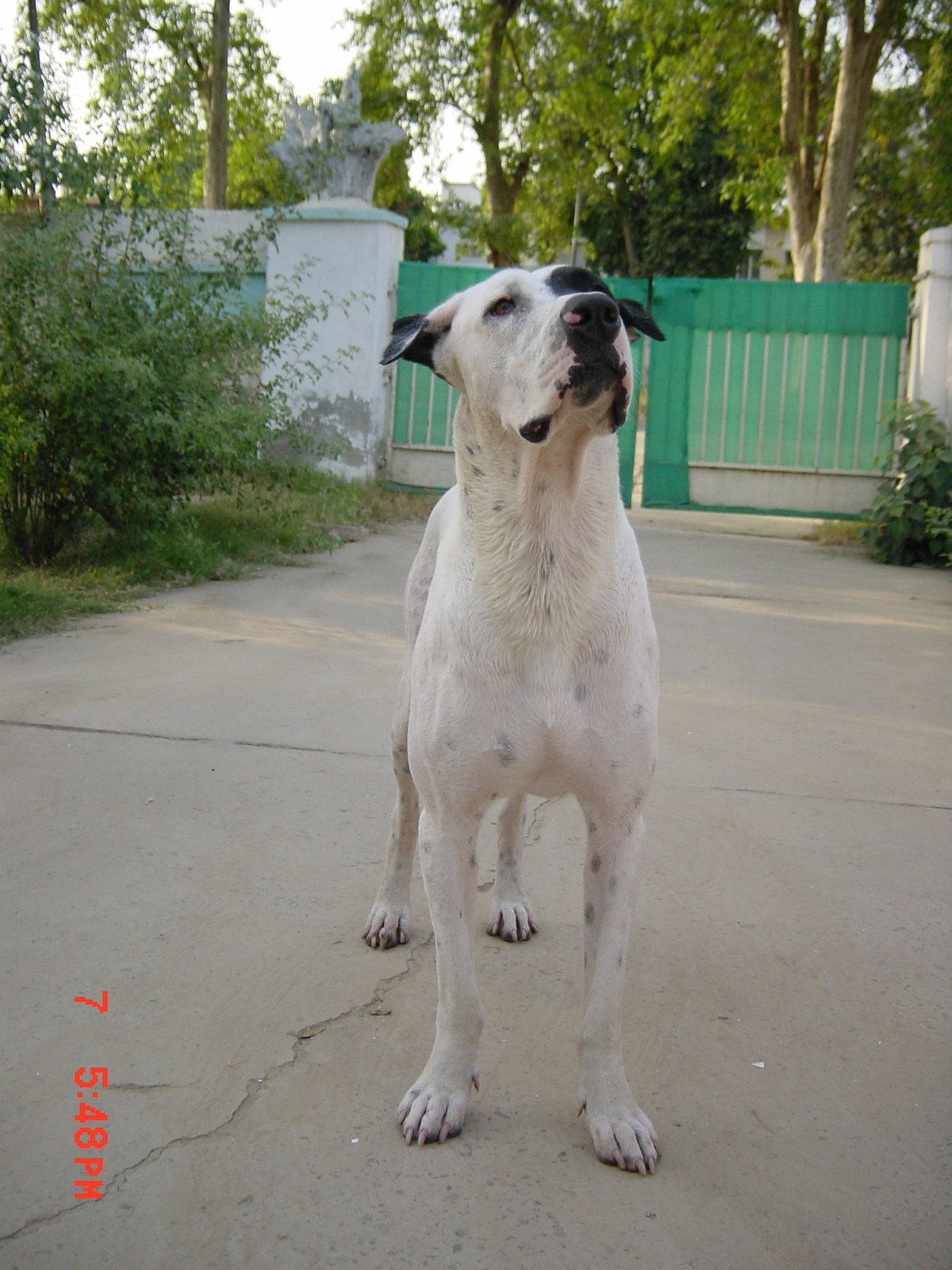
- Origin: India, Pakistan
Traits
Height	Males	18–22 in (46–56 cm)
	Females	18–22 in (46–56 cm)
Weight	Males	55–85 lb (25–39 kg)
	Females	45–65 lb (20–29 kg)
- Coat: Short, dense
- Color: White, white with occasional dark-colored markings on the face and body

The Gull Dong is a dog breed of India and Pakistan that is often used in dog fighting, hunting, and guarding.

== Origin ==
The Gull Dong is the result from when a Gull Terrier is crossed with a Bully Kutta. These started to be crossed in colonial India and the consequent Gull Dong is celebrated in India and Pakistan for its "speed and tenacity".

During the era of the British Raj in India, Bull Terriers were introduced to the northwestern Indian subcontinent, which now includes the modern republics of India and Pakistan. In British India, the Bull Terrier breed soared in popularity, with the Bull Terrier Club of India being established in Calcutta. Bull Terriers were crossed with local breeds to develop the Gull Terrier, often called the Indian Bull Terrier and also now the Pakistani Bull Terrier. The Gull Terrier is a medium-sized dog with short, smooth fur which resembles that of the Staffordshire Bull Terrier.

== See also ==
- List of dog breeds
- List of dog breeds from India
