= Broholm =

Manor House in Funen, Denmark

Coordinates: 55°08′13″N 10°43′40″E

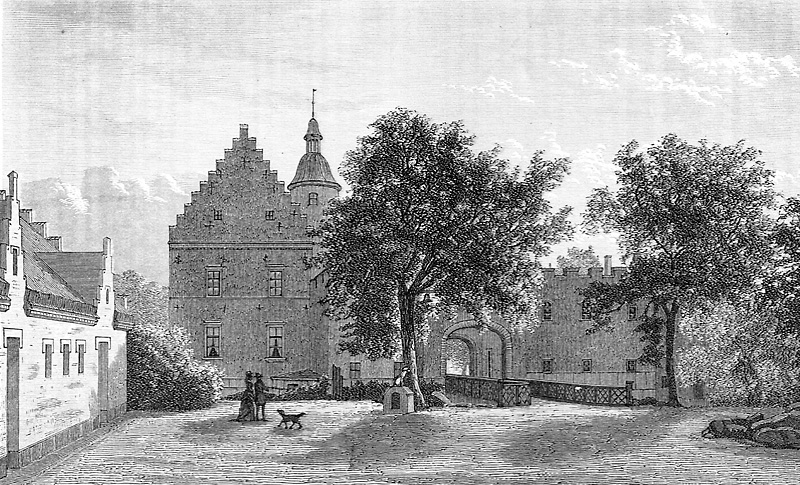
Broholm, an old manor of 1326 located in Funen County, Denmark, 1873

Broholm is an estate and manor house in the parish of Gudme, some 10 km (6.2 mi) northeast of Svendborg, on the Danish island of Funen. The private estate has 591 ha, 168 ha being arable, 395 ha being forest and 28 ha in meadows. There are ten rental properties on the estate as well as an equestrian center with outdoor and indoor riding arenas. Denmark's biggest gold hoard from the Migration Period was found at Broholm.

== History ==
In 1326 the estate was owned by Absalon Jonsen Ulfeldt. From 1641, it was inherited by the Skeel and Sehested families for whom it was the seat from 1759 to 1930. The main wing with its round tower was built for Otte Skeel in 1644. In 1839, it was renovated in the Neo-Gothic style by Gustav Friedrich Hetsch. The corner tower was added in 1895 and the south wing in 1905. Substantial renovation and adaptation work was carried out in the 1920s and the 1950s. Part of the premises has now been converted into a hotel. There is also a museum of antiquities on the estate.

== Archaeological finds ==
One of the archaeological open-air themes recorded is of an antiquary of a log cabin built with flint axes. N.F.B. Sehested, a nobleman of Danish descent, collected flint axes between 1878 and 1881. With these archaeological finds he built a log cabin by using them as tools by handling and sharing them. The cabin was completed in 1887. This cabin was made initially in the Broholm estate where it has been restored.

The Museum of North Antiquities is part of the manor and it has 10,000 antiquaries collected by Sehested, then (1881), owner of the manor. These antiquaries are a collection from an area of 5 miles (8.0 km) around the manor house. These finds are dated to the Stone, Bronze and Iron ages. In addition, some gold ornaments were also found on the estate. Excavations revealed the Broholm gold hoard with an approximate weight of 4.15 kg. Deemed to be the biggest gold hoard of the country from the Migration Period, items include golden bracteates, as well as necklaces and pieces worn on the arm.

== Broholm dog ==
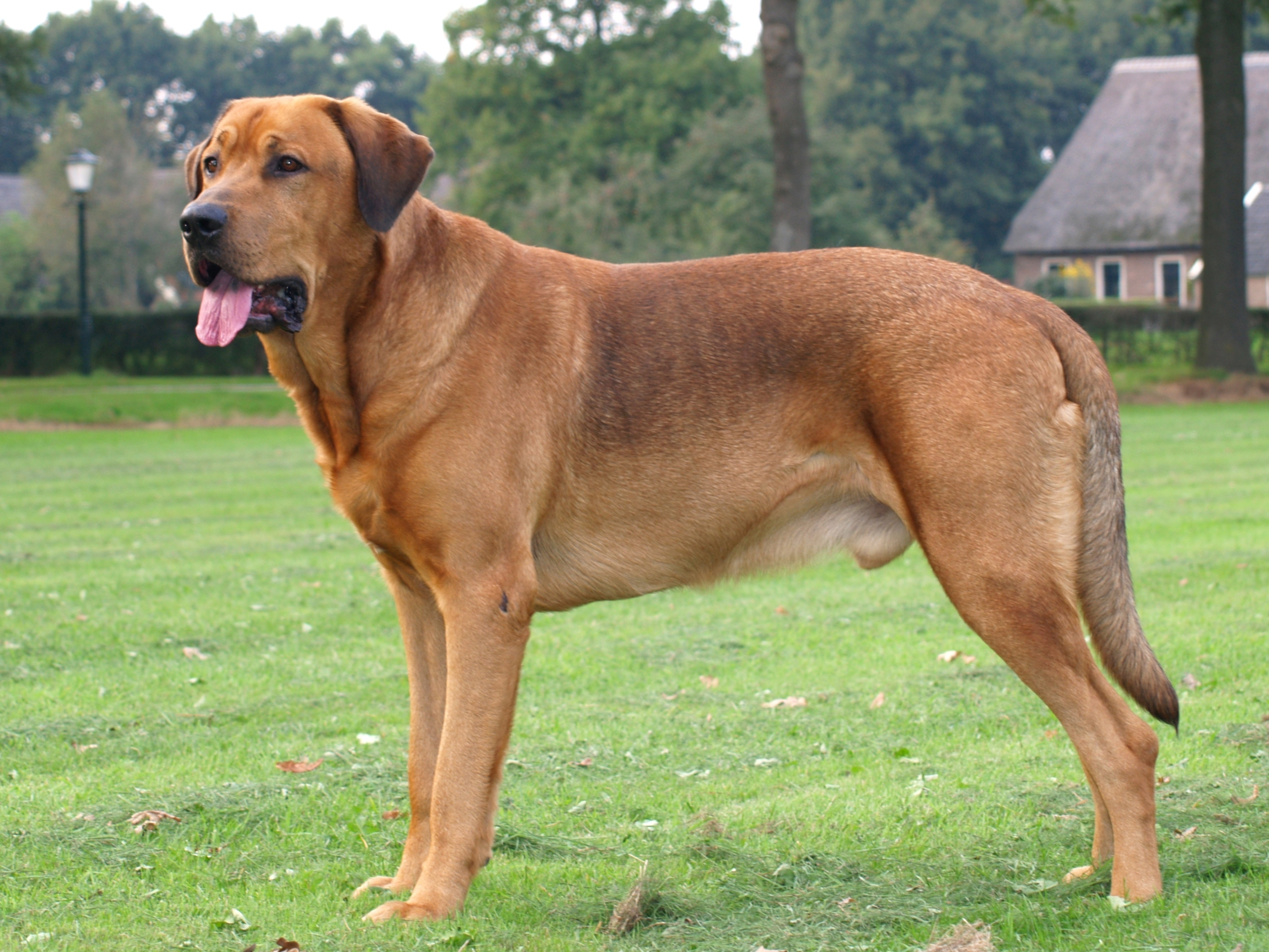
Broholmer dog

The estate is also famous for breeding of Broholmer dogs, of the St. Bernard Dog class of dogs with short hair with links to the pedigree of German Bulldog. These dogs are reported to be a common sight in the Copenhagen neighborhood. It is a national breed and the Copenhagen Kennel Club was charged with breeding them and establishing their pedigree. The Danish dog is also reported to be closely related to the English Mastiff. The better specimens are bred in the Broholm estate and hence given the name Broholmer Dogs
