= Balkasar Bear Sanctuary =

- Interactive map of Balkasar Bear Sanctuary
- 32.939584°N 72.681280°E
- Date opened: November 1, 2010
- Location: Balkassar, Chakwal, Punjab, Pakistan
- Land area: 16 acres (6 ha)
- No. of animals: 68
- No. of species: 3
- Website: PBRC

Balkasar Bear Sanctuary, established in 2010 by Fakhar-i-Abbas, is an animal sanctuary in Balkassar, Chakwal District, Punjab, Pakistan. The sanctuary provides a retirement and rehabilitation home, and veterinary care for rescued bears from bear-baiting events. It houses the endangered species of Asian black bears and Himalayan brown bears. Balkasar Bear Sanctuary also has ornithology and herpetology research stations.

== History ==
In 2000, Kund Bear Sanctuary was established by the World Society for the Protection of Animals (WSPA) through the efforts of Fakhar Abbas, president of WSPA member society Bioresource Research Centre (BRC). The park was a retirement and rehabilitation home to the rescued bears, who could never adapt to life in the wild, because as tame bears they are without teeth. "When our monitoring work officially started in 2003 there were around 300 bears used for baiting. Now, by our recent estimates, there are only around 70 left," said Abbas. With construction planning beginning in 2009, it was in 2010 when the first of many enclosures for a new planned sanctuary in Balkasar was finished. It aimed to provide a more "natural" environment for bears to live.

=== 2010: Nowshera rescue and the blind "Fourth" ===
In late July 2010, heavy flooding resulted in severe damage at Kund Park in Nowshera. As many as 23 bears that were living in the Kund Park sanctuary went lost when the water rose as high as 60 feet (18 m) above river level. By early August 2010, it was reported that Babu, Sohrab and Maylu, three of the Asian black bears that were housed at Kund Park, were rescued from the flooded area and safely transported to a new sanctuary at Balkasar which was still very much under construction. In late 2010, a severely injured female Asian black bear was rescued after she was forced to fight dogs in a bear-baiting event by her owner Fida Hussain. The bear went blind due to her injuries and was kept in quarantine for veterinary care. She was named Chowti, meaning "fourth", and became the fourth resident at the sanctuary.

=== 2011: Layyah and Muzaffargarh rescues ===
In January 2011, two female Himalayan brown bears, Bhoori and Leela, and a female Asian black bear, Kaali, were rescued from a village in Layyah District. WSPA reported that the owners had accepted the alternative livelihood package. Once Bhoori, Leela and Kaali got to the sanctuary, they received necessary medical care. In September 2011, three Asian black bears were rescued from Muzaffargarh and brought to Balkasar Bear Sanctuary. The males, Sawan and Azad, died while in medical care. Post-mortem analysis showed that the former died because of heart failure while latter died due to liver failure. The only female, Nita, survived her fellows and was released into her enclosure after treatment. In October 2011, three more female Asian black bears, Lala, Milla and Shama, were rescued and brought to the quarantine zone of the sanctuary, where they received treatment.

=== 2012: Continued efforts, Pari's death ===
In January 2012, Milla and Shama were released from the quarantine zone into their enclosure shared with Nita. Lala was released in early May 2012 after receiving treatment for her muzzle. Three more bears were rescued in May 2012, a male Himalayan brown bear named Reech and two female Asian black bears Shabnam and Pari. Reech, now the largest and the only male brown bear at the sanctuary, required little treatment before his release. Shabnam was also released soon, but Pari was kept longer in the quarantine zone because of her injured paw.

On night of July 29, 2012, a few days after her release into the enclosure, Pari was presumably bitten by a poisonous snake and died the latter morning, which saddened the staff. Around the same date, three more rescued female Asian black bears, Rene, Sihu and Zilla, were brought to the sanctuary and released into their enclosures after treatment in August 2012. In late August 2012, two more female Asian black bears, Robin and Yarrow, were rescued and brought to the Balkasar Bear Sanctuary. They were released into their enclosure after veterinary care in early November 2012.

== Inhabitants ==
In 2019, there were 54 bears at Balkasar bear sanctuary, vast majority being Asiatic black bears, which rose to 67 in 2020. Currently, the number of bears at sanctuary is 68.

The following bears live in the sanctuary, listed in order of induction:

| Name | Sex | Species | Induction | Notes |
|---|---|---|---|---|
| Babu | M | Asian black bear | August 2010 | His name means "boss". Rescued from flood. |
| Maylu | M | Asian black bear | August 2010 | His name means "bear" in Pashto. Rescued from flood. |
| Sohrab | F | Asian black bear | August 2010 | Her name means "shining". Rescued from flood. |
| Chowti | F | Asian black bear | December 2010 | Her name means "fourth". She was blinded in her life prior to rehabilitation. |
| Bhoori | F | Himalayan brown bear | January 2011 | Her name means "brown". |
| Kaali | F | Asian black bear | January 2011 | Her name means "black". |
| Leela | F | Himalayan brown bear | January 2011 | Her name means "play". |
| Azad | M | Asian black bear | September 2011 | His name means "free". He died shortly after arrival due to liver failure. |
| Nita | F | Asian black bear | September 2011 | Her name means "moral". |
| Sawan | M | Asian black bear | September 2011 | His name means "month of love". He died shortly after arrival due to heart failure. |
| Milla | F | Asian black bear | January 2012 | Her name means "gracious". She has no left eye. |
| Shama | F | Asian black bear | January 2012 | Her name means "candle". |
| Lala | F | Asian black bear | May 2012 | Her name means "tulip". Spent nearly 7 months in quarantine before induction. |
| Reech | M | Himalayan brown bear | May 2012 | His name means "bear" in Urdu. Largest and first male brown bear at the sanctuary. |
| Shabnam | F | Asian black bear | May 2012 | Her name means "morning dew". Rescued along with Reech and Pari. |
| Pari | F | Asian black bear | July 2012 | Her name means "fairy". Died on July 29, 2012, due to snake bite. |
| Rene | F | Asian black bear | August 2012 | Her name means "reborn". |
| Sihu | F | Asian black bear | August 2012 | Her name means "flower". |
| Zilla | F | Asian black bear | August 2012 | Her name means "shadow". |
| Robin | F | Asian black bear | September 2012 | Her name means "love". |
| Yarrow | F | Asian black bear | November 2012 | Her name means "healing". Previously named Sammy. |
| Nehla | F | Asian black bear | March 2015 | Her name means "drink of water". Rescued with Sukhi. |
| Sukhi | F | Asian black bear | March 2015 | Her name means "happy". Rescued with Nehla. |
| Neelum | F | Himalayan brown bear | January 2017 | Her name means "sapphire" in Urdu. |
| Malo | M | Himalayan black bear | - | His name means "strong". |
| Karishma | F | Sloth bear | - | Her name means "unusual" in Hindi. She is the only non-native bear in the sanctuary as she was smuggled from India through ship. |
| Rustum | M | Asian black bear | - | His name means "decoration". |
| Marvie | F | Asian black bear | - | Her name means "beauty redefined". |
| Shoa | M | Asian black bear | - | His name means "calamity" in Hebrew. |
| Sutaiel | M | Himalayan brown bear | - | His name means "highly victimize". |
