= Dogo Cubano =

Extinct Cuban breed of dog

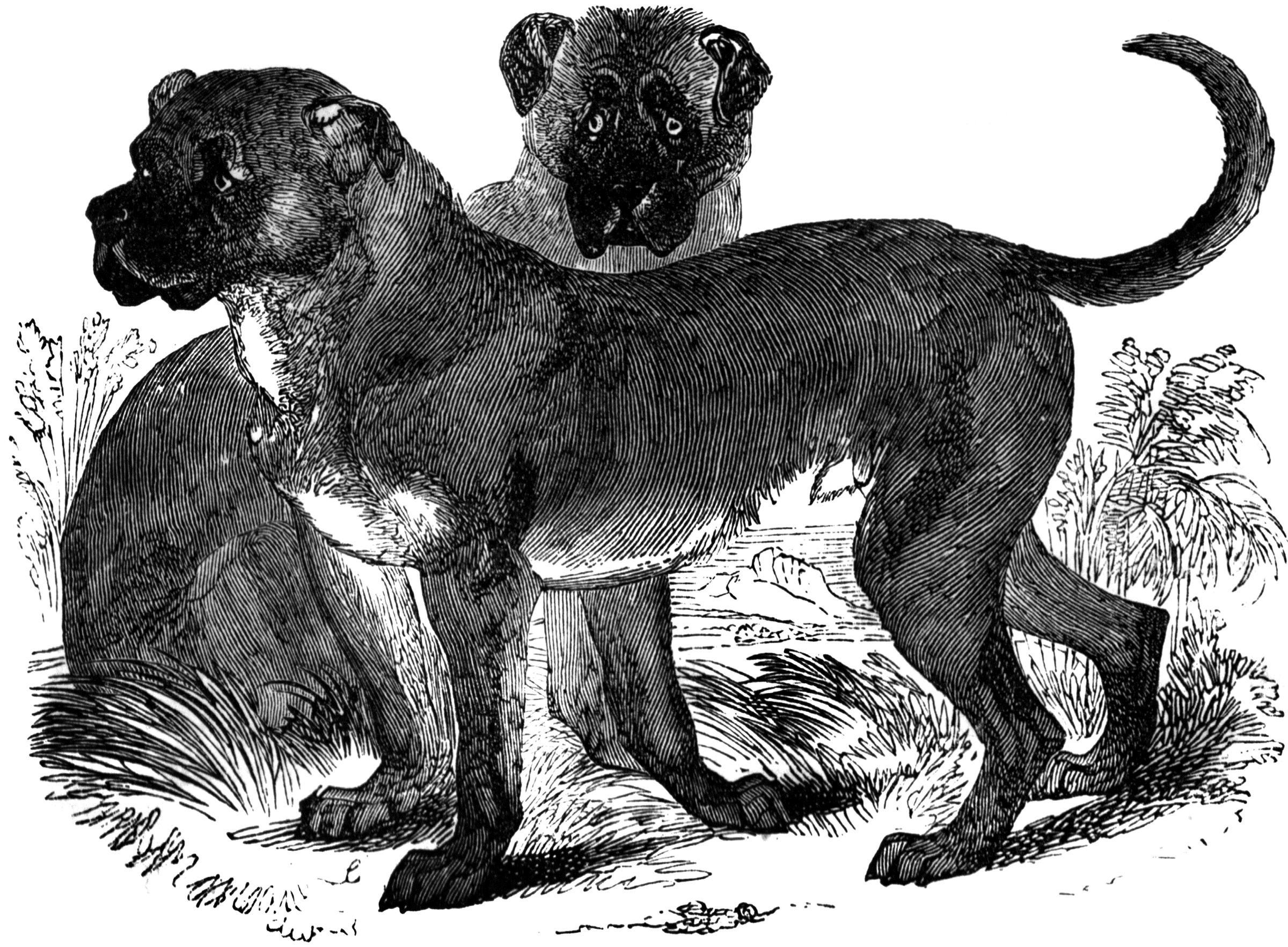
- Other names: Cuban Dog; Cuban Bloodhound; Cuban Bullmastiff
- Origin: Cuba
- Breed status: Extinct
- Notes: Rhodesian Ridgeback is the only standardized descendant

The Dogo Cubano, also called the Cuban Bloodhound or Cuban Bullmastiff, is an extinct Cuban breed of domestic dog. It was of the dogo sub-type of the bullmastiff dog type, which as a general class was used for bull-baiting and dog fighting. The variety was introduced in Cuba to capture runaway slaves (cimarrones). After the abolition of slavery, they merged with other groups, losing their separate identity.

== Appearance ==
They were between a bulldog and a mastiff in size. The muzzle was short, broad, and abruptly truncated. The head was broad and flat, and the lips were deeply pendulous. The medium-sized ears were also partly pendulous, the tail rather short, cylindrical, and turned upwards and forwards towards the tip. They were described as a "rusty wolf-colour", with black face, lips, and legs. They were notable for chasing slaves. It is not known when the dog was considered a specific breed, but by 1803 it is described thus by Robert Dallas: "The animal is the size of a very large hound, with ears erect, which are usually cropped at the points; the nose more pointed, but widening very much towards the after-part of the jaw. His coat, or skin, is much harder than that of most dogs, and so must be the whole structure of the body, as the severe beatings he undergoes in training would kill any other species of dog."

== History ==
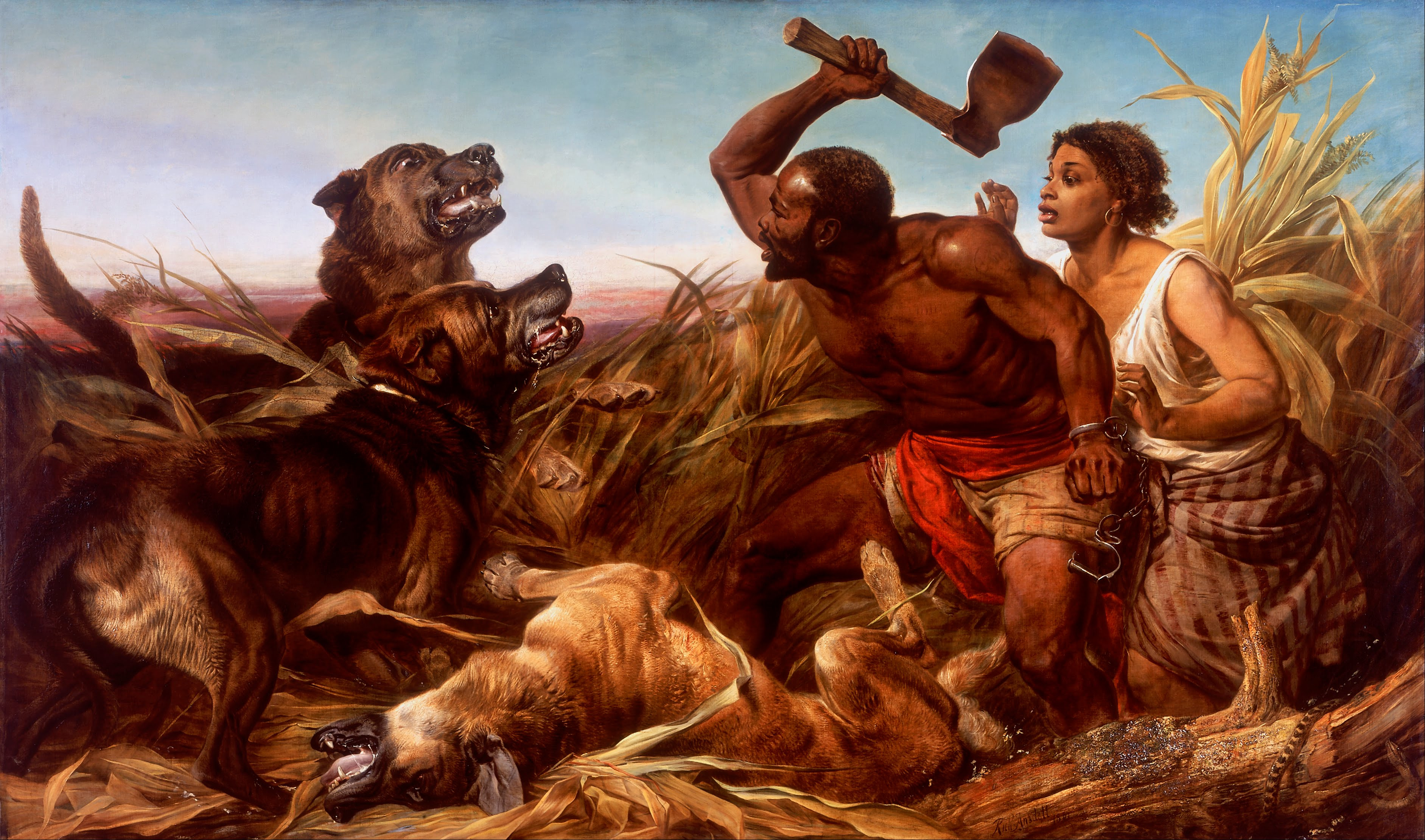
Richard Ansdell, The Hunted Slaves, oil painting, 1861

The Cuban mastiff developed from several breeds of bulldogs, mastiffs and cattle dogs, becoming an ideal fighter and property guardian. It is possible that some specimens of this breed were brought to North America, where they were employed as guard dogs. The breed was used in combat by British forces in Jamaica during the Second Maroon War and French forces in Saint-Domingue during the Saint-Domingue expedition; slave patrols in the Southern United States also made use of the breed. In early 1795, the governor of Jamaica Alexander Lindsay, 6th Earl of Balcarres sent emissaries to Havana in to purchase 100 Cuban mastiffs, after hearing of their successful use by the Spanish in hunting down. Hundreds of hounds were supplied by Cuban breeders to French forces in 1803.
