= Marcelle Meredith =

- Born: Zambia
- Citizenship: South African
- Occupations: Animal welfare advocate; Administrator
- Years active: 1991–2025
- Organization: National Council of Societies for the Prevention of Cruelty to Animals (NSPCA)
- Known for: Leadership in animal protection and welfare
- Successor: Esté Kotzé

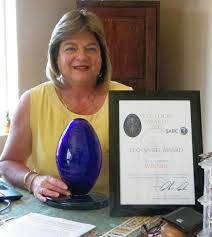
Marcelle Meredith, 2012

Marcelle Meredith was born in Zambia and grew up in South Africa. She was the Chief Executive Officer and Executive Director of the National Council of Societies for the Prevention of Cruelty to Animals (NSPCA) from 1991 to 2025. Meredith retired on 30 June 2025, handing over the position of CEO of the NSPCA to Esté Kotzé.

Meredith is a former Board member of the World Animal Protection and has served on the organisation's Board for more than 15 years, representing Africa.

== Awards ==
In 2012, Meredith was the winner in the Eco-Angel award category of the Enviropaedia Eco-Logic Awards. In the same year Meredith received the Humane Society International Award for Extraordinary Commitment and Achievement recognizing an individual animal protectionist (particularly those from developing countries) whose hard work and compassion have led him or her to exceptional levels of bravery and self-sacrifice in striving to mitigate and prevent the suffering of animals from neglect, cruelty and exploitation.

In 2015, the World Animal Protection awarded Meredith with the Jeannette McDermott award for animal welfare. The award was created in Canada by the World Animal Protection in 1996 “in recognition of someone’s life devoted to animal welfare.” Dominique Bellemare, Chairman of WAP Canada stated: “Marcelle has done amazing work for the past decade and for the cause of animal welfare. She has used her years on the international platform to advance the cause of animal welfare in Africa. I thank her profusely for all her work and dedication.”

In 2016, Meredith received the Livestock Welfare Coordinating Committee (LWCC) award in recognition of her exceptional services to livestock welfare over the decades.
