= Córdoba fighting dog =

Extinct dog type

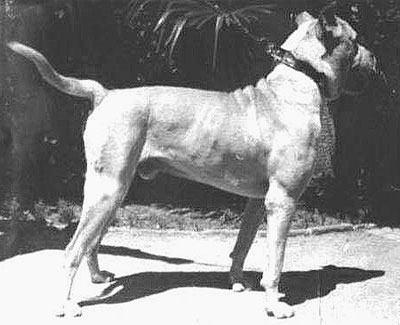
- Image of Cordoba Fighting Dog
- Other names: Perro de Pelea Cordobés; Córdobese dog Córdoba dog
- Origin: Argentina

The Córdoba fighting dog (Spanish: viejo perro de pelea cordobés) was a type of dog indigenous to Córdoba, Argentina, that resulted from crossbreeding old mastiff types of unknown pedigree. They were purposely bred for the sport of dog fighting until the early 20th century. They became extinct after dog fighting became illegal in Argentina in 1954.

== History ==
The Córdoba fighting dog was a dog type originating from Córdoba, Argentina utilizing Spanish Mastiffs, Bull Terriers and early Bulldogs brought to South America.

In the 1920s, Antonio Nores Martinez and his brother Agustin were inspired to develop a dog that could hunt wildcats, boar, fox and other vermin that were harmful to the region's agriculture. Over time, Martinez developed a new breed of pedigreed dog by repeatedly crossbreeding the Córdoba fighting dogs with modern breeds of dogs that were internationally recognized, such as the Boxer, Dogue de Bordeaux, Bulldog, Pointer, Bull Terrier, Irish Wolfhound, Great Pyrenees, and Great Dane. As a result of that purposeful breeding, the Dogo Argentino was developed.

In 1954, Argentina passed Article 3.8 of Law 14.346 on the Ill-Treatment and Acts of Cruelty to Animals which explicitly prohibits "carrying out public or private acts of animal fights, fights of bulls and heifers, or parodies [thereof], in which animals are killed, wounded or harassed." Already quite rare and with no other purpose, the Córdoba dog became extinct.

== Characteristics ==
Often described as "large, white and ferocious," the Córdoba fighting dog was noted for its willingness to fight to the death and its high pain tolerance. The dog was so aggressive that fights would arise even during mating.

== See also ==
- Dog fighting
- List of dog breeds
- List of extinct dog breeds
