= NSPCA =

South African animal welfare organisation

National Council of SPCAs
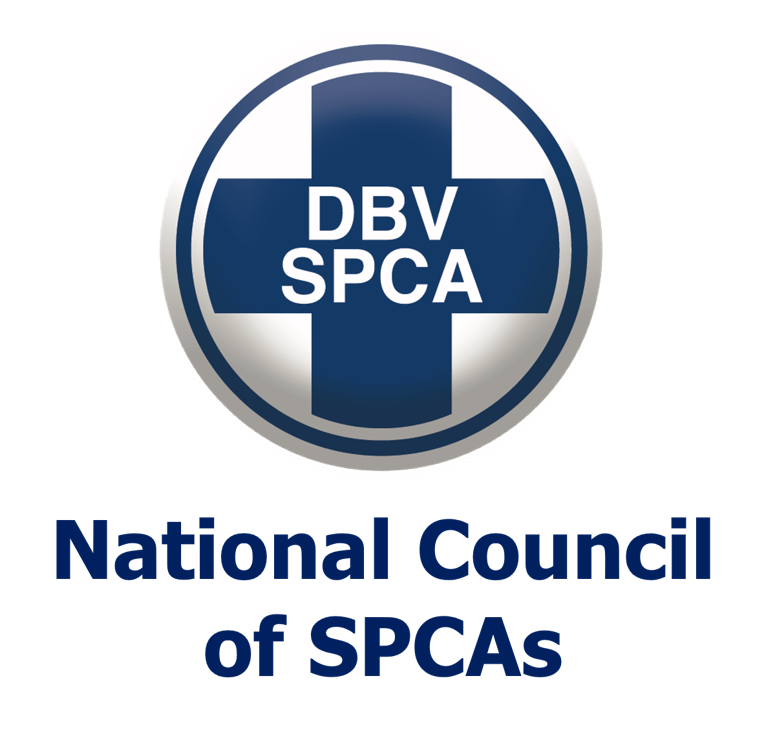
- Abbreviation: NSPCA
- Founded: 1955
- Type: Non-Profit
- Purpose: Animals Welfare
- Location: Alberton, South Africa
- Region served: South Africa
- Leader: Esté Kotzé (CEO, 2025 -) Marcelle Meredith (CEO, 1991 - 2025)
- Revenue: R25 165 077,00 (2016)
- Employees: 48
- Website: www.nspca.co.za

National Council of Societies for the Prevention of Cruelty to Animals (NSPCA), also known as the National Council of SPCAs, is the largest and oldest animal welfare organisation in South Africa. The NSPCA handles all matters relating to animal cruelty involving all animal species and is a registered Non-Profit Organisation registered with the Department of Social Development.

The NSPCA is referred to as "NDBV" in Afrikaans (one of the 12 official languages in South Africa) and is also known as Nasionale Raad van Dierebeskermingsverenigings (NDBV). SPCA is DBV in Afrikaans.

== Mission and Vision ==
The mission of the NSPCA is to prevent cruelty and promote the welfare of all animals, whilst their vision is to end animal cruelty in South Africa and engender compassion for all animals.

== History ==
The NSPCA was founded in 1955 and was named the federation of Society for the Prevention of Cruelty to Animals (SPCAs). The aim was to provide a forum to bring uniformity to welfare legislation and standards in South Africa. The NSPCA later changed its name to the National Council of SPCAs. There are 68 member SPCAs in South Africa which are governed by the Society for the Prevention of Cruelty to Animals 169 of 1993 which is administered by the NSPCA, thus making the NSPCA a statutory body. The SPCA Act also gives the NSPCA locus standi to act on behalf of animals in South Africa.

=== Tuli Elephant Case ===
The NSPCA became well known for its involvement and handling of the Tuli Elephant case in 1998. The case involved thirty (30) juvenile elephants that were forcibly removed from their natural herds in the Tuli area of Botswana. The elephants had been transported to South Africa and were being trained using a circus elephant and individuals who had come out from Malaysia to do so. The training methods used were cruel and inhumane. A guilty verdict was given in court, this was a landmark achievement for the NSPCA and wild animals in South Africa.

=== Nelson Mandela Patron-in-Chief ===
On 24 November 1994 Nelson Mandela, the former president of South Africa, became the Patron-in-Chief of the NSPCA. an honour he held until his death in 2013. After Mandela's death, the NSPCA described him as a man dedicated to human kind, to his country, friend and foe, animal and human; he stood for equality throughout his life.

=== Donating towards 2004 Asia Tsunami ===
The NSPCA donated funding towards the assistance of animals affected by 2004 Indian Ocean earthquake and tsunami in Asia. The funding was donated to assist the animals directly that were affected by the tsunami.

=== Tsakane dog fighting case ===
In November 2013 the NSPCA arrested 18 suspects who were caught in the act of illegal dog fighting in Tsakane in the East Rand. The suspects were arrested and charged for illegal dog fighting. Dog fighting is a criminal and prosecutable offence in South Africa. Fourteen (14) pit bull type dogs were confiscated from the property and were used for fighting purposes. Some of the dogs were badly injured as a result of the fighting and had to be humanely euthanised. On 5 February 2018 a guilty verdict was handed down on 17 of the suspects by the presiding Magistrate in the Nigel Regional Court. Ten men were found guilty of being spectators at this dog fight and were sentenced to 2 years under strict house arrest (Benedict Ngcobo, Gift Nkabinde, Sabelo Mtshali, Thabiso Mahlangu, Bongani Skakane, Lehlohonolo Nomadola, Thulane Dhlosi, Mxolisi Khumalo, Nkosana Masilela, Sipho Masombuka). All the convicted men were found unfit to possess firearms and found unfit to own dogs, and, if found in possession of a dog, would be liable to 12 months direct imprisonment. Further to the life changing conditions of house arrest, the ten spectators were also sentenced to 360 hours of community service and a total of R50 000 to be paid to the NSPCA. During the course of this trial one of the accused chose to plead guilty and was sentenced to R20 000 or 20 months imprisonment which was suspended for 5 years on condition that he did not re-offend.

=== The Thandi Modise Case ===
A large number of farm animals died after being neglected on a farm owned by Thandi Modise, chairperson of the National Council of Provinces in July 2014. In 2018, the NSPCA mounted a private prosecution with the assistance of AfriForum, as the National Prosecuting Authority (NPA) failed to bring the matter to court.

Modise had responded to the claims by stating that she was "learning" how to farm, and that she had appointed a farm manager, but he had abandoned his duties to attend to a family matter. Approximately four months later, it was reported that conditions on the farm had improved, that Modise's cattle had been receiving sufficient food and were in an "acceptable condition".

=== Private Prosecutions ===
The NSPCA had its victory in the Constitutional Court of South Africa on 8 December 2016 when the organisation won its case it brought before the Court to institute Private Prosecutions in terms of Section 8 of the Criminal Procedure Act, 1977. This after the organisation lost its cases it brought before the North Gauteng High Court and the Supreme Court of Appeal of South Africa on the same matter of Private Prosecutions. The reason the NSPCA brought the case before the Courts is because despite "overwhelming" evidence of animal cruelty or abuse‚ the National Prosecuting Authority of South Africa (NPA) declined to prosecute the cases brought by the organisation, resulting in animal abusers not being charged on charges of animal cruelty. The Constitutional Court of South Africa also ruled that the Respondents, The Minister of Justice and Constitutional Development and the National Director of Public Prosecutions, were to pay the organisations costs in all three applications.

=== East London Zoo charged for cruelty to animals ===
The Wildlife Protection Unit of the NSPCA investigated a complaint in May 2017 of a baboon being abused in the care of the East London Zoo which is state owned and managed by the Buffalo City Metropolitan Municipality. The baboon was known as William and was paralysed, dragging his body around in the enclosure. The East London Zoo failed to provide the baboon with veterinary care. The baboon had to be humanely euthanised. The NSPCA laid criminal charges against the East London Zoo and Buffalo City Metropolitan Municipality.

=== Circus withdraws case against NSPCA ===
In 2016, Brian Boswell of the Boswell Circus, brought a civil case against the National Council of SPCAs (NSPCA), claiming a loss of income said to have been caused by the organisation speaking out against the circus's use of wild animals in performances, and sued the organisation for R16 349 805.36 plus interest. Some three years later, Mr Boswell and the Circus have withdrawn the case against the NSPCA and have tendered the NSPCA's legal costs. Following the cancellation of and poor attendance at shows in certain towns due to public outcry, Mr Boswell instituted legal action against the organisation, blaming them for the cancellations and poor attendance, the alleged forced removal of wild animals from the circus performances and therefore causing a loss of income. The NSPCA defended the matter by filing legal papers and also called for financial documentation and further information from Mr Boswell, who was required to prove the loss of income. Mr Boswell withdrew the case and will be paying the NSPCA's legal costs.

=== High Court Rules in favour of Lions and NSPCA ===
The Pretoria High Court ruled in favour of the NSPCA in a matter between the NSPCA and the Minister of the Department of Environmental Affairs (DEA) and the South African Predator Breeders Association regarding the lion bone export quotas and the implications for the welfare of captive lion. Judge Kollapen found that the quotas set in 2017 and 2018 for the export of lion bone skeletons were unlawful and unconstitutional, and did not follow due process. It was further stated that the Minister and the Department of Environmental Affairs disregarded the welfare of captive lion in setting the quota, and whilst welfare is not their mandate, the Minister and the DEA must take the welfare of captive lion, and other captive wildlife into consideration in decision making. The NSPCA have recently opened a number of criminal cases against captive lion facilities that have neglected, and in some instances, completely disregarded the welfare of their lions. For these reasons, the NSPCA launched this application as the lion bone quota directly impacts the welfare of captive lions.

== Mandate and Powers of SPCA Inspectors ==
An SPCA inspector's primary role is to respond to complaints about the ill-treatment or neglect of a range of animals in the community. A significant part of an inspector's duties is education. Often, animals are unintentionally neglected and those responsible are genuinely upset by the incident. There may be calls to emergency situations where animals require immediate assistance or rescue. Some instances may necessitate court action, so the inspector is required to gather evidence and prepare a prosecution file.

In South Africa SPCA Inspectors are authorised in terms of the Animals Protection Act 71 of 1962 (as amended) and the Performing Animals Protection Act No. 24 of 1935 (as amended), undertaking approximately 93 percent of all animal welfare investigations and prosecutions in South Africa. This means that in terms of both the Acts mentioned above, qualified inspectors with magisterial authorisation have the powers of a police officer. These powers include the obtaining of search and seizure warrants to enter any premisses and seize any animal to prevent suffering and the arrest of any person for contravening the provisions of the Animals Protection Act No 71 of 1962 if there is reasonable grounds to believe that the ends of justice will be defeated in the delay of obtaining a warrant.

== Operational Units ==
The NSPCA has its own units who work towards ending animal cruelty in the lives of animals used in research, farm animals, wildlife, animals used in sports and entertainment, dogs in security, aquaculture and dogs used in the cruel practice of dog fighting. The NSPCA deals with national issues and has ten operational units, namely:

- Animal Ethics Unit
- Communications Unit
- Farm Animal Protection Unit
- Society Liaison Unit
- Special Investigations Unit
- Special Projects Unit
- Training Unit
- Wildlife Protection Unit

=== Animal Ethics Unit ===
The goal of the NSPCA Animal Ethics Unit is the replacement of animal experiments with humane alternatives. Until this can be achieved, we work to ensure that the minimum number of animals are used, and ensure that their welfare is upheld.

The NSPCA Animal Ethics Unit adopts a constructive, practical approach:

- Judging every issue individually by developing more effective systems of ethical review;
- Critically questioning the necessity and justification for animal use in research and education;
- Arguing the need to reduce the conflict between the interests of animals and of science;
- Working to improve National Standards and legislation that regulates or creates a demand for animal use; and
- Monitoring animal welfare by conducting regular inspections at animal research facilities and serving on Animal Ethics Committees.

=== Communications Unit ===
The NSPCA Communications Unit includes Marketing, Public Relations and Web Management/Social Media functions as a support base and deals with branding, relationship management, publicity, communicating with the media and general public and securing donor funding. A key component of the Communications Unit is to showcase the NSPCA as the leader in animal welfare in South Africa and we strive to convey our messages in a way that is credible, visible and truthful. This portfolio has no budget and depend on donated services which includes creative work to develop advertising material, the production of advertisements and the placing of them in publications, on radio or on web sites and social media platforms.

=== Farm Animal Protection Unit ===
The NSPCA believes that all animals are deserving of consideration, even those being raised to feed people and other animals or those raised for their skins. We work towards persuading consumers, industry and government to build a future where cruelty is prevented. The NSPCA Farm Animal Protection Unit inspects facilities where farm animals are kept, used or farmed. Some of the areas covered by the Unit are intensive farming, draught animals, pounds, export, abattoirs, sale yards, transportation and small scale farmers. The Units activities include investigation of complaints, routine inspections and disaster response and assistance. More farm animals are used than any other type of animal in South Africa and farming is more and more seen as a lucrative source of income, especially by small scale farmers. The transition towards small scale farming, however, is not without effect on animal welfare and often aggravates welfare problems instead of solving them. These issues and problems are not limited to any one species of animal. There are certain legally acceptable farming systems that we are opposed to and believe are inhumane. While we strive to change perceptions and legislation, we also have to do everything possible to assist any animals that are suffering.

=== Society Liaison Unit ===
The main objectives of the NSPCA Society Liaison Unit are to uphold and enforce the provisions of the SPCA Act No 169 of 1993, in terms of which its duty is to ensure that all 90 SPCAs comply with the policies and standards that have been formulated with these SPCAs and adopted over the years. The Unit actively promote co-operation between member SPCAs and their interests by providing advice, guidance, training, educational material, assistance with complex cases and, when necessary, making national appeals on behalf of struggling SPCAs.

=== Special Investigations Unit ===
One of the responsibilities of the NSPCA Special Investigations Unit is to address the illegal practice of dog fighting. Dog fighting raids and pit bull cruelty court cases initiated by the NSPCA have brought public attention to this illegal practice in addition to bringing it to the attention of the private and governmental sectors. The NSPCA has gained credibility in South Africa and among the international community by presenting accurate, fact-based information on an individual and public scale.

Special Investigation Unit staff work to ensure that dog fighting cases already in the legal system continue to move forward and receive attention from the National Council and the judicial system, as well as public support. The Unit takes part in rescuing fight victims and, as far as possible, in seeking prosecution of perpetrators. It also provides guidance and support to SPCAs around the country in their campaigns against dog fighting.

Various dog fighting raids and pit bull cruelty court cases initiated by the NSPCA have presented opportunities and platforms towards bringing this cruel practice to the attention of both the private and the governmental sector. Ensuring that accurate information, based on fact, presented on an individual and public scale, has resulted in the NSPCA gaining credibility not only in South Africa but also amongst the international community. Unit staff ensure that dog fighting cases already in the legal system continue forward and benefit from determined National Council and judicial system attention as well as maintained public support. The NSPCA Special Investigations Unit plays an active part in rescuing fight victims and ensuring, as far as possible, that perpetrators of dog fighting are brought to book. The Unit provides extensive guidance and support to SPCAs around the country to assist them in their individual campaigns against dog fighting.

=== Special Projects Unit ===
As the name suggests, the NSPCA Special Projects Unit is responsible for monitoring the welfare of animals which are used in recreational, guarding and exhibition activities. It also deals with animals that do not fit into the traditional production, companion or wild categories. The issues dealt with cover a diverse range of activities, and encompass animal husbandry, training and application. The Unit focuses on the following industries: pigeon racing, aquaculture, security companies using dogs, dog racing and the transportation of animals through our ports of entry and exit (borders). The Unit also works extensively on humane deterrents or control of "problem animals" and electronic training devices.

=== Training Unit ===
Training is offered internally to SPCAs around South Africa (Inspectors, Refreshers, Seniors, Committees and Field Officers). It is essential, particularly in the case of new inspectors, that a sound and thorough knowledge of the law and legal procedures is imparted. The lecturers are all specialists in their fields and are thus able to answer questions and allow candidates an insight into a variety of subjects and provide for a valuable learning experience. The NSPCA Training Unit also offers appropriate training packages to stakeholders in the different fields of operation. Training of service providers assists in equipping officials to better understand and address animal welfare concerns in their varied work environments.

=== Wildlife Protection Unit ===
The NSPCA Wildlife Protection Unit has been in operation since 1987 and gained national recognition for its expertise and sound approach to the welfare of wildlife, often being called upon to assist in the resolution of practical problems. National issues and problems are addressed through the development of standards for the benefit of animals within the wildlife industry. The Unit is also active in providing welfare input into national and provincial legislation which control wild animal use. The Unit's activities include – wildlife rescue operations, lobbying to outlaw unethical practices, monitoring of conditions in zoos, sanctuaries and rehabilitation centres, elephant-back safaris, captive predator facilities et al. through pro-active inspections and complaint investigations and assisting SPCAs around the country with wildlife issues in their respective areas. The Unit provides awareness training on the Animal Protection Act, and its implications for captive wildlife facilities and wild animal welfare.

== SPCA Logo ==
The SPCA logo in South Africa is owned and trademarked by the NSPCA. The SPCA logo may not be reproduced, copied or used without the express written permission of the NSPCA.

== Awards ==
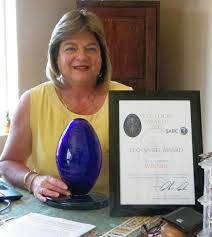
In 2012, Marcelle was the winner in the Eco-Angel award category of the Enviropaedia Eco-Logic Awards.

In 2012, then-Executive Director of the NSPCA, Marcelle Meredith, was the winner in the Eco-Angel award category of the Enviropaedia Eco-Logic Awards. In the same year, she received the Humane Society International Award for Extraordinary Commitment and Achievement recognizing an individual animal protectionist (particularly those from developing countries) whose hard work and compassion have led him or her to exceptional levels of bravery and self-sacrifice in striving to mitigate and prevent the suffering of animals from neglect, cruelty and exploitation.

In 2015, Meredith was awarded the Jeannette McDermott award for animal welfare. The award was created in Canada by the World Animal Protection in 1996 "in recognition of someone’s life devoted to animal welfare." Dominique Bellemare, Chairman of WAP Canada stated: "Marcelle has done amazing work for the past decade and for the cause of animal welfare. She has used her years on the international platform to advance the cause of animal welfare in Africa. I thank her profusely for all her work and dedication." In the same year, Grace De Lange, a Senior Inspector working in the Farm Animal Protection Unit of the NSPCA, was awarded the Medal of Heroism Award at the Annual Leadership for Women in Law Enforcement Conference.

In 2016, then-Vice Chairperson of the NSPCA, Dr Jane Marston‚ won the Annual Women in Law Enforcement Award at the Indaba Hotel outside Johannesburg, South Africa. Marston has been the NSPCA's pro bono lawyer since 1997 and has been assisting the NSPCA on all cases through representation and preparation‚ and obtaining Senior Counsel to become involved. In the same year the NSPCA won gold for its anti-dogfighting campaign "Start a Dog Fight" at the Assegai Integrated Marketing Awards. The aim of the campaign was to bring about awareness of the seriousness of dogfighting in South Africa. The campaign was steered by Grey Advertising. Marcelle Meredith, also received the Livestock Welfare Coordinating Committee award in recognition of her exceptional services to livestock welfare over the decades.

In 2017, the Manager of the NSPCA Special Investigations Unit at the time, Senior Inspector Wendy Willson, was awarded the Medal of Heroism Award at the Annual Leadership for Women in Law Enforcement Conference. This is the third year in a row that an NSPCA representative has received an award at this annual ceremony in recognition for commitment to law enforcement.

In 2018, the Manager of the NSPCA Training and Donkey Upliftment Units at the time, Senior Inspector Morgane James, was awarded the Leadership Award at the Annual Leadership for Women in Law Enforcement Awards held on 23 May 2018. Morgane James has dedicated her life to the welfare of animals and has carried various responsibilities within the SPCA movement for over three decades. Morgane James has played an integral part in the achievements of the NSPCA. James has worked tirelessly to keep dog racing from being legalised in this country. She founded the NSPCA's Donkey Upliftment Projects to address the plight of working donkeys and to provide workable solutions to the people who depend on these animals for their livelihoods and thus improve the welfare of animals in their care. Along with promoting kindness to working donkeys, James has also worked extensively to address the illegal and inhumane donkey skin trade. She has also devoted much of her time and expertise to combating dog fighting in South Africa.
