= Dogo Argentino =

Argentine breed of dog

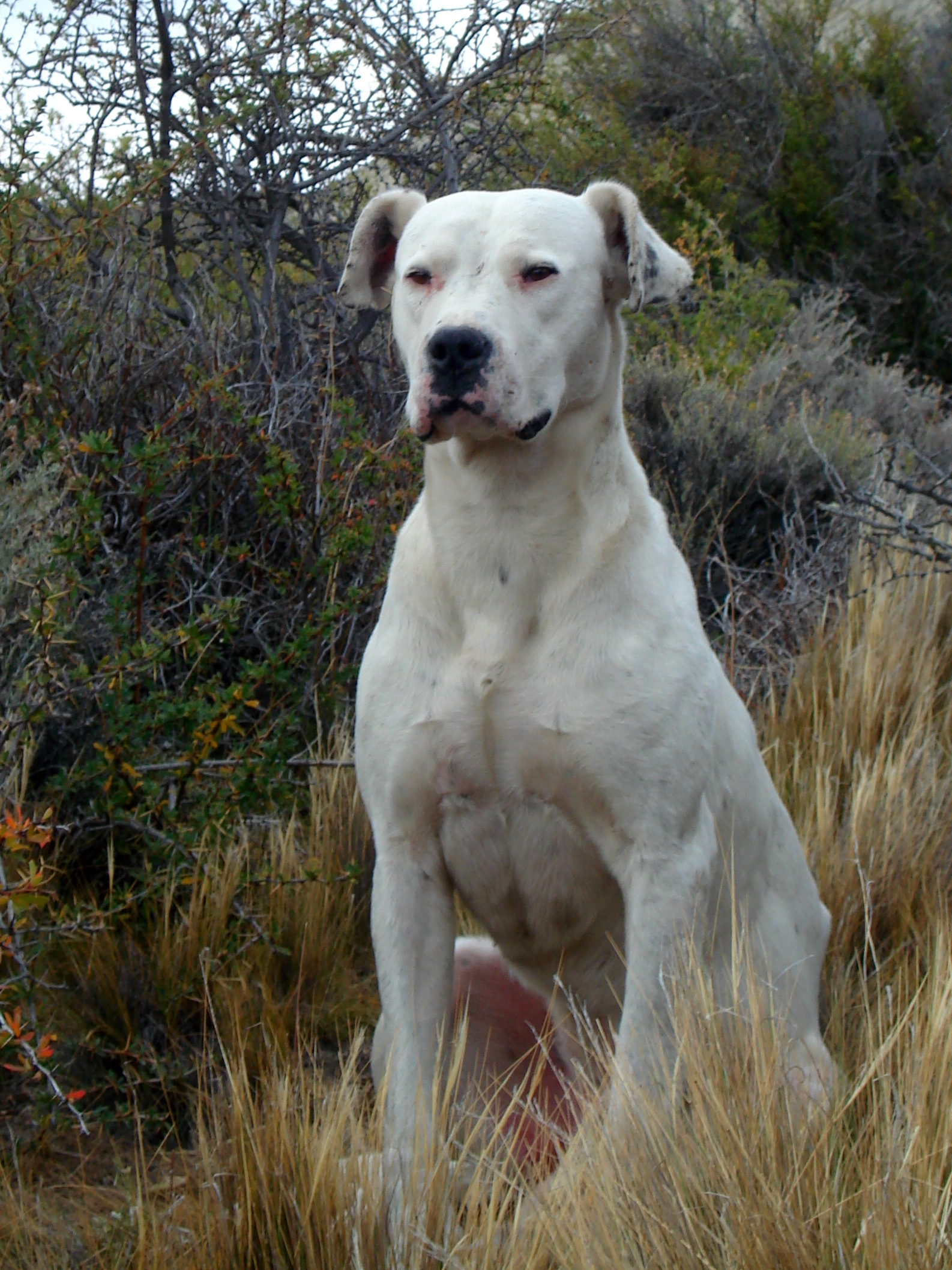
- Origin: Argentina
- Foundation stock: Old Cordoba Fighting Dog; Bull Terrier; Pyrenean Mastiff; Irish Wolfhound
Traits
Height	Males	60–68 cm (24–27 in)
	Females	60–65 cm (24–26 in)
Weight	Males	40–48.5 kg (90–105 lb)
	Females	40–43 kg (90–95 lb)
- Coat: short
- Colour: white
Kennel club standards
- Federación Cinológica Argentina: standard
- Fédération Cynologique Internationale: standard

The Dogo Argentino (plural Dogos Argentinos) is an Argentine breed of large dog of mastiff type. It was bred in the early twentieth century in Córdoba in central Argentina, primarily for hunting large game such as peccaries, wild boar, and pumas. The foundation stock included the now extinct Córdoba fighting dog, a fighting dog of bulldog type, a Bull Terrier and a Mastín del Pirineo.

== History ==
In the 1920s Antonio Nores Martinez, a young student of Córdoba in central Argentina, set out with his brother Augustin Nores Martinez to create a new breed of big game hunting dog, especially wild boar. He wanted it to have the fighting qualities of the Old Cordoba Fighting Dog, but with greater size and strength. He started with a Bull Terrier bitch with considerable fighting ability, which he bred to a spotted fighting dog of bulldog type. He selected and inter-bred their offspring, selecting for white coat colour and rejecting any animal that was retrognathous (undershot). In the eighth generation he introduced a Pyrenean mastiff bitch; by the twelfth generation his dogs were breeding true. They became well known for their success in the ring. Nores Martinez later introduced crosses with a variety of other dogs including the Irish Wolfhound, Boxer, Great Dane, Bull Terrier, Dogue de Bordeaux, and Spanish Mastiff.

In 1947 he presented his breed to the Club de Cazadores ('hunter's club') of Buenos Aires; in 1948 a breed standard was published in the magazine Diana. Antonio Nores Martinez was murdered in 1956; however Augustin, now an international ambassador, would continue to promote the Dogo during his travels.

The Dogo was definitively accepted by the Fédération Cynologique Internationale in 1973.

== Characteristics ==
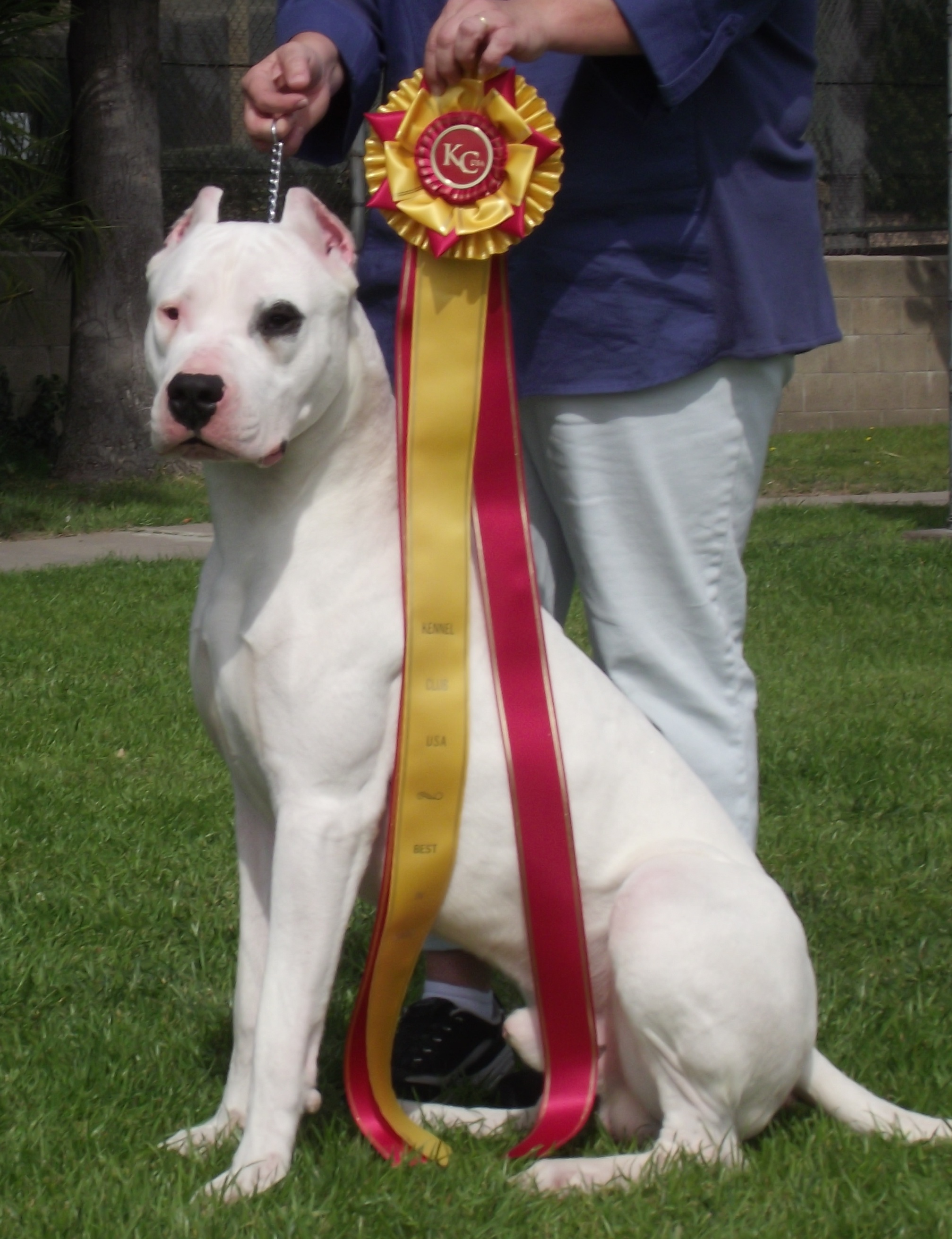
A show dog

The Dogo Argentino is a large dog: weights for dogs are some 40–45 kg (90–100 lb), for bitches slightly less; heights at the withers are in the range 60–65 cm (24–26 in) for bitches and 60–68 cm (24–27 in) for dogs. The length of the body is slightly greater than the height at the withers, up to a maximum of one tenth more.

The coat is short and always white. A single black or dark-coloured spot on the head is tolerated as long as it is no larger than one tenth of the size of the head. The muzzle is of about the same length as the skull.

Like many other breeds, the Dogo has some genetic predisposition to congenital deafness; it is also predisposed to laryngeal paralysis/polyneuropathy complex. The dogs usually live for some 10 to 12 years.

== Use ==
The Dogo is kept principally for hunting large game such as peccaries, wild boar, and pumas. It has a good nose, good speed, and good stamina; it may occasionally be trained for police or military work.

== Regulation ==
Ownership of dogs of this breed is illegal or restricted in some countries, including Australia, Austria (Lower Austria, Vienna and Vorarlberg), the Cayman Islands, Cyprus, Denmark, Fiji, Hong Kong, Iceland, New Zealand, Norway, Singapore, Turkey, Ukraine, and the United Kingdom.
