= Bully Kutta =

Dog breed originating in South Asia

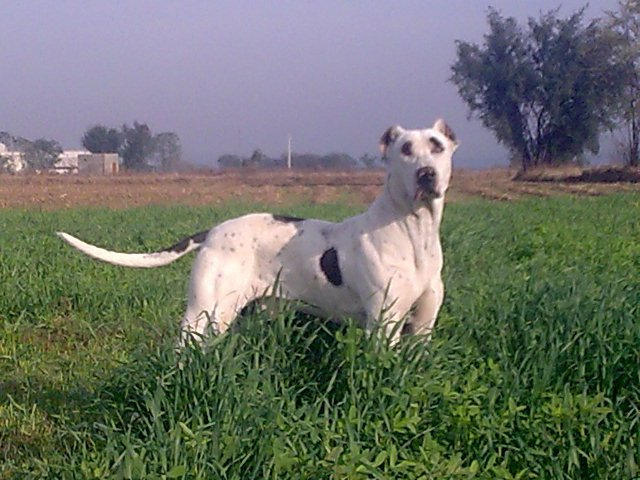
- Image of Bully Kutta
- Other names: Alangu Mastiff; Indian mastiff Indian bully Pakistani mastiff Sindhi mastiff
- Origin: Indian subcontinent
Traits
Height	Males	76–84 centimetres (30–33 in)
	Females	75–80 centimetres (30–31 in)
Weight	Males	70–90 kilograms (150–200 lb)
	Females	60–70 kilograms (130–150 lb)
- Coat: short
- Color: black, red, brindle, white, fawn, harlequin
- Litter size: 1-8

The Bully Kutta (Note: This type is known by several other names, including the Indian bully, Indian mastiff, Pakistani bully, Pakistani mastiff, Indo-Pakistani mastiff, Indo-Pakistani bully, and Sindhi mastiff) is a type of large dog that originated in the Indian subcontinent, dating back to the 16th century. The Bully Kutta is a working dog used for hunting and guarding. The type is popular in the Punjab region of India and Pakistan, including Haryana and Delhi.

== Name and description ==
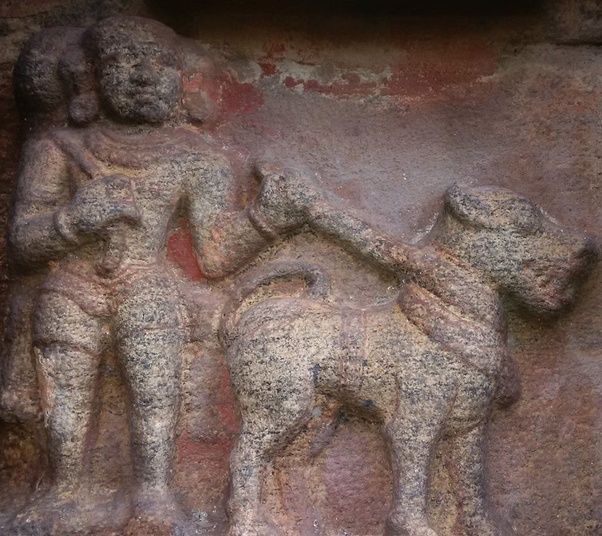
An ancient depiction of the Alangu Mastiff in the Darasuram Temple in the Thanjavur district of India

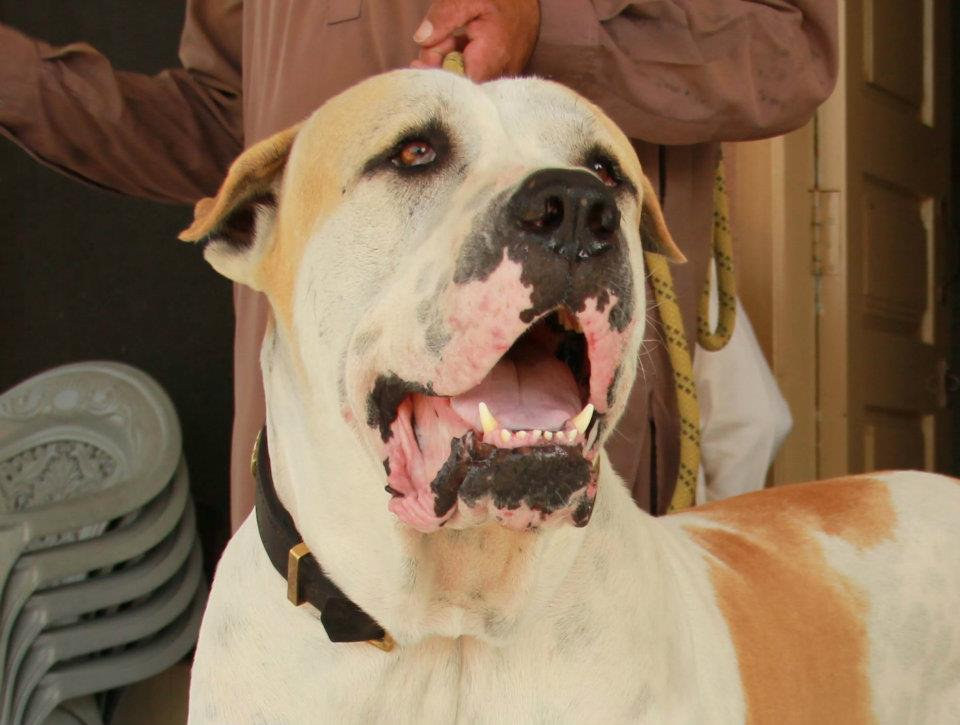
A Bully Kutta

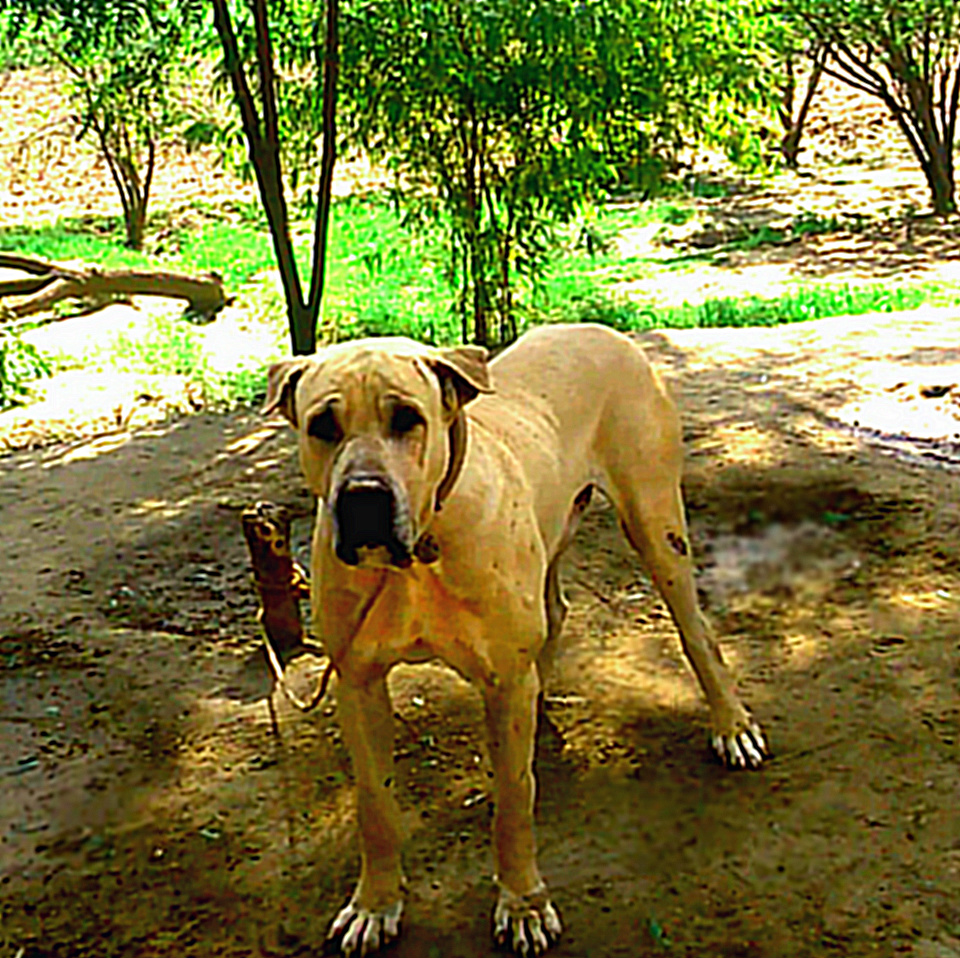
A Bully Kutta

Bully Kutta literally translates to "heavily wrinkled dog". The word "Bully" comes from the root word of the Hindustani and Punjabi language "Bohli" which means heavily wrinkled. "Bully" also is derived from Bull which means lips in Punjabi. This dog has big lips and hence Bully Kutta. "Kutta" means dog in the Punjabi language.

== History ==
The Bully Kutta originated in the Punjab and Sindh regions of Indian subcontinent. In Thanjavur, the Bully Kutta was a favorite pet of ruling families. The Mughal emperor Akbar owned a Bully Kutta, which he used for hunting.

The Second International Dog Show at Islington Agricultural Hall, held on 28 May 1864 in London, showcased the Indian Mastiff among several other dog breeds. The previous year, Edward, the Prince of Wales, and Princess Alexandra, entered an Indian Mastiff in the same show, along with a Newfoundland, Russian Tracker and two Borzois. In 1884, Littell's Living Age said that historically, a "large Indian mastiff" was employed by kings "in the chase of wild beasts".

== Temperament ==
Bully Kuttas have been described as intelligent, alert, responsive, energetic and aggressive. A well-known veterinarian Dr. L.N. Gupta from Agra, India has stated that Bully Kuttas are a dominating canine and should only be handled by well-experienced owners.

== Use as a fighting dog ==
Bully Kuttas have been illegally used for dog fighting in India and Pakistan, including areas such as Delhi, Gurugram, and Noida. In June 2018, police in Indian Punjab filed a First Information Report (FIR) for the first time against organizers of a dog fight. Many non-profit organizations are now working against illegal fighting and creating awareness among the people.

== Popularity ==
The Bully Kutta is popular in the Punjab region of India and Pakistan. In India, breeders from Punjab, Haryana, Rajasthan, Tamil Nadu, and Maharashtra focusing on scientific breeding of this dog under the guidelines of Indian Mastiff Registry. They have been part of many competitions in India. According to the Times of India, it has importance among Indian youth of having a macho image.

The Indian National Kennel Club, along with the Indian Mastiff Registry, recognizes this breed officially.

== See also ==
- List of dog breeds
- List of dog breeds from India
