= World Animal Protection =

International non-profit animal welfare organization

- Founded: 1981; 45 years ago
- Type: Non-governmental organization
- Purpose: Animal protection
- Location(s): Grays Inn Road, London, WC1
- Origins: WFPA and ISPA
- Region served: Worldwide
- Key people: Sarah Ireland, President; Tricia Croasdell, Chief Executive
- Website: worldanimalprotection.org

World Animal Protection, formerly the World Society for the Protection of Animals (WSPA), is an international non-profit animal welfare organization that has been in operation since 1981. The charity's mission is to create a better world for animals by protecting them.

The charity has regional hubs in: Africa, Asia, Europe, Latin America and North America, and offices in 14 countries. Its headquarters is in London.

== History ==
The organization was known previously as the World Society for the Protection of Animals (WSPA). This resulted from the merger of two animal welfare organizations in 1981, the World Federation for the Protection of Animals (WFPA) founded in 1950 and the International Society for the Protection of Animals (ISPA) founded in 1959. In June 2014, the charity became World Animal Protection.

== Campaigns ==
=== Animals in the wild ===
In 1985 WSPA launched a campaign to outlaw bullfighting in cities in France and Spain.

In the 1990s, the charity contributed to the prohibition of bear dancing in Greece, Turkey, and India. In India, the charity funded a sanctuary for bears previously used in the trade.

After a BBC investigation in September 2013, the charity launched a campaign against the caged civet coffee trade. Several retailers have since stopped selling coffee produced by caged civets.

The charity campaigns in Asia for an end to the bear bile industry. In Pakistan they work to end bear baiting by campaigning for a change in law, offering alternative livelihoods to bear owners and housing bears rescued from bear baiting in a purpose built sanctuary.

=== Animals in communities ===
The organization is working to end the inhumane culling of stray dogs, which many countries do in an effort to eliminate rabies. The organization believes that vaccination programs are the only effective way to eliminate rabies, and work with governments on vaccination programs. In 2012, a mass vaccination program was started in the Shaanxi, Guizhou and Anhui Provinces of China, working with the Chinese Animal Disease Control Centre; as of June 2014, 750 veterinarians have been trained and over 90,000 dogs have been vaccinated. Mass vaccination programs have also been delivered in Bali, the Philippines, Bangladesh, Kenya, Zanzibar, and Kathmandu, Nepal.

A second focus is on stray dog population management itself, through proven humane methods such as education, improved legislation, registration and identification of dogs, sterilisation and contraception, holding facilities and rehoming centres. They help governments design a program, and monitor and evaluate progress, using the model provided in the document "Humane Dog Population Management Guidance", developed in November 2007 by The International Companion Animal Management Coalition (ICAM Coalition), of which the organization is a member.

Programs often include veterinary services such as mobile clinics for stray cats and dogs or those belonging to people who cannot afford veterinary care. The animals are sterilized, vaccinated, and provided other needed veterinary care. Such programs are provided in Sri Lanka, Zanzibar, Colombia, Brazil, Costa Rica, Sierra Leone, and Bali.

A further focus is on helping working animals (horses, donkeys, and mules) in the West Bank, working with a partner organization, the Palestine Wildlife Society."

=== Animals in disasters ===
The charity has disaster operations teams in Asia and Latin America. In the aftermath of disasters they travel to worst affected areas to administer emergency veterinary care, distribute food and reunite animals with their owners where possible. The work is of particular benefit in developing world countries, where communities rely on animals for food, transport and income. The charity also works with governments and local animal welfare groups in disaster-prone areas to set up national warning systems and teach communities how to protect their animals in the event of a disaster.

In November 2013 the charity were filmed for a BBC documentary called Vets in the Disaster Zone, during disaster response work in the Philippines after Typhoon Haiyan. The programme aired on BBC Two on 28 April 2014.

=== Animals in farming ===
World Animal Protection works with governments, food businesses and farmers to improve the welfare of farmed animals. They encourage the general public to buy food produced in line with high welfare standards.

In 2013 the charity joined with Compassion in World Farming to create a business benchmark on farm animal welfare (BBFAW). According to The Guardian, there has been a 10 per cent rise in companies publishing farm animal welfare policies since the benchmark launched.

In 2024, World Animal Protection published a report "Your Taxes, Their Farms: Funding Factory Farming Abroad". It found that more than £116 million of UK's Taxpayer money has been used to fund "cruel and damaging" factory farms abroad in the past five years.

=== Global animal welfare ===
The charity is campaigning for a universal declaration on animal welfare. In 2013 they successfully lobbied the United Nations to include language on animal welfare in two General Assembly Resolutions on agriculture and disaster risk reduction. In 2017, a World Animal Protection investigation uncovered a massive increase in harmful wildlife selfies on social media sites. Instagram vowed to take action, following an investigation by international NGO, World Animal Protection. In 2017, two Instagram personalities, Sal Lavallo and Jessica Nabongo streamed a live video of an endangered species, a pangolin being eaten in Gabon. As of 2020, videos and accounts showing cruelty to animals and abuses of endangered species are not banned.

=== Jeannette McDermott Award ===
In 2015 World Animal Protection awarded Marcelle Meredith, Executive Director of the National Council of Societies for the Prevention of Cruelty to Animals - South Africa (NSPCA), and former Board member of the World Animal Protection, with the Jeannette McDermott award for animal welfare. The award was created in Canada by World Animal Protection in 1996 "in recognition of someone’s life devoted to animal welfare." Dominique Bellemare, Chairman of WAP Canada stated: "Marcelle has done amazing work for the past decade and for the cause of animal welfare. She has used her years on the international platform to advance the cause of animal welfare in Africa. I thank her profusely for all her work and dedication."

== See also ==
- Animal protectionism
- Animal welfare
- Animal welfare in the United Kingdom
- World Wild Fund for Nature
