= Broholmer =

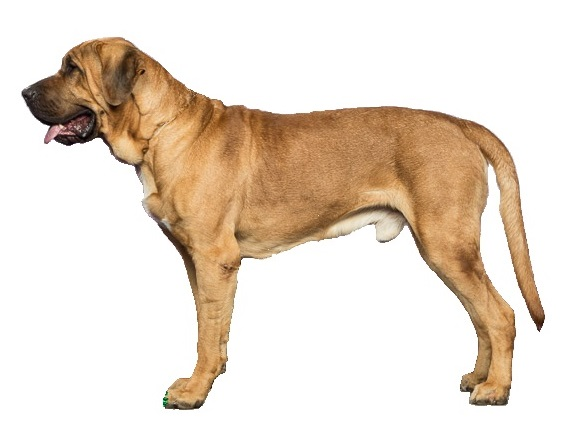
- A male Broholmer
- Other names: Danish Broholmer; Danish Mastiff
- Origin: Denmark
Traits
Height	Males	75 cm (30 in)
	Females	70 cm (28 in)
Weight	Males	50–70 kg (110–150 lb)
	Females	40–60 kg (88–132 lb)
- Coat: Short with thick undercoat
- Color: Yellow with black mask; golden red; black
Kennel club standards
- Dansk Kennel Club: standard
- Fédération Cynologique Internationale: standard

The Broholmer, also called the Danish Mastiff, is a large mastiff breed of dog from Denmark, recognized by the Danish Kennel Club and the Fédération Cynologique Internationale. It has been employed as a guard dog in the homes of the wealthy. The breed's numbers dwindled severely during World War II, but the dog made a successful return in the 1970s.

== Description ==
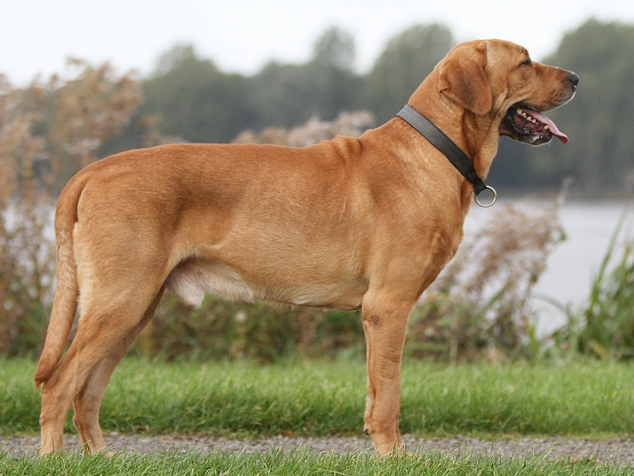

The Danish Broholmer is a dog that strongly resembles a Mastiff. It is large and powerful, with a loud, impressive bark and dominant walk. A well trained Broholmer should be calm, good tempered, and friendly, yet watchful towards strangers. Females stand about 27.5 inches (70 cm) and weigh in at 90–130 pounds (41–59 kg). Males stand about 29.5 inches (75 cm) and weigh in at 110–150 pounds (50–68 kg). The body is built square and rectangular with a large and massive head. The width and length of the skull and the length of the nose should be of equal length. The head is generally not carried very high. The coat is short and harsh, and the color can be light or brownish yellow, or black. Some white markings on the coat are permitted, and a black mask may be found. The average life span is around 7–12 years.

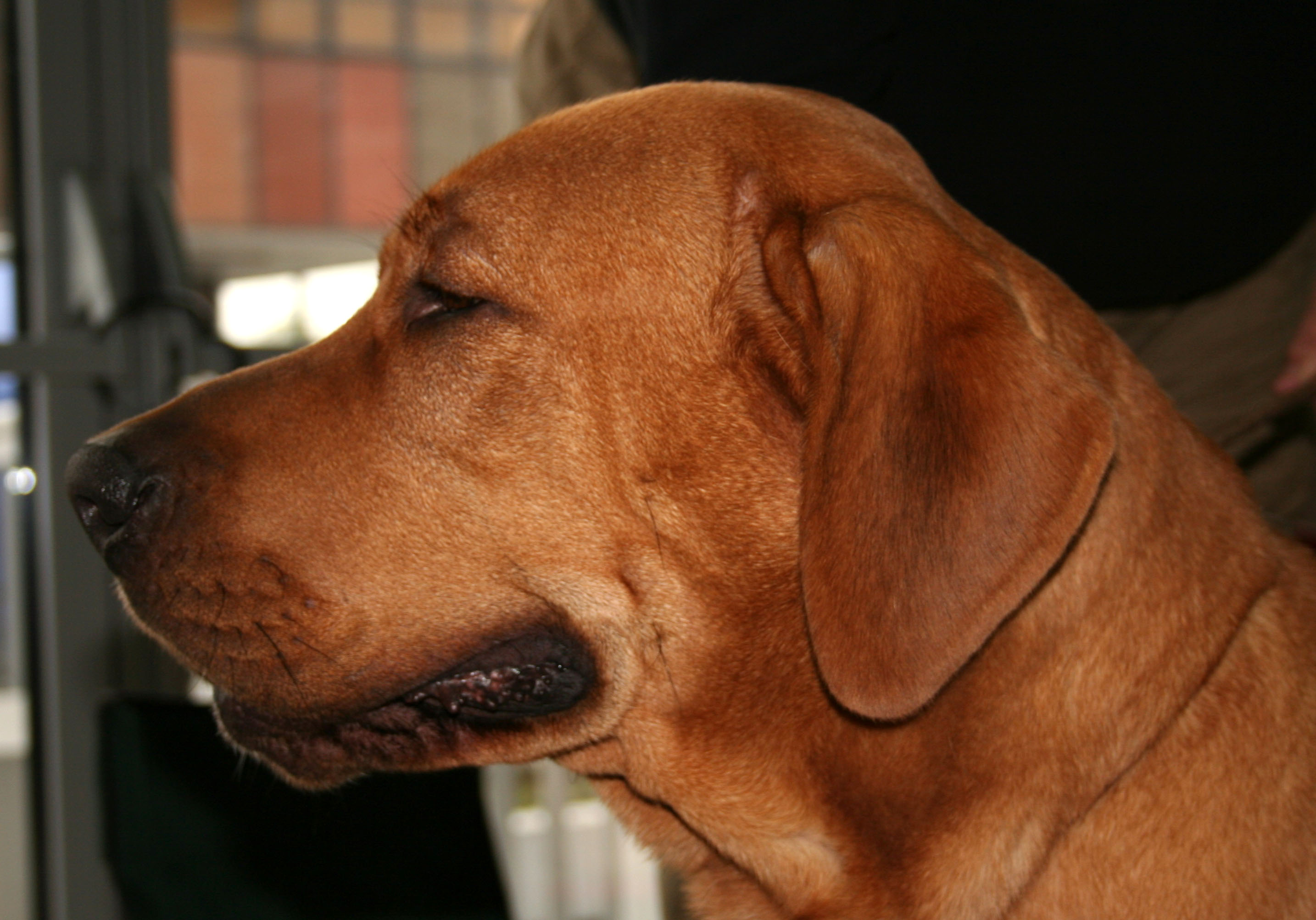
Head study of a Broholmer

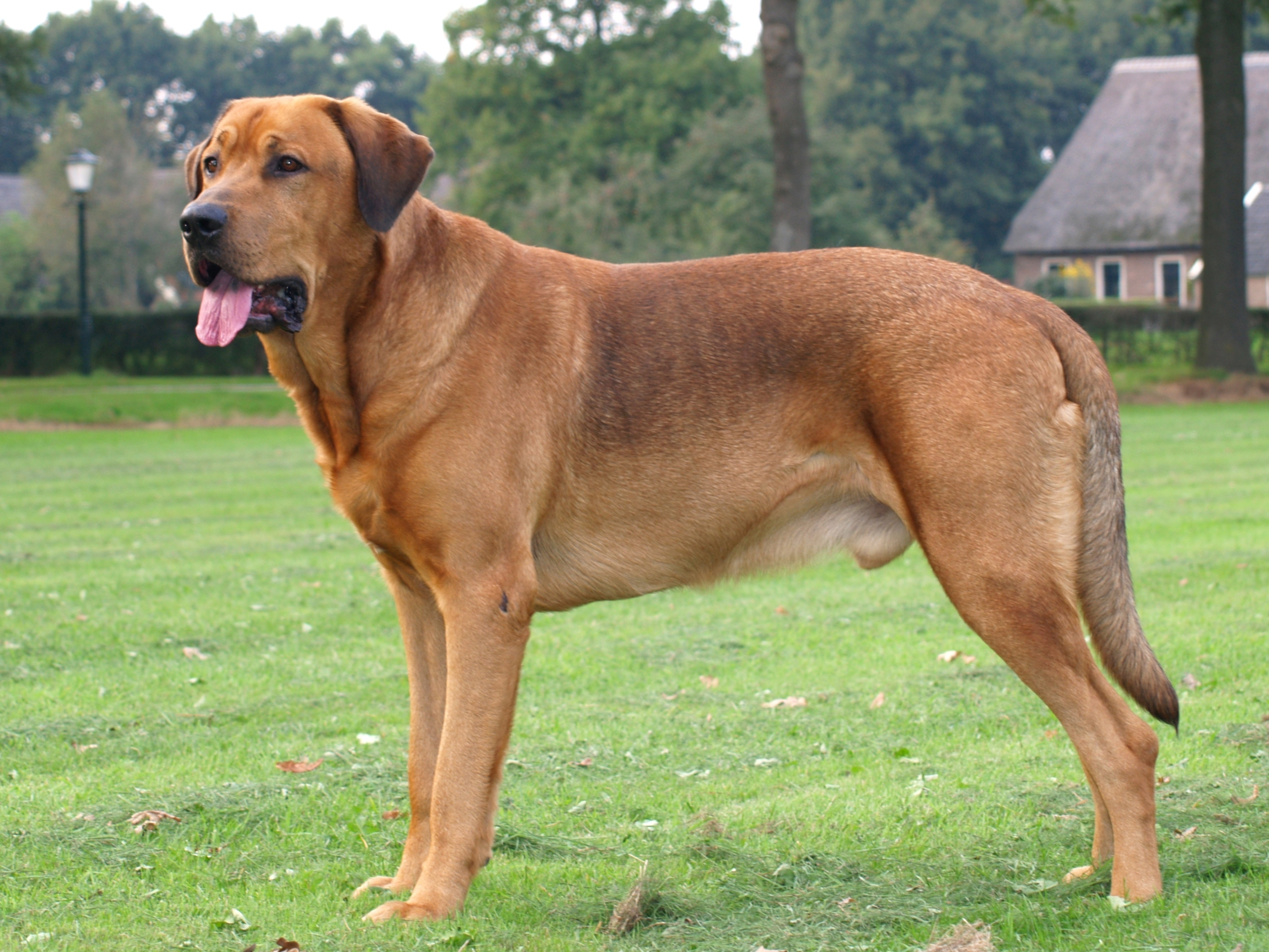
Male Broholmer

== Degenerative myelopathy ==
The breed was imported to the UK in 2009 with a view to being put on the UK kennel clubs import list. It was discovered in the recent years (2016) that the Broholmers that were imported into the United States were all afflicted with degenerative myelopathy (DM), a spontaneously occurring, adult-onset spinal cord disorder that affects dogs, and is similar to amyotrophic lateral sclerosis (ALS) or Lou Gehrig's disease in humans (1). With DM, there is degeneration of the “white matter” of the spinal cord and the peripheral nerves. The white matter tracts of the spinal cord contain fibers that transmit movement commands from the brain to the limbs and sensory information from the limbs to the brain. The first Broholmer ever to be imported into the United States with the intent to breed it, died in 2018 due to DM, and all other dogs imported have DM as well. These dogs were never presented and therefore never accepted by Broholmer Selskabet, the Danish main organization for the protection and the breeding of healthy Broholmers. One completely healthy male Broholmer, Bodholdts Bedste Bergthor, approved for breeding by the Broholmer Selskab, was imported into the US in 2010. He was, however, never bred in the US.

== See also ==
- List of dog breeds
