= List of dog breeds from India =

This is a list of dog breeds from India.

== Breeds ==
Name	Other Names	Recognition	Notes	Image
Bakharwal		NONE	a livestock guardian dog from northern India.	Bakarwal
Banjara Hound		NONE	the sighthound used by the Banjara people.	Banjara_from_1915
Bully Kutta		NONE	an Indian mastiff used for hunting and guarding	Bully_Kutta_Male
Chippiparai		KCI	a sighthound from Tamil Nadu.	Nipper;_12_months_old_male_Chippiparai_dog_5
Gull Dong		NONE	a fighting dog, guard dog, and hunting dog found in India and Pakistan.	
Gull Terrier		NONE	a rare fighting dog, guard dog, and hunting dog found in India and Pakistan.	GULL_TERR_(PAKISTANI_BULL_TERRIER)
Haofa Tangkhul Hui		NONE	a hunting dog used by the Tangkhul people	
Himalayan Sheepdog	Gaddi Kutta; Himalayan Mastiff	NONE	a livestock guardian dog from the Himalayas of India and Nepal	2._Himalayan_sheep_dog
Indian Spitz		NONE	a small farm dog found in India	Indian_Spitz_Dog
Indian pariah dog	Indian native dog; INDogNadan; South Asian pye dog; Desi Kutta; Neri Kutta	NONE	pariah dog found throughout India.	The_Indian_Pariah_Dog
Jonangi	Jonangi Jagilam; Kolleti Jagilam	NONE	a fighting dog, guard dog, and hunting dog from southern India.	Jonangi
Kaikadi		NONE	a sighthound kept by the Kaikadi people	
Kanni		KCI	a rare sighthound found in the state of Tamil Nadu.	Semi_Dropping_Ear_Kanni
Kombai	Polygar	KCI	a sighthound and guard dog from southern India.	The_Combai_Breed_4
Mahratta Greyhound	Mahratta Hound	NONE	a sighthound from Maharashtra.	Mahratta_Hound
Mudhol Hound		KCI	– a sighthound popular in central India.	Caravan_hound_Dolly1
Rajapalayam	Polygar Hound; Indian Ghost Hound	KCI	a southern Indian sighthound.	The_Rajapalayam_Breed
Ramanadhapuram Mandai		KCI	a guard dog and hound from Tamil Nadu.	Ramanadhapuram_Dog
Rampur Greyhound		NONE	a sighthound from the Rampur district	Rampurgreyhound
Vikhan		NONE	a livestock guardian dog from India and Pakistan.	

== See also ==
- List of dog breeds
