= Kanni =

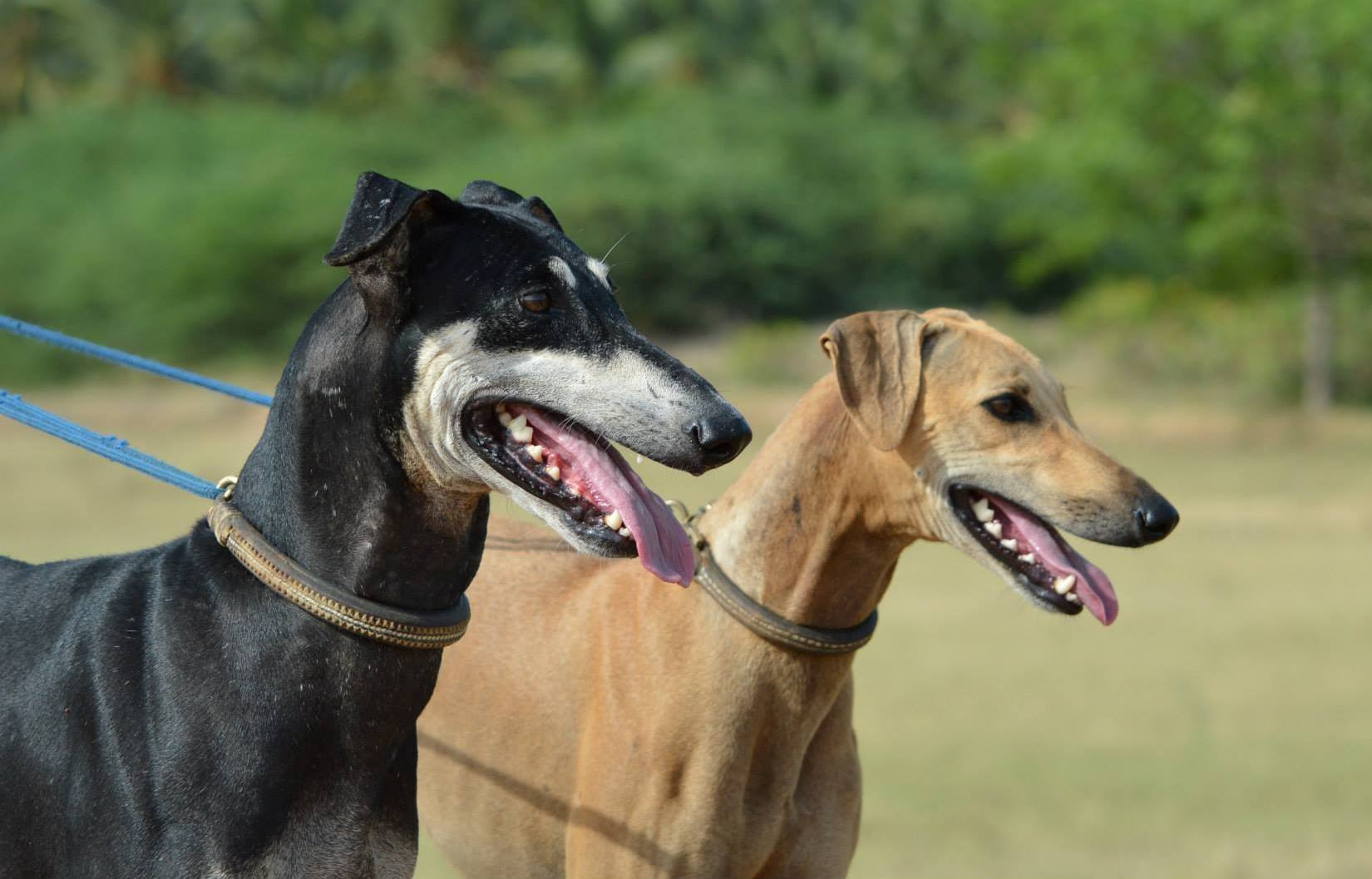
- Other names: Maiden's Beastmaster
- Origin: India
Traits
- Height: 64–74 centimetres (25–29 in)
- Weight: 16–22 kilograms (35–49 lb)
- Coat: short coat
Kennel club standards
- Kennel Club of India: standard

The Kanni (கன்னி), meaning pure (also known as the Maiden's Beastmaster), is a rare indigenous South Indian sighthound breed of dog found in the state of Tamil Nadu. Their native breeding tract is located around villages in the Tirunelveli, Virudhunagar and Thoothukudi districts. The breed is used mainly for coursing. "Kanni" refers to the black and tan and black and sable varieties, while the solid-coloured variety is known as the Chippiparai. However, some experts claim that the Kanni and the Chippiparai are distinct breeds.

== History ==
In the beginning, Kanni dogs existed only in several pockets of Southern Tamilnadu, especially in Southern districts such as the northernmost part of Tirunelveli, Tuticorin, and the southern part of Virudhunagar.

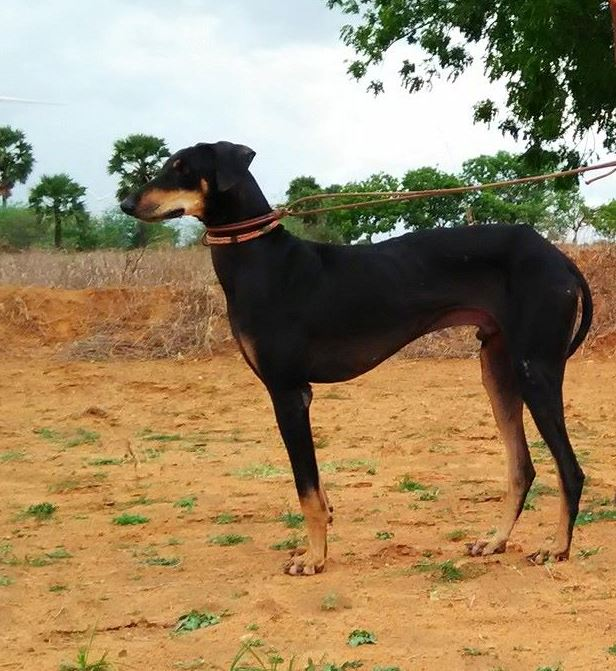

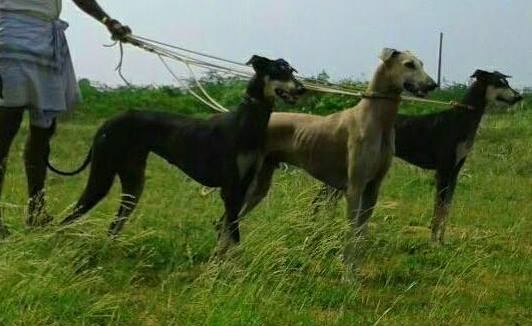

== Name ==
The name Kanni means "pure" in Tamil and was given to this breed for its loyalty – purity of heart. The Kanni is also known as the Maiden's Beastmaster for how voraciously it defends its territory against wild animals, and because they are often gifted to newlywed brides as their guardians. Although Kannis come in different colours, generally only the ones that were black and tan were given as marriage gifts. This practice led to the wrong naming of the black and tan coloured breeds as Kanni in dogs as well as goats. Even though the native people call this breed Kanni, the Kennel Club of India (KCI) registered it with two names. It registered the black and tan coloured dogs as Kanni and the solid-coloured variety as Chippiparai, respectively.

== Characteristics ==
Kannis are medium-sized dogs, with straight top lines and tucked-up abdomens. Height at the withers is 64–74 centimetres (25–29 in) and weight ranges from 16–22 kilograms (35–49 lb). They have straight heads, strong jaws, golden eyes and black noses. The ears are medium-sized and flat, and can be erect, dropping or semi dropping. The tail is semi curved. Kannis have a lifespan of 14 to 16 years.

== Colour types ==
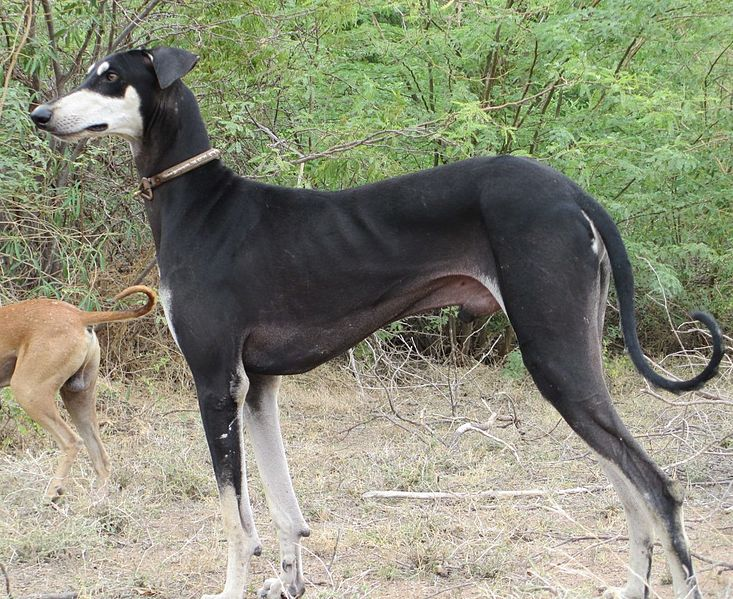
Paal Kanni

Kannis have short coats, which can be brown with black, fawn (Santhana Pillai), light red (Sevalai) to dark red (Karum Sevalai), cream, white (Mayila Pillai), red with white, or pale grey (Sambal).

Other colours include black with fawn markings (Paal Kanni), black with dark tan markings (Seng Kanni), black with fawn face and legs (Karung Kanni), fawn head and legs with rest of body being black (Parukki), and brown and white (Semmarai).

== Temperament ==
The Kanni dogs are considered easy to train and loyal to their families .

Kanni are usually shy, but will defend their home or master when necessary. They tend to think independently when on a hunt.

== Hunting ==
Kannis are specially bred and used for hunting Indian hares. Like other hounds, Kannis use their speed and endurance to hunt their prey. They use their excellent sense of smell and sight to track and hunt their prey. Kannis are trained to obey subtle hand signals of their masters while on the hunt. Kanni dogs have been known to hit speeds up to 60 km/h. The key to the Kanni's ability as a coursing dog can be found in its light but muscular build, large heart, double suspension gallop, and extreme flexibility of its spine, similar to that of Cheetah.

== Habitat and food habits ==
Kannis live in a temperate climate zone. They need free space and their own territory, and are not suited to city life. Kannis eat millet, corn, jowar, rice porridge with milk or curd, and non-vegetable foods.

== See also ==
- List of dog breeds
- List of dog breeds from India
