= Bakharwal dog =

Dogbreed in Jammu and Kashmir, India

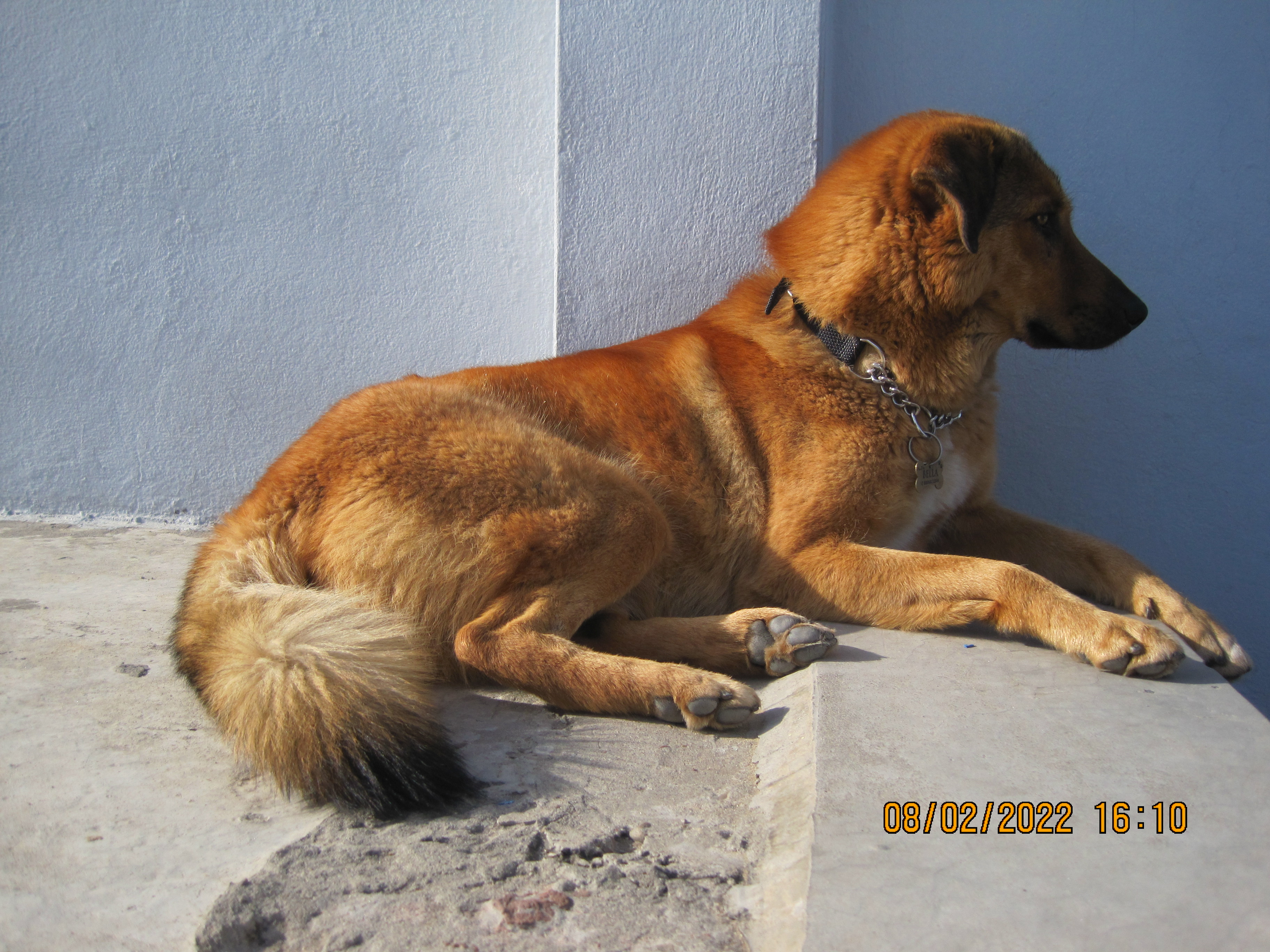
- Female Bakharwal
- Other names: Bakherwal, Bakhrawal Mastiff, Kashmiri Sheepdog, Kashmiri Bakerwal Dog, Kashmiri Mastiff
- Origin: Indian subcontinent
- Breed status: Not recognised as a breed by any major kennel club.
Traits
Height	Males	61–76 cm (24–30 in)
	Females	61–76 cm (24–30 in)
- Weight: 70–90 kg (150–200 lb)
- Coat: Double coat
- Colour: Black and tan, piebald, tri-colour
- Litter size: 1–3

The Bakharwal dog is a livestock guardian dog found in northern India. It is an ancient working Indian dog breed found in Ladakh and across the Pir Panjal Range of Jammu and Kashmir, India.

It has been bred by the Gaddis, Jats, Gujjar and Bakerwal castes, as well as other local people of Jammu and Kashmir and Himachal Pradesh, for the purpose of guarding their flocks of goats, sheep and cattle, along with their houses, from centuries.

While the Bakharwal Dog is mainly found in Jammu and Kashmir region, India. A recent study says that this breed is on the verge of extinction and has appealed to include this animal in the endangered species category by local communities. Of late, there were many cases when this mountain breed of dog contracted rabies or was shot by separatist militants.

== History ==
The origin of the Bakharwal Dog lies in Ladakh, northern India, and found in the states of Jammu and Kashmir and Himachal Pradesh.

The Bakharwal Dog may be descended from crossbreeding the Tibetan Mastiff with the Indian pariah dog, though other scholars state that the Bakharwal Dog is the "oldest Indian Dog which since centuries has been surviving with the Kashmiri nomads."

The Bakharwal Dog has been targeted by separatist militants in the erstwhile Indian state of Jammu and Kashmir, who shot the dogs to prevent them from alerting people of their intrusion.

These separatist militants prevented herdsmen from going to higher reaches, which caused many Bakharwal Dogs to catch disease and die.

== General appearance ==
Bakarwal is divided into two categories, general Bakarwal and Ladakhi Bakarwal. Bakarwal is a powerful, heavy bone, medium to large size dog. It is an agile and a sturdy breed, a typical mountain dog with a furry coat and plumy tail that gives it a majestic look. It looks like a medium version of Tibetan Mastiff.

It is mostly black, with white fur at the toes and chest. The dog has a vegetarian appetite that mainly includes bread made of rice chaff, maize and milk. Common colours are black and tan, red, fawn, pied, sable, white and brindle.

Females of the particular breed give birth to a single litter once a year, with the average size being three to four puppies.

== Utilisation ==
The Bakharwal Dog, along with the Gaddi Kutta, is particularly used for guarding sheep, protecting farms and homes in Himachal Pradesh as well as in Jammu and Kashmir. It is also used by the Indian Police in order to capture militants across the nation.

Bakharwal Dogs, the mountain dogs are an ancient breed of working dogs found in the state of Jammu and Kashmir. Scientists believe that these may be amongst the oldest herding dogs having origins in Central Asia. They are bred by nomadic tribes as a livestock guardian dog and settlement protector.

== See also ==
- List of dog breeds
- List of dog breeds from India
