= Mahratta Hound =

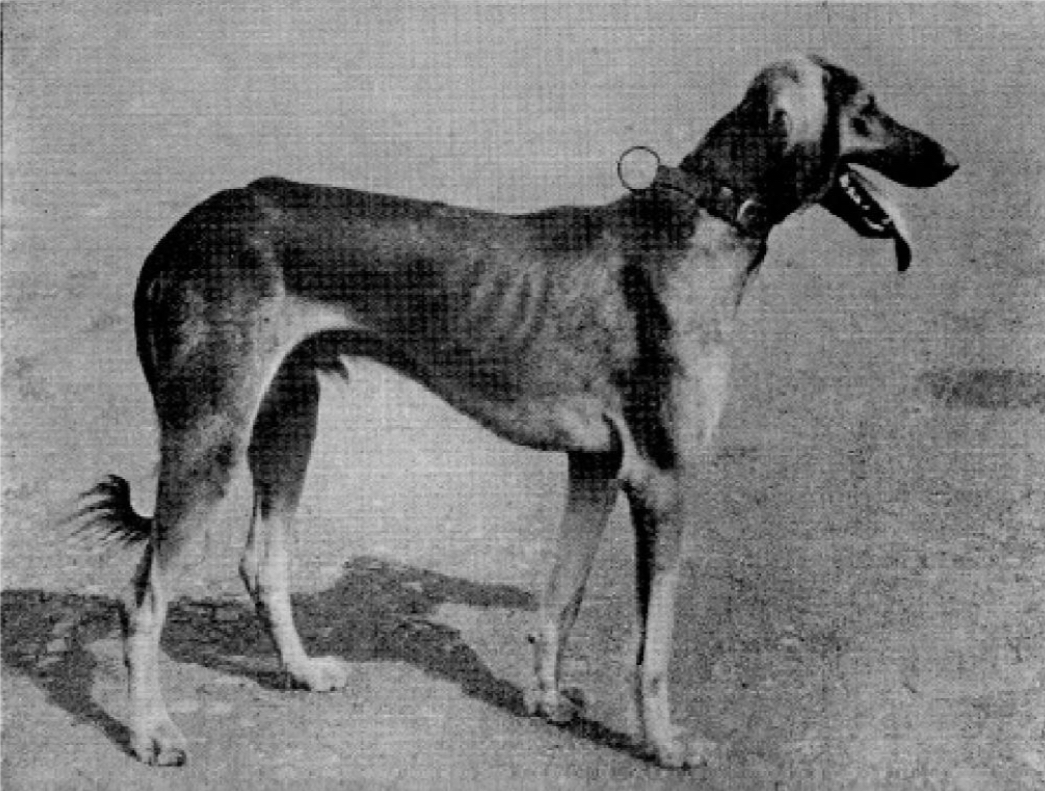
- Other names: Mahratta Greyhound
- Origin: India
- Breed status: Not recognised as a breed by any major kennel club.
Traits
- Height: 22 in (56 cm)

The Mahratta Hound, sometimes called the Mahratta Greyhound, is a breed of dog found in India. It is a sighthound, and like the Banjara Hound it is bred and used for hunting by the nomadic Banjara of Maharashtra. The Mahratta Hound is believed to be of Arabian or Persian heritage, is often blue and tan in colour and stands around 22 inches (56 cm). It is prized for its prowess in hunting panther and boar, both very formidable prey for a hound, as well as blackbuck.

== See also ==
- List of dog breeds
- List of dog breeds from India
