= Rajapalayam dog =

Rajapalayam Hound
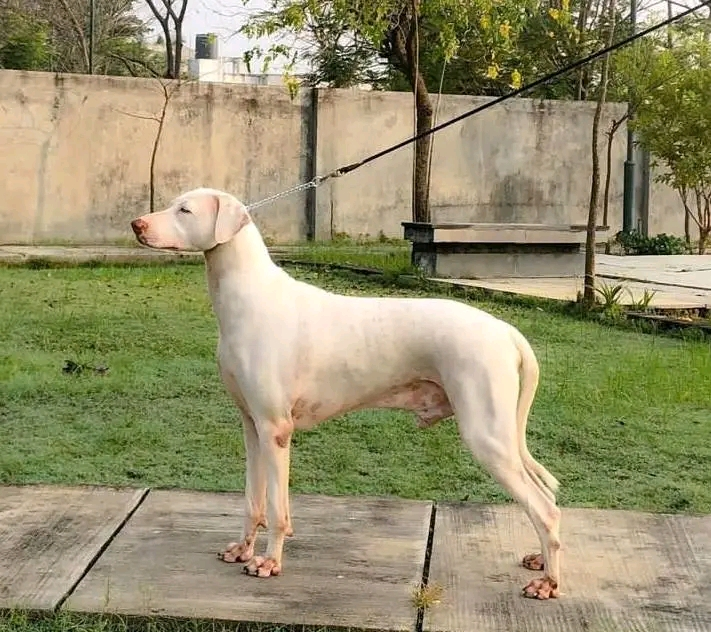
- Origin: India
Traits
- Height: 24 to 28 inch
- Weight: 20 to 30 kg
- Coat: Single short coat
- Colour: White

The Rajapalayam Hound, also known as the Polygar Hound or Indian Ghost Hound, or simply Rajapalayam, is an Indian dog breed. The sighthound is named after the town of Rajapalayam in southern Tamil Nadu.

== Origin and distribution ==
Rajapalayam Hound is believed to have been first raised as a guard dog during the rule of the Nayaka dynasties in southern Tamil Nadu. The breed is named after the town of Rajapalayam. Historical records indicate that the dogs were used in the Carnatic and Polygar Wars in the 18th century. They have also been used used by the Indian Army. In 1980, a dog breeding unit was established at Chennai, which reared native breeds including Rajapalayam.

== Appearance and characteristics ==
Rajapalayam Hound is a hunting dog and a sighthound. It is also known as the Polygar Hound and Indian Ghost Hound. It is a medium to large dog, measuring about 24 to 28 in (610 to 710 mm) in height and weighs 20 to 30 kg (44 to 66 lb). It has a short white coat. It has a muscular wide chest with a slender abdomen, a slightly arched back, and a long tapering tail. It has long and slender legs. The face is broad with yellow eyes and a light reddish coloured nose. It has a lifespan of about 10 to 15 years.

While the breed is known for its obedience to humans, they need to be trained to acclamatise with humans. Once trained, they are loyal to and possessive of their handlers. They also require regular physical work and exercise. They can tolerate the heat and humid conditions of the tropics. The dog breeds throughout the year, and produces a litter of one to eight puppies. They are generally not suitable for crossbreeding.

== Popular culture ==
India Post released a postage stamp featuring the breed in 2005.

== See also ==
- Chippiparai
- Pampas Deerhound
- Ramanadhapuram Mandai
