= Kaikadi dog =

Kaikadi
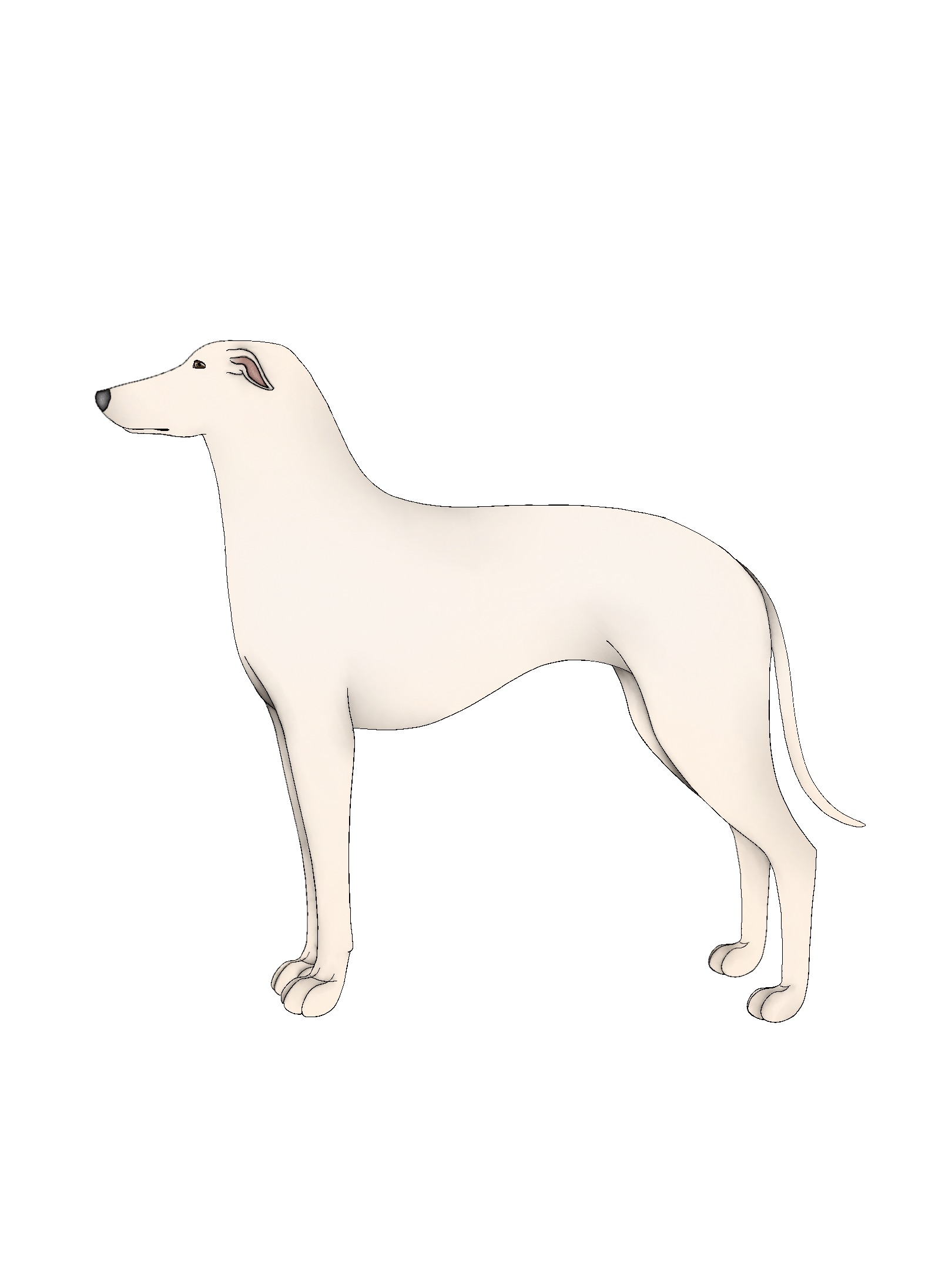
- a drawing of the Kaikadi
- Origin: India
- Breed status: Not recognised as a breed by any major kennel club.
Traits
- Height: 38–46 cm (15–18 in)
- Weight: ≈ 20 kg (44 lb)
- Colour: Predominantly white, tan or black

The Kaikadi is a breed of sighthound from India. The Kaikadi are kept by the Kaikadi people, a nomadic tribe in Maharashtra and parts of Gujarat. They are a particularly small and thin breed of sighthound standing between 38 and 46 centimetres (15 and 18 in) and weighing around 20 kilograms (44 lb). They have long, thin legs and powerful thighs and hock joints, a long tapered tail, a long, thin head with prominent eyes, and erect ears. Their short coat comes in a variety of colours, but white, tan and black are predominant.

The Kaikadi are known for their exceptional speed. They usually hunt in packs for a variety of small game, particularly monkeys, rats, monitor lizards, mongoose and squirrels. The breed is suspicious of strangers, and at night they work as watchdogs for their masters.

== See also ==
- List of dog breeds
- List of dog breeds from India
