= KCI =

KCI may refer to:

- Key Club International
- Kitchener-Waterloo Collegiate and Vocational School
- Kansas City International Airport
- Korea Citation Index
- Cedric "K-Ci" Hailey
- Kinetic Concepts Inc
- Kennel Club of India
- Kereta Commuter Indonesia, Indonesian commuter railway operator

== See also ==
- Potassium Chloride (KCl, with a lowercase "l")
