= Indian National Kennel Club =

Indian registry of purebred dogs

- Formation: March 21, 1957; 69 years ago
- Type: Kennel Club
- Headquarters: Mumbai, India
- President: Mr. Phiroze B. Javeri
- Key people: Mrs. Ratty P. Javeri; Secretary and Founder Member; Mr. Rustam Kumana; Vice President; Mr. Chetan Vengurlekar; Joint Secretary
- Website: www.inkc.in

The Indian National Kennel Club is a registry of purebred dogs in India. Beyond maintaining its pedigree registry, this kennel club also promotes and sanctions events for purebred dogs, including dog shows and specialty shows.

== History ==
The Indian National Kennel Club was established on 21 March 1957 to promote the love of dogs, and enable proper breeding, rearing and training of dogs.

== Current activity and administration ==
The Indian National Kennel Club is the leading authority on registration of purebreds and maintains the recognized registry. It issues pedigrees for purebreds and litters. It hosts various seminars, workshops, training classes and annual shows across the country, and awards championships to various breeds of dogs.

The current president of the Indian National Kennel Club is Mr. Phiroze Javeri. Mrs. Ratty P. Javeri is the secretary and a founder member of the organization.

According to an Instagram post, Mr. Rustam Kumana was installed as the Vice President and Mr. Chetan Vengurlekar as the Joint Secretary of the club in August 2023.

== Registration ==
The Indian National Kennel Club registers litters of puppies whose sire and dam have both been registered with either the Indian National Kennel Club or the Kennel Club of India, as well as dogs imported from other countries. It also registers purebred dogs whose parents do not have documentation; these dogs are classified as “purebreds with unknown pedigree”.

Since its establishment in 1957, the Indian National Kennel Club processed registrations through handwritten forms and manual record keeping. Mechanical typewriters were introduced in the 1960s, followed by digital typewriters in the 1970s. During this period, the turnaround time for issuing pedigree certificates generally extended to about one month due to the manual verification required.

INKC adopted computer based record keeping in 1991 through a dedicated registration program. This transition reduced the processing time for certificates to roughly three weeks and placed INKC among the earliest kennel clubs to issue digitally generated pedigree documents.

Public facing digital access expanded in stages. Portions of the registration system were opened to dog owners in 2013, allowing limited online viewing of records and enabling online payments through the INKC website. Certificate turnaround times during this phase averaged about two weeks as more workflow components moved into the digital environment.

On January 9, 2023 INKC introduced full online access for dog owners, providing complete digital profiles for registered dogs along with account and ownership information. In April 2023, the organization adopted the Totally Online Process (TOP), shifting all dog and litter registrations, transfers of ownership, dog show entries and result certificates to a fully electronic platform accessible through its website (inkc.in) and its Android application, DoggyLocker. INKC is regarded as one of the first kennel clubs in the world to provide a completely paperless registration workflow. Following the introduction of TOP, certificate issuance times reduced dramatically, with documents typically generated within a range of two minutes to two hours depending on the complexity of verification.

Pedigree papers issued by the Indian National Kennel Club are continuously updated as registered dogs earn titles or change ownership. These documents help maintain lineage integrity and reduce the circulation of peddling pedigrees of pedigreed dogs at bay.

The most common registered breeds with the Indian National Kennel Club are: Labrador Retrievers, Golden Retrievers, German Shepherds, dachshunds, Doberman Pinschers and pugs. Along with the common breeds, Indian National Kennel Club also registers Indian pure breeds like the Mudhol Hound.

== Dog shows ==
Speciality and general dog shows are conducted by the Indian National Kennel Club all over the country. These shows are generally held from October to May every year. The shows follow procedures and guidelines set by the Indian National Kennel Club.

Dogs are issued challenge certificates and championship certificates. Dogs are awarded points (depending on their breed and temperament) in every dog show and at the end of the year, the dog receiving the most show points receives the Dog of the Year award.

The other awards include Best in Class, Best of Breed, Best in Group, Best in Show.

The Indian National Kennel Club organizes an event in the Prakruti festival in Bhavan's College, Andheri, Mumbai every year on animal petting and dog shows.

== Specialty dog shows ==
In addition to general dog shows, the Indian National Kennel Club also organizes specialty dog shows. For fun and interaction between dogs and humans, Indian National Kennel Club also holds events like fancy dress for dogs. They also arrange doggie dates for dogs which helps the owner to find a suitable mate for their dog.
