= Kombai dog =

Kombai
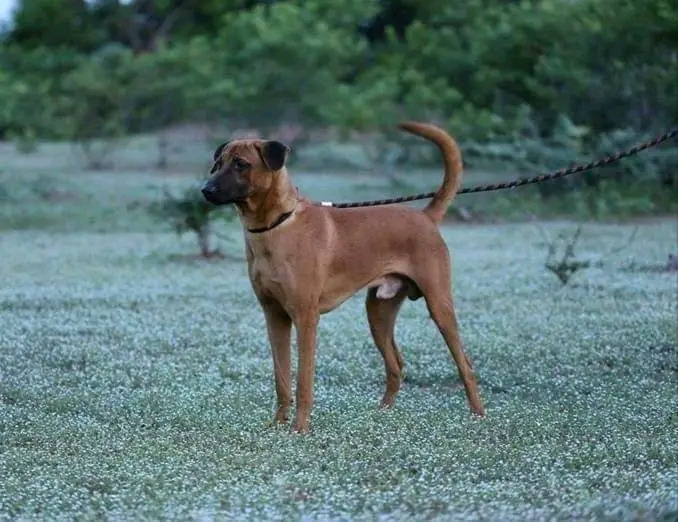
- Kombai male
- Origin: Tamil Nadu, India
Traits
- Height: ≈ 58 cm (23 in)
	Males	56–62 cm (22–24 in)
	Females	51–58 cm (20–23 in)
Weight	Males	25–35 kg (55–77 lb)
	Females	23–32 kg (51–71 lb)
- Coat: double coat both are short
- Colour: dark red and Tan with black mask face
- Litter size: 4 - 8
Kennel club standards
- Kennel Club of India: standard

The Kombai or Polygar dog is a breed of working dog native to Tamil Nadu in Southern India. Traditionally kept for guarding and protection, they have a reputation for making excellent guard dogs. They were also occasionally used for hunting big game. The Kombai is an extremely rare and prized breed, and efforts are underway to increase the population of this breed. These efforts are showing signs of success, because of the various Kombai breeders along southern India who have helped to preserve this breed.

== Description ==
The Kombai is described as a broad, short, muscular, powerful and athletic dog that stands around 58 centimetres (23 in). They have a short, smooth coat that is usually light brown to dark red in colour. They have dark eyes, the mid-length ears with bent tips(With the ears, in some individuals, being completely black), and a characteristic fine, black, mask-like muzzle. The breed has a broad, slightly haired tail that is carried over their back resembling a sickle.

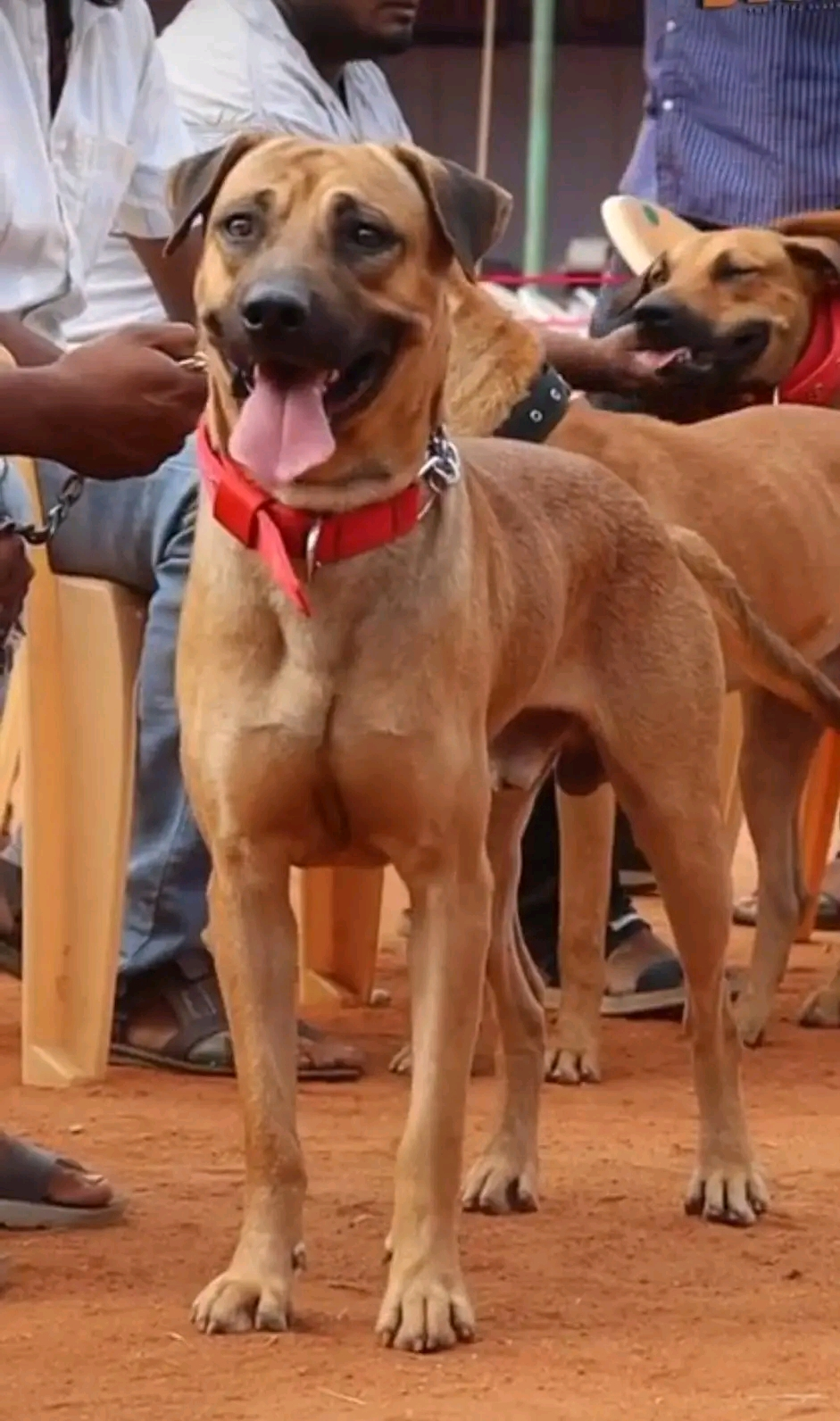

The Kombai is traditionally described described as a loyal and protective breed that forms strong bonds with familiar people. It is generally tolerant of children within its household, while its reserved and territorial nature towards unfamiliar people and dogs has historically made it suitable for use as a guard dogs.

== History ==
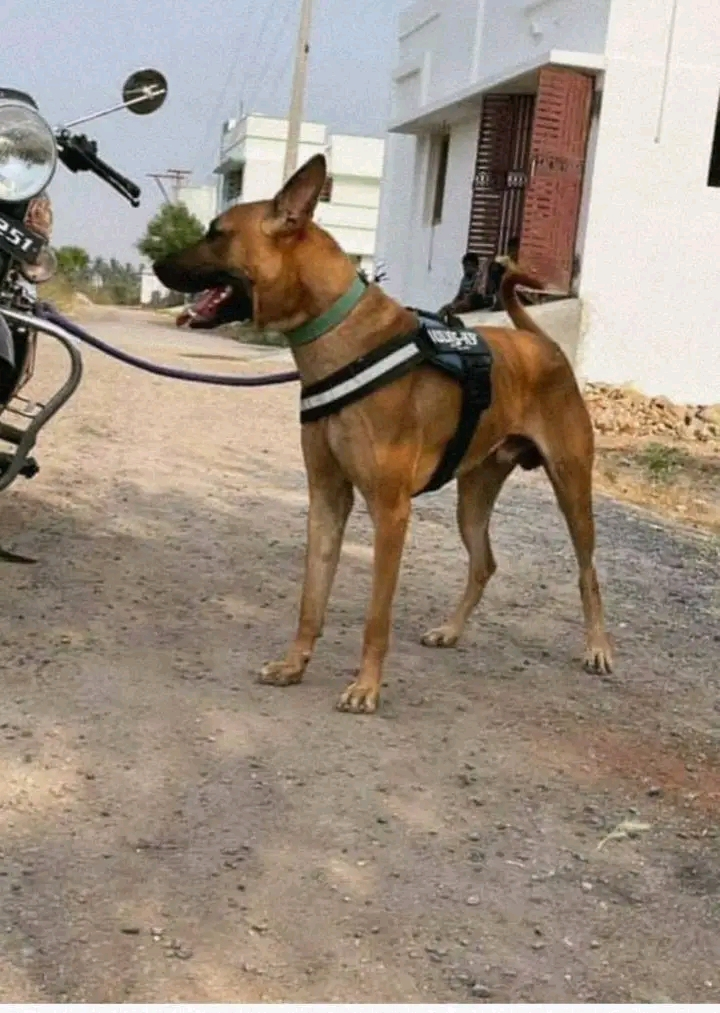
Kombai dog

The breed originated in the Theni district and is named after the town of Kombai. It subsequently spread throughout Southern India. The Kombai was traditionally kept by zamindars and others for coursing a variety of game. When hunting it is particularly robust and athletic, easily clearing hedges and other obstacles. They are also called polygar dogs.

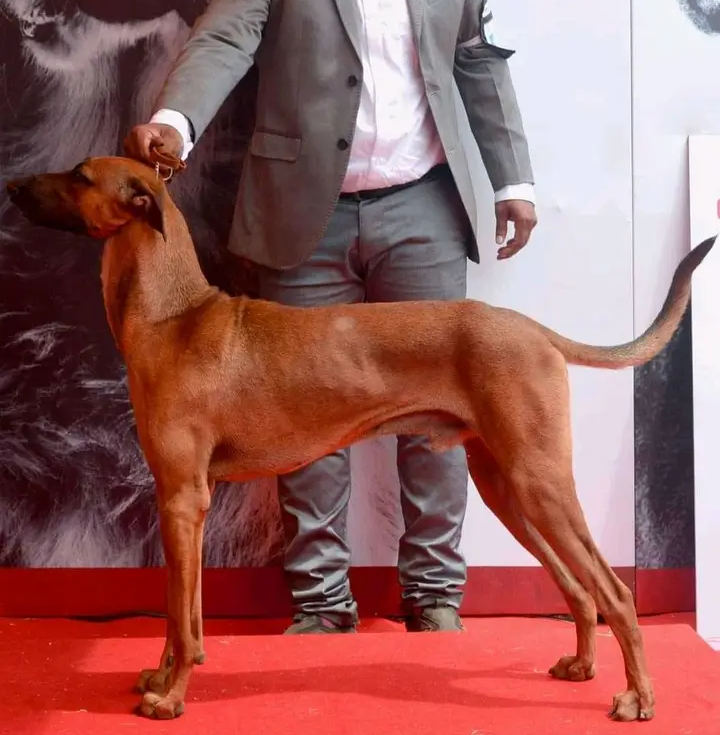

The Kannada Vokkaliga zamindars of Kombai presented Tipu Sultan and Hyder Ali with these dogs for their army. The ferocious dogs were trained to rip the hamstrings of enemy horses. Tipu sent the town an idol of Ranganathaswamy in gratitude. It is said that the Kombai polygars valued the dog so highly that in olden days they were ready to exchange a horse for one.

There are conflicting reports about the status of the breed; some reports from the 1960s stated the dog was popular and numbers were increasing, whilst others from the same period described them as practically extinct. A Tamil Nadu state-run dog-breeding facility did take up the cause of breeding the Kombai, along with a number of other local breeds. However, it was reported they suspended their Kombai breeding program when owners who had purchased dogs returned them, finding their character ill-suited to keeping as pets.The Kombai dog was recently featured in the malayalam movie 𝘌𝘬𝘰.

== See also ==
- List of dog breeds
- List of dog breeds from India
