= Vikhan =

- Origin: Pakistan, India
- Breed status: Not recognised as a breed by any major kennel club.
Traits
- Coat: Long
- Colour: Black, reddish or mottled

The Vikhan is a breed of livestock guardian dog from Pakistan and India. In Pakistan, it is found specifically the Chitral region of the Khyber Pakhtunkhwa Province, while in India, it is found in Himachal Pradesh. The breed's name is derived from the Sanskrit word "vikh", meaning broken, noseless or hermit. It is possible the name was given due to the broken, uneven land on which it is found, or because the breed often lives in solitude from other parts of the Indian sub-continent.

Compared to other livestock guardian breeds, the Vikhan is lighter framed, built more for speed than strength, resembling a large Scotch Collie. The breed is usually black, reddish or mottled in colour with drooped ears and a bushy tail; its long coat is often shorn and the hair used to make a dark wool.

In its home range, the Vikhan is used to guard flocks of sheep from predators, including the leopard. To protect the breed's neck from the latter's teeth, it is frequently fitted with a thick iron collar.

== See also ==
- List of dog breeds
- List of dog breeds from India
