= Jonangi =

Dog breed

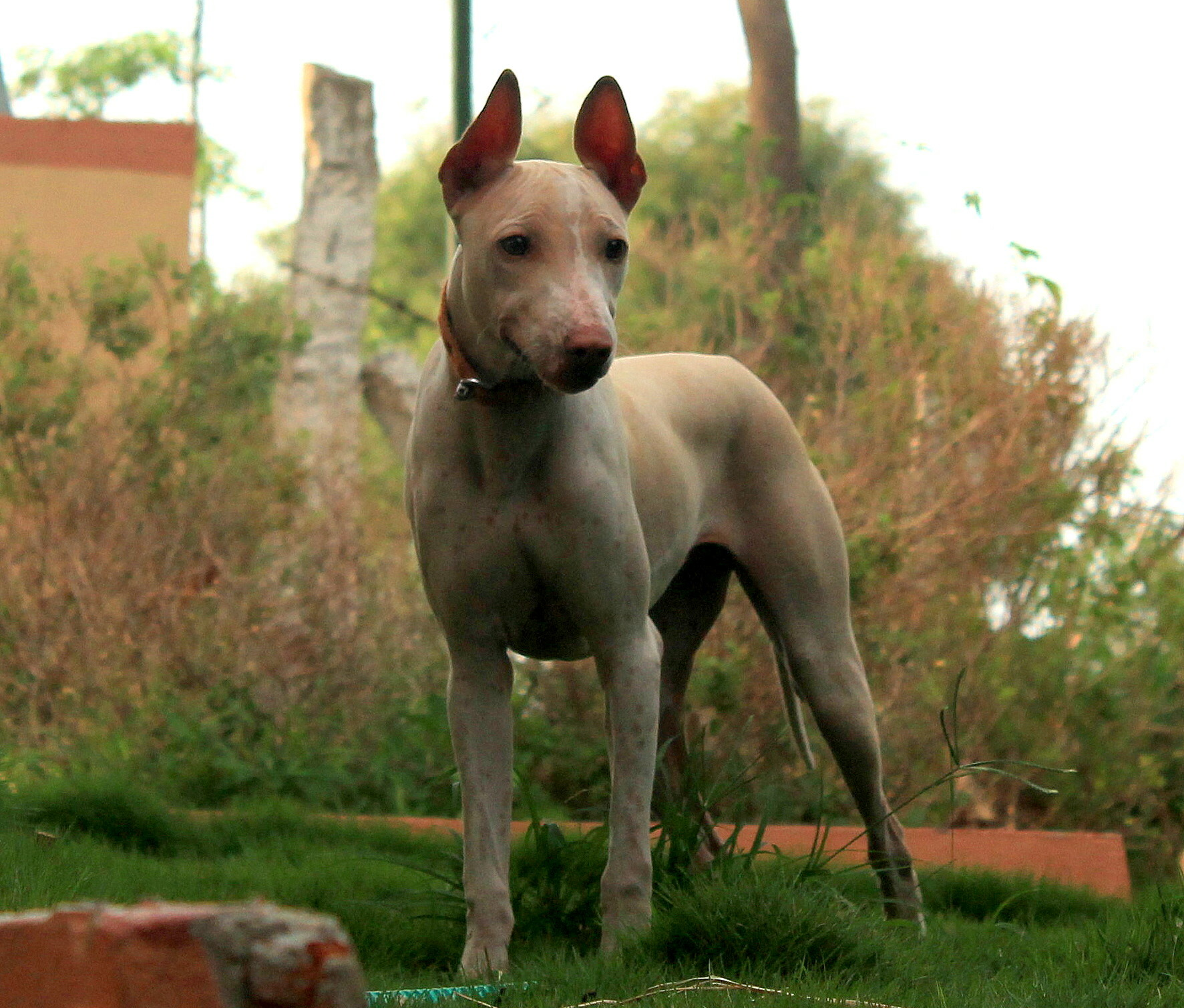
- Origin: South India
- Breed status: Not recognised as a breed by any major kennel club.
Traits
| Height | Males | 18–22 in (46–56 cm) |
| | Females | 18–22 in (46–56 cm) |
| Weight | Males | 55–85 lb (25–39 kg) |
| | Females | 45–65 lb (20–29 kg) |
- Coat: Short, dense
- Color: White, white with occasional black spots, black, grey, brindle

The Jonangi, also known as Jonangi Jagilam or Kolleti Jagilam, is an indigenous hairless dog breed from India. Primarily found in Andhra Pradesh, parts of Karnataka, and along the eastern coast from West Bengal to Tamil Nadu, it was historically common near Kolleru Lake in West Godavari and Krishna districts. The Jonangi is a short-haired breed traditionally used for hunting, herding, and guarding.

While not recognized by major kennel clubs, the breed is showcased at local beach festivals in Andhra Pradesh.

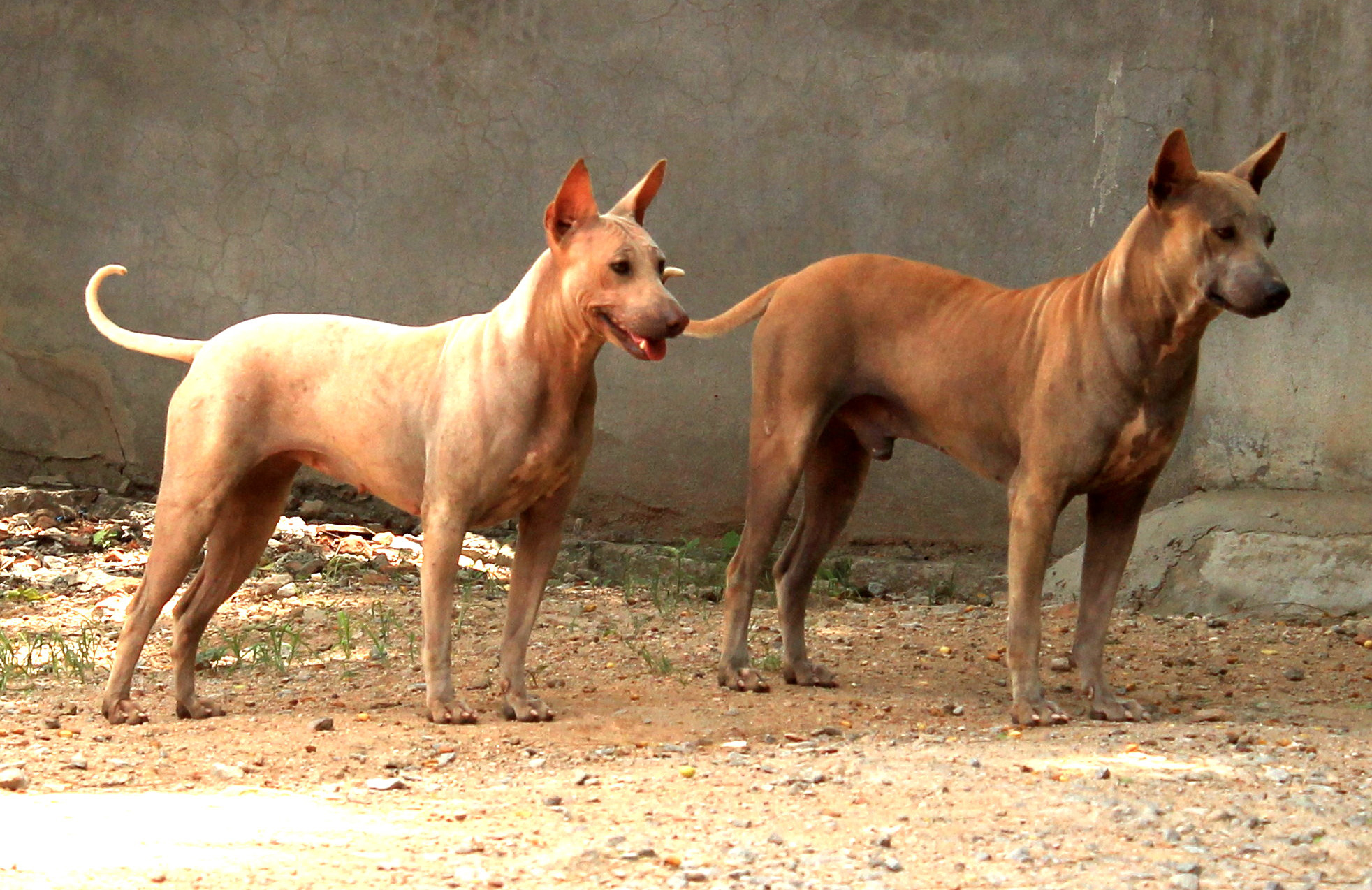
Jonangi dogs on guard duty

== Characteristics ==
=== Temperament ===
The Jonangi is typically loyal to a single person or family. An agile breed, it is capable of covering large distances efficiently.

Most Jonangis serve as effective working dogs, guarding properties and livestock. They coexist well with farm animals including poultry, goats, sheep, and cattle. The breed is known for digging ditches for resting. Proper socialization and positive reinforcement training can produce confident adult dogs suitable as family companions.

=== Breeding ===
Females typically come into heat biannually, with litter sizes ranging from 3–5 puppies. Their fertility rates are comparable to other Indian dog breeds.

== Historical and current use ==
Traditionally employed for hunting small game, herding ducks, and as watchdogs, their primary function as duck herders around Kolleru Lake diminished with the shift to aquaculture.

== Conservation status ==
=== Population decline ===
Previously widespread along India's coastline, the breed's numbers drastically declined as duck farming decreased. Considered pests by some aquaculture farmers, many Jonangis were killed, pushing the breed toward extinction. Surviving dogs developed unique fishing behaviors in their semi-feral state.

=== Revival efforts ===
Currently found mainly in Andhra Pradesh, Karnataka, Tamil Nadu, Maharashtra, and Goa, the breed has gained renewed interest among Asil chicken breeders and farmers for livestock protection.

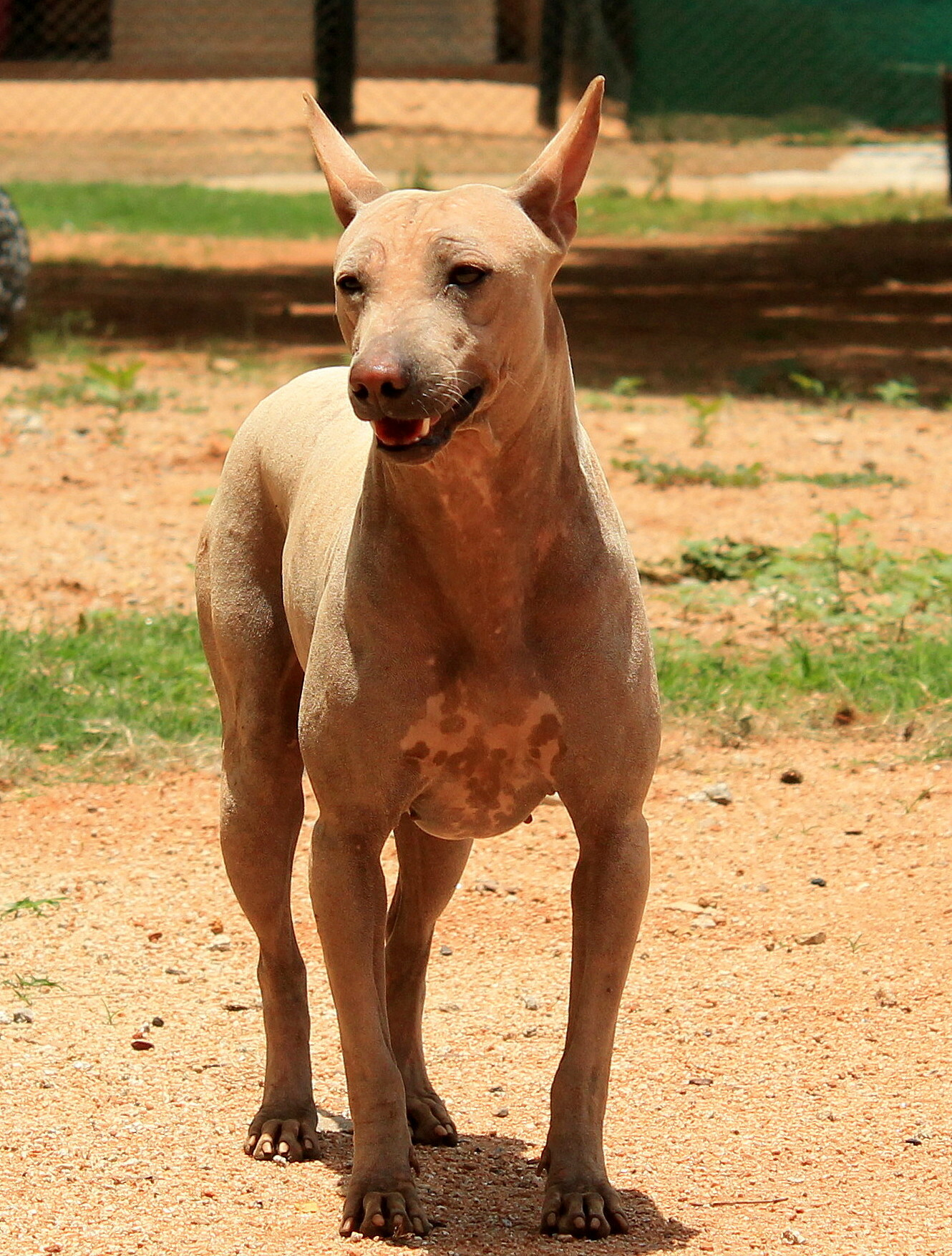
A fully grown Jonangi

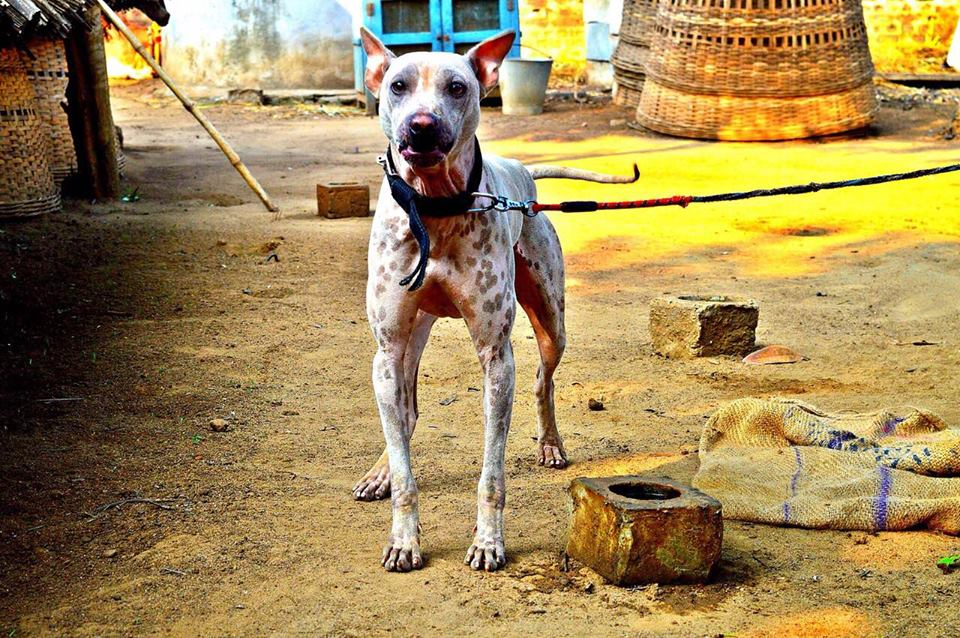
Jonangi from Konkan Coast. (Courtesy: Shailesh Nabar)

== See also ==
- List of dog breeds
- List of dog breeds from India
