= Remount Veterinary Corps =

Remount Veterinary Corps (RVC)
- Insignia of the Remount Veterinary Corps
- Active: 1779 - Present
- Country: India
- Allegiance: Indian Army
- Garrison/HQ: Meerut
- Motto: Pashu Seva Asmakam Dharma
- Anniversaries: 14 December

Commanders
- Major general: Devender Kumar

Remount Veterinary Corps flag

The Remount Veterinary Corps is an administrative and operational branch of the Indian Army, and one of its oldest formations. It is responsible for breeding, rearing and training of all animals used in the army.

== History ==
The corps was initially raised in Bengal in 1779 as the 'Stud Department'. The Army Veterinary Corps was officially established on 14 December 1920. The partition in 1947 led to the division of the assets of the Veterinary and Military Farms corporations in a 2:1 ratio for the Indian and Pakistani armies. The combined Remount, Veterinary and Farms Corporation separated as independent corps in May 1960.

The veterinary corps provided veterinary cover to animals in World War I, and saw action in Palestine and Russia. They were initially allowed to carry only kukris as weapons, but since World War II, they have been allowed to use all normal weapons including rifles and bayonets. In April 1985, the breeding base of RVC was expanded from 2700 to 3973 animals, to attain self-sufficiency in animal production. Karnataka's Mudhol Hound, an Indian dog breed, is being trained to serve in the Indian Army, making it the first Indian dog breed to be trained for army duty.

RVC established the Zanskar Pony Breeding and Training Centre in Ladakh, which at 3146 m above sea level has been declared as the highest stud farm in the world by the Limca Book of Records. The centre is involved in breeding Zaniskari ponies for use by the army at high altitudes.

== Humanitarian assistance ==
RVC has also been involved in providing veterinary assistance to rural areas in Jammu and Kashmir and North East India under Project Sadbhavana. The corps has also been associated with passing on their expertise and training veterinary students of the Sher-e-Kashmir University of Agricultural Sciences and Technology of Jammu. RVC has also provided assistance as part of the Indian contingent in many UN missions across the world.

== Gallery ==
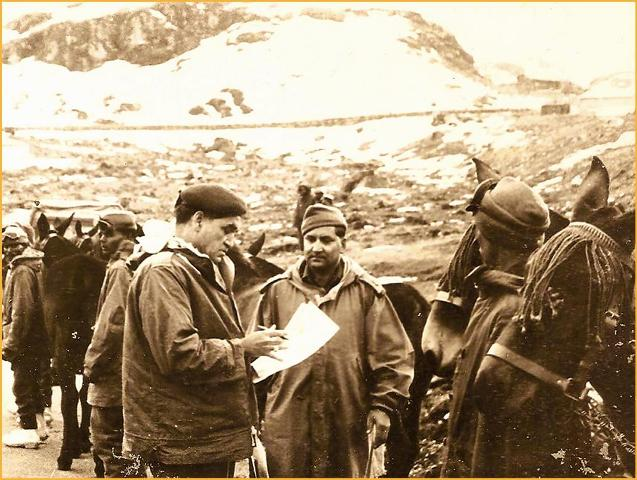
Major General SN Srivastava supervising RVC operations at Zoji La Pass

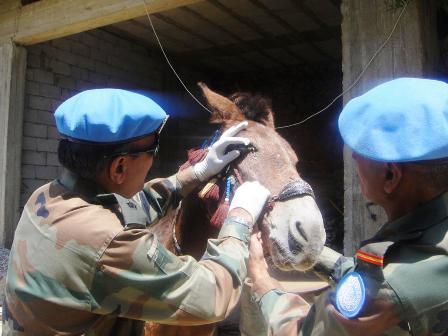
RVC personnel serving as part of the Indian contingent in UNMISS

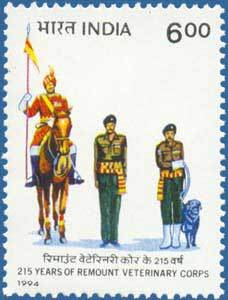
1994 postal stamp marking the 215th anniversary of the RVC
