= Himalayan Sheepdog =

Working dog breed

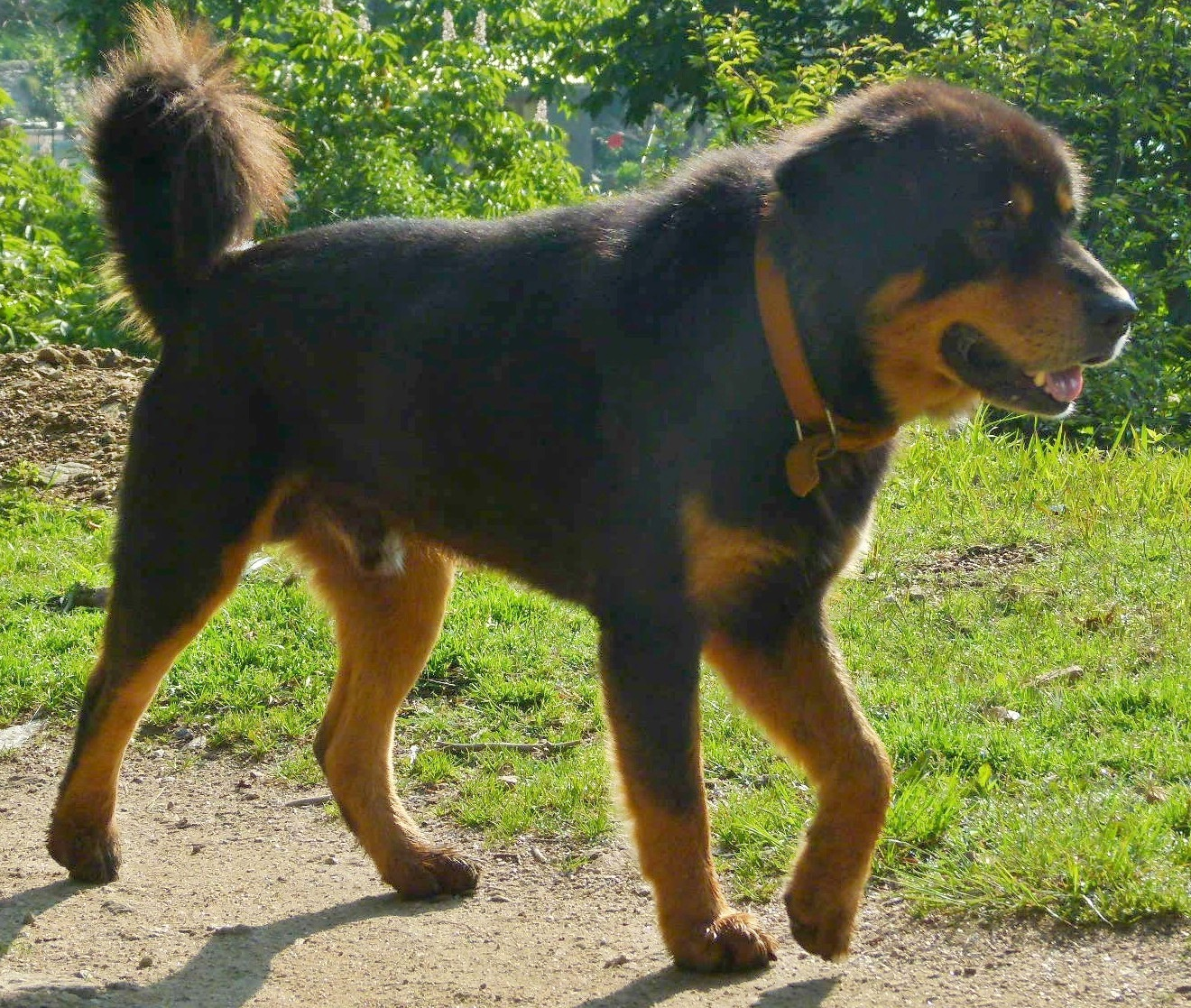
- A Himalayan sheepdog
- Other names: Bhote Kukur, Gaddi Kutta, Bhotia, Bangara, Himalayan Mastiff
- Origin: Nepal, India
- Breed status: Not recognised as a breed by any major kennel club.
Traits
- Height: Typically 51–75 cm (20–30 in), can be up to 76 cm (30 in)
- Weight: 23–41 kg (51–90 lb)
- Coat: Long, thick and harsh double coat
- Colour: Black and tan or solid black, some white markings on the extremities

The Himalayan Sheepdog, known locally by various names including the Bhote Kukur, Bhotia, Gaddi Kutta or Bangara, and sometimes called the Himalayan Mastiff, is a breed of livestock guardian dog from the Himalayas, covering Nepal and India. The Himalayan Sheepdog is found in the Himalayan foothills from eastern Nepal to Kashmir. The breed is primarily used as a livestock guardian dog, protecting flocks of yak and sheep from various predators, and as a property guardian dog; unusually for a livestock guardian, the breed is also used to assist with herding. The Himalayan Sheepdog is also used to assist in hunting.

== History ==
Tracing back to ancient times, Himalayan Sheepdogs were guardians and companion for shepherds as well as Nepalese monasteries. Due to the decline in nomadic lifestyles, the population has also been in decline, though there are still dedicated breeders and enthusiasts working to preserve and promote the breed. The breed is recognized by International Kennel Club under the name bhote kukur.

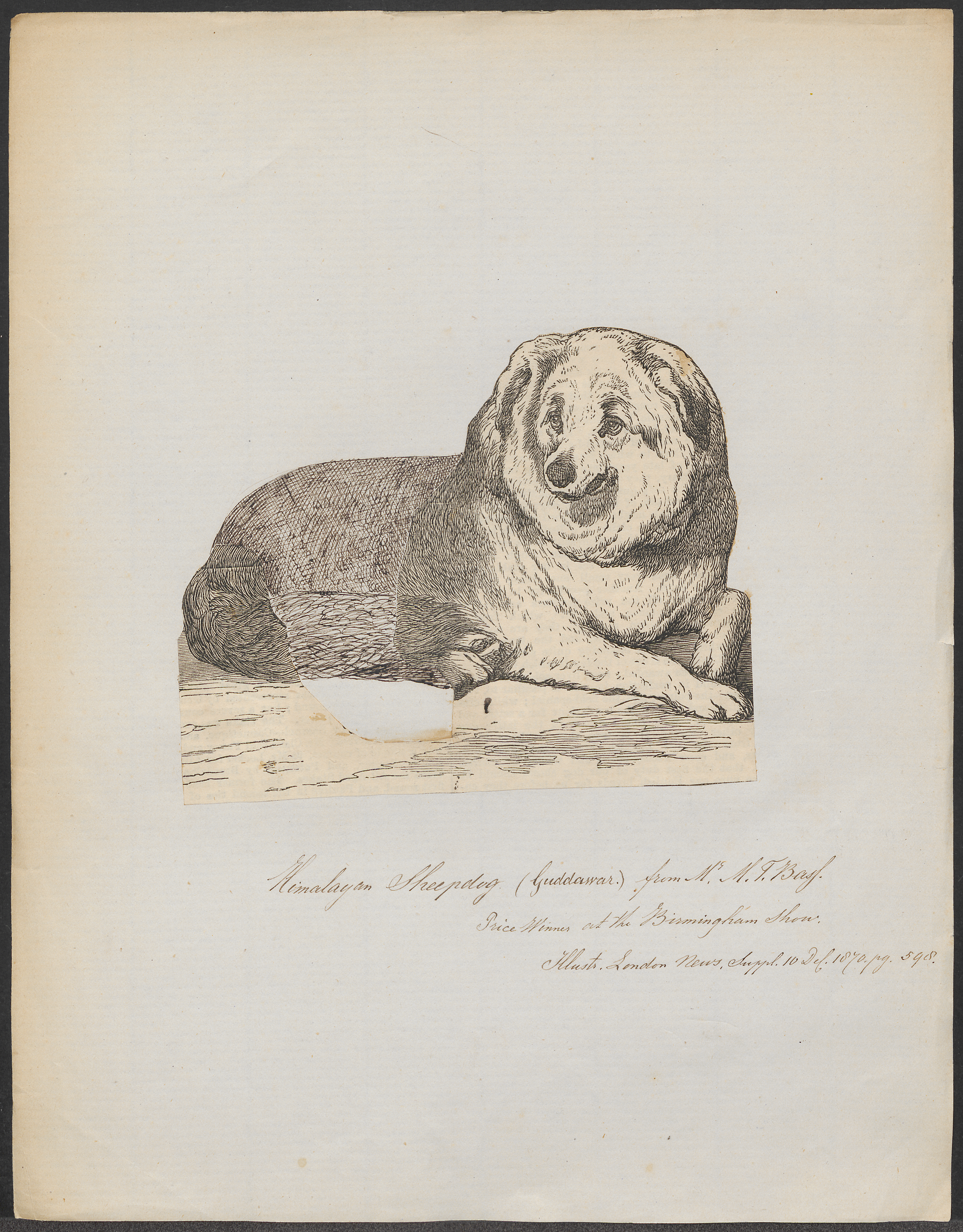
Himalayan Sheepdog (Guddawar) c. 1870

Closely related to the slightly larger Tibetan Mastiff, Himalayan Sheepdogs are distinguished by being more protective against people. There are subtypes of the breed found in the Kumaon hills and Chamba; the former, which is known as the cypro kukur or kumaon mastiff, is brindle, rich golden brown or black in colour, the latter is smaller than most of the breed and resemble a larger, longer-haired black Labrador Retriever. Bhutan is home to a larger variant of the Himalayan Sheepdog, known there as the bhutia sheepdog.

== Description ==
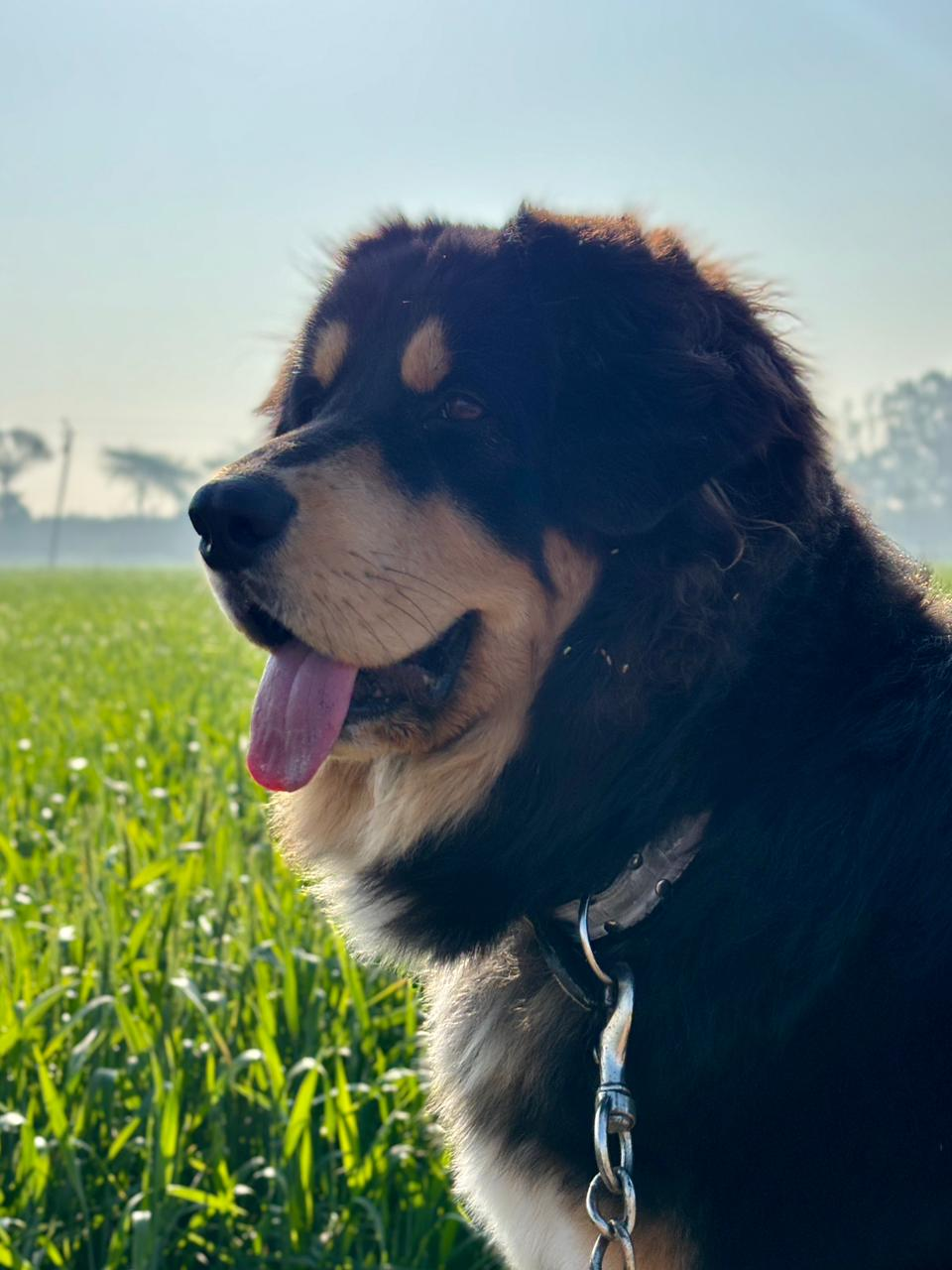
10 months old Gaddi puppy

Himalayan Sheepdogs are found in the Himalayas from Kashmir to eastern Nepal. The breed is primarily used as a livestock guardian dog, protecting flocks of yak and sheep from various predators, and as a property guardian dog; unusually for a livestock guardian, the breed is also used to assist with herding. They may also be used to assist in hunting. Himalayan Sheepdogs are especially adapted to high altitudes, and the breed's double coat is typically harsh and thick and they are usually black and tan or solid black with some white markings on their toes, chest and neck. They have small drooped ears and a heavily plumed tail that is curled over their back. The breed has a distinctive deep bark.

Feral Himalayan Sheepdogs compete with snow leopards in the Himalayas, particularly in Gangotri National Park, as both share prey including the bharal. This has threatening the food chain and the survival of snow leopards, which are already classified as vulnerable. The problem is worsened by the growing population of these dogs, many of which hunt in packs and often supplement their diet from human scraps, creating further ecological imbalances.

In 2005 the Himalayan Sheepdog was one of four dog breeds featured on a set of postage stamps released by the Indian Ministry of Communications and Information Technology to celebrate the country's canine heritage.

A stray Himalayan Sheepdog mix achieved the highest known altitude scaled by a dog after accompanied mountain climbers to the summit of Baruntse at 7,129 metres (23,389 ft).

== See also ==
- List of dog breeds
- List of dog breeds from India
- Kuchi
