= Haofa Tangkhul Hui =

Haofa Tangkhul hui
- Origin: India
- Breed status: Not recognised as a breed by any major kennel club.
Traits
Height	Males	61–61 cm (24–24 in)
	Females	61–61 cm (24–24 in)
- Weight: 70–90 kg (150–200 lb)
- Coat: short coat
- Colour: Black
- Litter size: 1–3

The Haofa or Tangkhul Hui is a breed of dog raised by the Tangkhul people in the Ukhrul district of Manipur in northeastern India. They were traditionally used entirely for hunting. Although their presence has lessened in the modern day, being estimated at 1,000 -individuals in 2022, the Indian Army has inducted them into the force.

== Traits ==
They are an intelligent breed that make good watchdogs. Traditionally, their ears and tails are docked, to prevent the extremities from being injured during fights with other dogs or animals. They are black in color, with white markings. They come in two sizes, with the smaller size being used to hunt small game which hide in burrows or holes. The larger variety has a long muzzle and wide jaws, and has been compared to a bear in appearance. The breed is known for its stamina, rather than its speed.

== Recognition ==
Although not yet officially recognized as a distinct breed, locals from Manipur hope to establish the breed both to preserve them as a cultural symbol and as a source of income in the area.

Tennoson Pheirei founded the Phungcham Haofa Lovers Association (PHLA), the Association for Haofa in 2021, and as of February 2023 had 40 members. A 2021 resolution in the village of Phungcham declared that the Haofa would be the only breed allowed to be raised in the village, in an effort to improve the population's decline in numbers.

In December 2022, registration of the breed by the Indian Council of Agricultural Research-National Bureau of Animal Genetic Resources was in the final stages.

That same month, the first Phungcham Haofa Festival was held in the region.
