= Mudhol Hound =

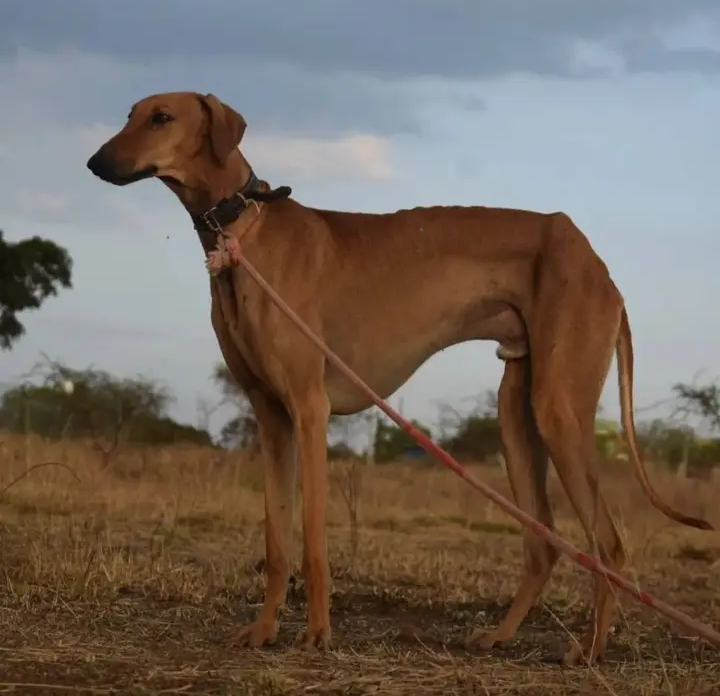
- Other names: Caravan Hound; Kathewar Dog
- Origin: Mudhol, Karnataka, India
Traits
- Weight: 9.1–13.6 kg (20–30 lb)

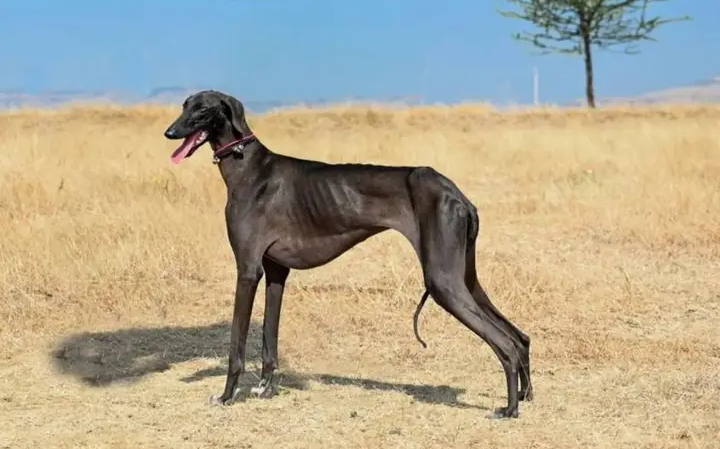
Mudhol Hound

The Mudhol Hound (also the Caravan Hound) is a breed of sighthound from India.

The Kennel Club of India (KCI) and Indian National Kennel Club (INKC) recognize the breed under different breed names. The KCI registers it as a Caravan Hound while the INKC uses the name Mudhol Hound. A variety of the breed with more hair is the Pashmi Hound.

== Etymology ==
The Deccan Plateau covers parts of the states of Karnataka, Maharashtra, and, to a lesser degree, Telangana. The breed is popular in and around Mudhol Taluk of Karnataka and thus the breed got the name Mudhol Hound.

== History ==
Shrimant Rajesaheb Malojirao Ghorpade of Mudhol (1884–1937) of the Mudhol State is credited with reviving the Mudhol Hound. He noticed local tribal people called Bedar (Fearless); also called Berad (not - crying) using these hounds for hunting. Using selective breeding, he was able to restore the royal Mudhol Hound. On a visit to England in the early 1900s, the Maharaja of Mudhol State presented King George V a pair of hounds, which popularized the Mudhol Hound breed.

== Description ==
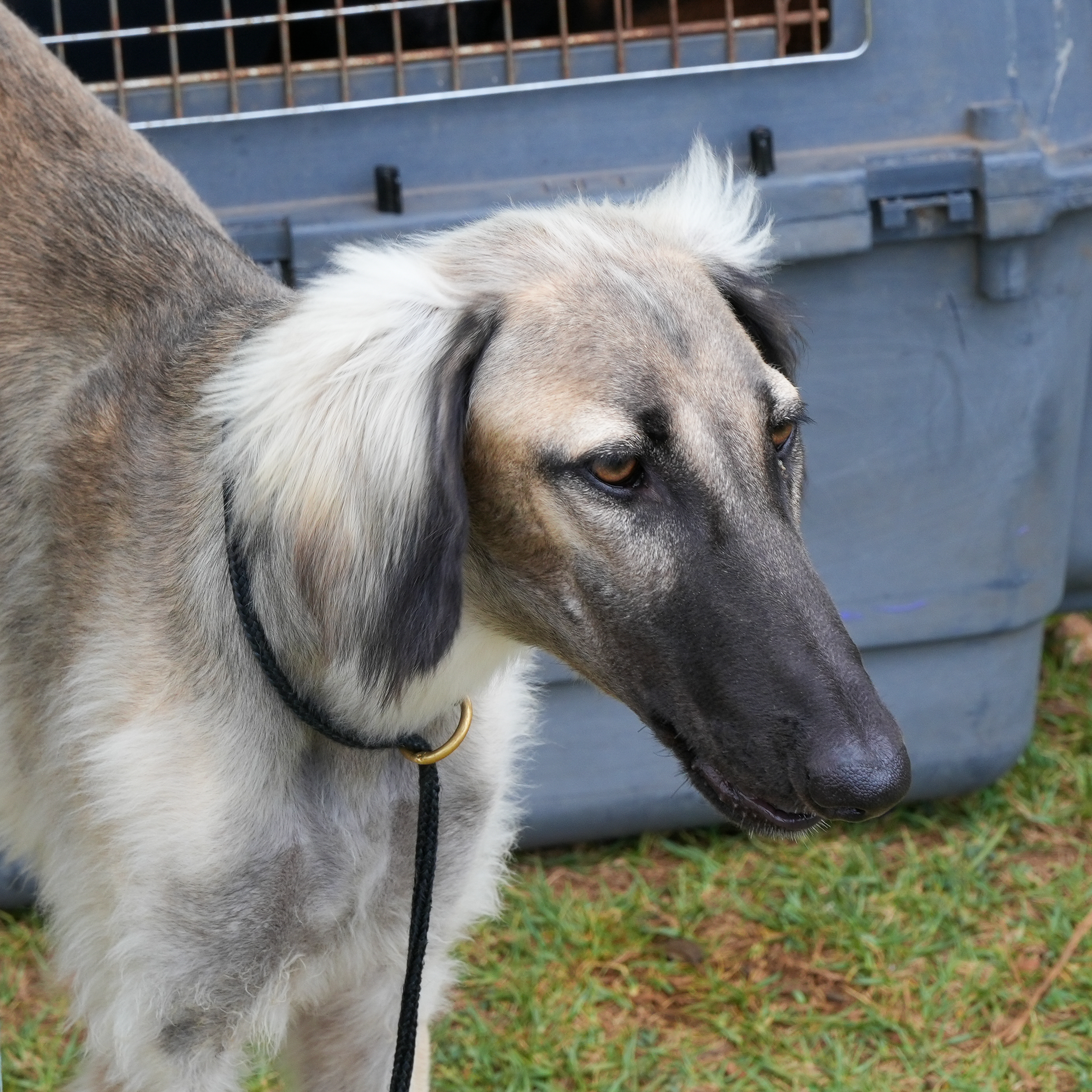
Hairy Pashmi Hound, Ooty Dog Show, 2026

About 750 families in and around Mudhol town of Karnataka raise this breed for marketing the puppies.

The Mudhol Hound has a smooth coat. A variety with more hair is the Pashmi Hound; the hair on the ears, tail and undersides of the Pashmi is especially prominent.

The Indian Army has expressed its desire to use the Mudhol Sighthound for surveillance and border protection duties. It has obtained six Mudhol dogs for testing at the Army's Remount Veterinary Corps at Meerut. The dogs were bred after selection, at the Canine Research and Information Centre in Thimmapur near Mudhol in Bagalkot district of Karnataka. The CRIC is a unit of the Karnataka Veterinary, Animal and Fisheries Sciences University, Bidar.

== In culture ==
In 2005 the Mudhol Hound was one of four Indian dog breeds featured on a set of postage stamps released by the Indian Ministry of Communications and Information Technology to celebrate the country's canine heritage.

== See also ==
- List of dog breeds
- List of dog breeds from India
