= Banjara Hound =

Breed of dog

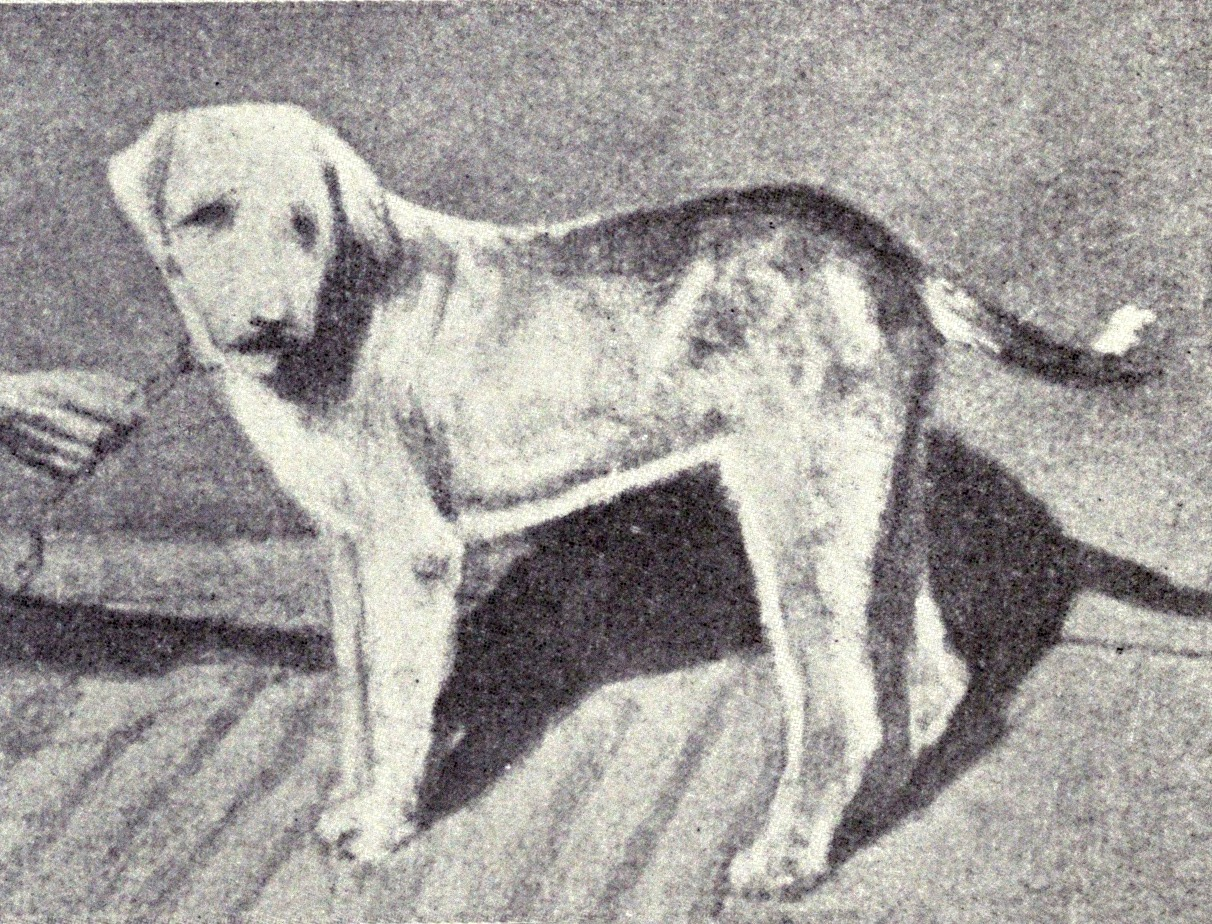
- Other names: Banjāri Hound, Vanjāri Hound, Banjāri Greyhound, Vanchāri Hound, Wanjāri Hound
- Origin: India

The Banjara Hound, also known as the Banjari Hound, is a breed of dog found in India. It is a sighthound-type dog bred and used for hunting by the nomadic Banjara of Maharashtra. The Banjara Hound is a rough-coated breed of sighthound, usually brindle or solid-coloured. It resembles a large Saluki, standing around 28 in (71 cm), and is famed for its stamina and ability to pull down deer.

This breed is known for its exceptional speed and agility, making it an excellent hunter of antelopes and hares. The Banjara Hound is a large dog, with males typically weighing between 61-70 pounds (27–31 kg) and females weighing between 52-61 pounds (23–27 kg). The breed has a fine coat that comes in various colors, including light brown, merle, cream, black, brown & white, brindle, white, and brown.

In terms of temperament, the Banjara Hound is gentle and intelligent, but it can be quite territorial and protective of its property. It is not the easiest breed to train, requiring time and repetition to learn new commands. Despite this, it is highly valued for its watchdog abilities and its strong prey drive.

The Banjara Hound has a life expectancy of 12–14 years and prefers average to warm weather conditions. It is not hypoallergenic and has a medium level of stinkiness and drooling tendency. The breed is not particularly friendly with strangers, children, or other pets, making it less suitable for first-time dog owners.

== See also ==
- List of dog breeds
- List of dog breeds from India
