= Ramanadhapuram Mandai =

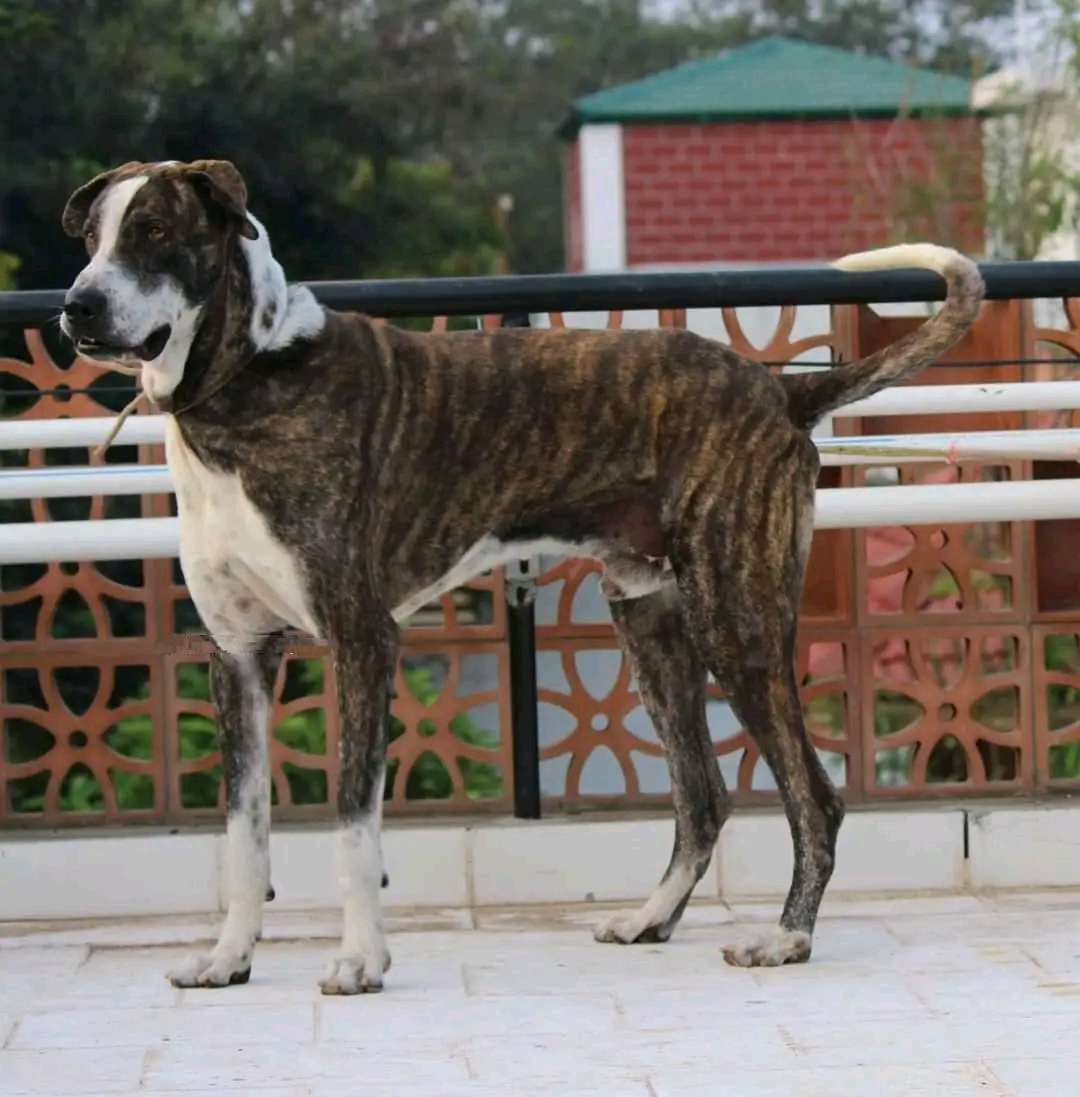
- Male Dog
- Other names: Ramanadhapuram Mandai, Mandai, Ramanadhapuram Kombai
- Origin: India
Traits
Height	Males	61–79 cm (24–31 in)
	Females	61–78 cm (24–31 in)
- Weight: 30–60 kg (66–132 lb)
	Males	40–50 kg (88–110 lb)
	Females	25–35 kg (55–77 lb)
- Coat: short coat
- Colour: Black and Wight, Grey, bluish grey, tan with wight, piebald, tri-colour
- Litter size: 1–3
Kennel club standards
- Kennel Club of India: standard

The Ramanathapuram Mandai dog, Ramanathapuram Mandai dog or herd dog (Ramnad Kombai, Ramanathapuram komba dog or manthai dog) is a dog breed found in the Ramanathapuram district of Tamil Nadu, India. Mandai dogs are hound dogs; in many temple sculptures of Ramanathapuram district, images of this dog are found, indicating the long presence of this dog in the district.

This dog is 26 to 30 inches tall, with a large body, large legs, strong bones, and a thick tail. Its head is large, with a broad jaw, a blunt thick nose, a broad curved forehead, and large ears that hang down like the ears of a goat. Its feet and tip of the tail are white. It can live for 18 to 19 years.

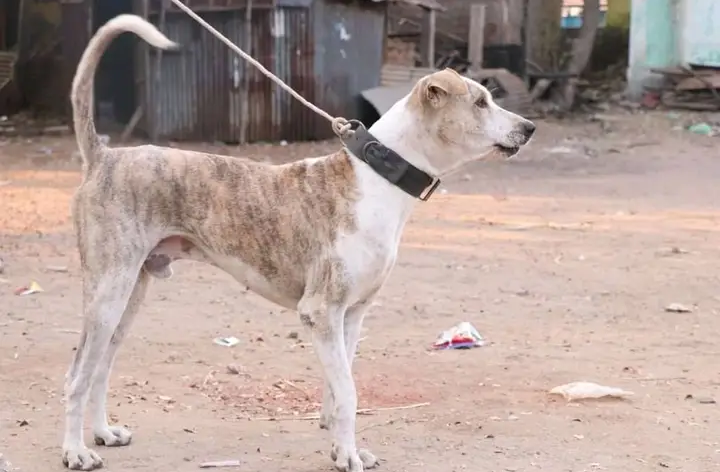

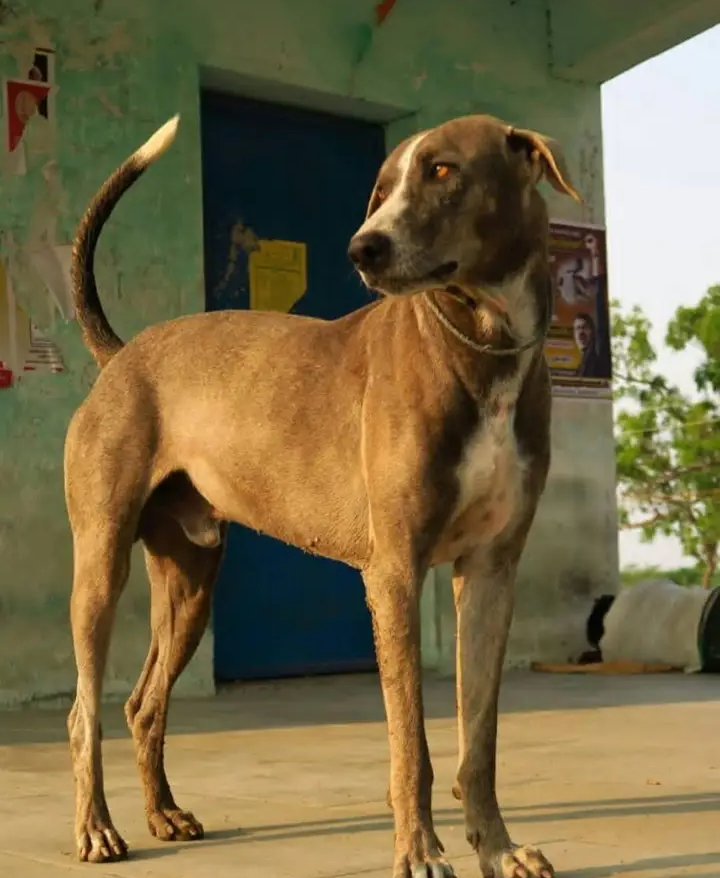
