= Chippiparai =

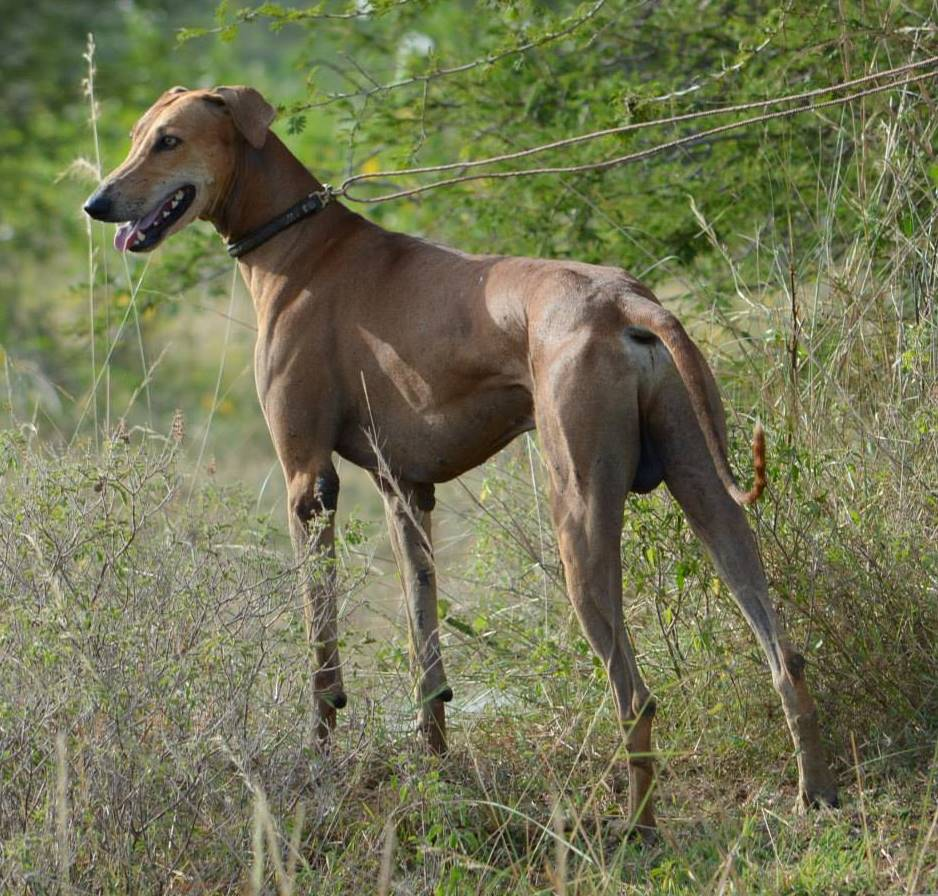
- Origin: India
Traits
Height	Males	63 cm (25 in) average
	Females	56 cm (22 in) average
- Coat: Short
- Colour: Fawn and White/Brindle and White/Fawn/Grey Brindle/Red
Kennel club standards

The Chippiparai is a breed of sighthound from the State of Tamil Nadu in southern India.

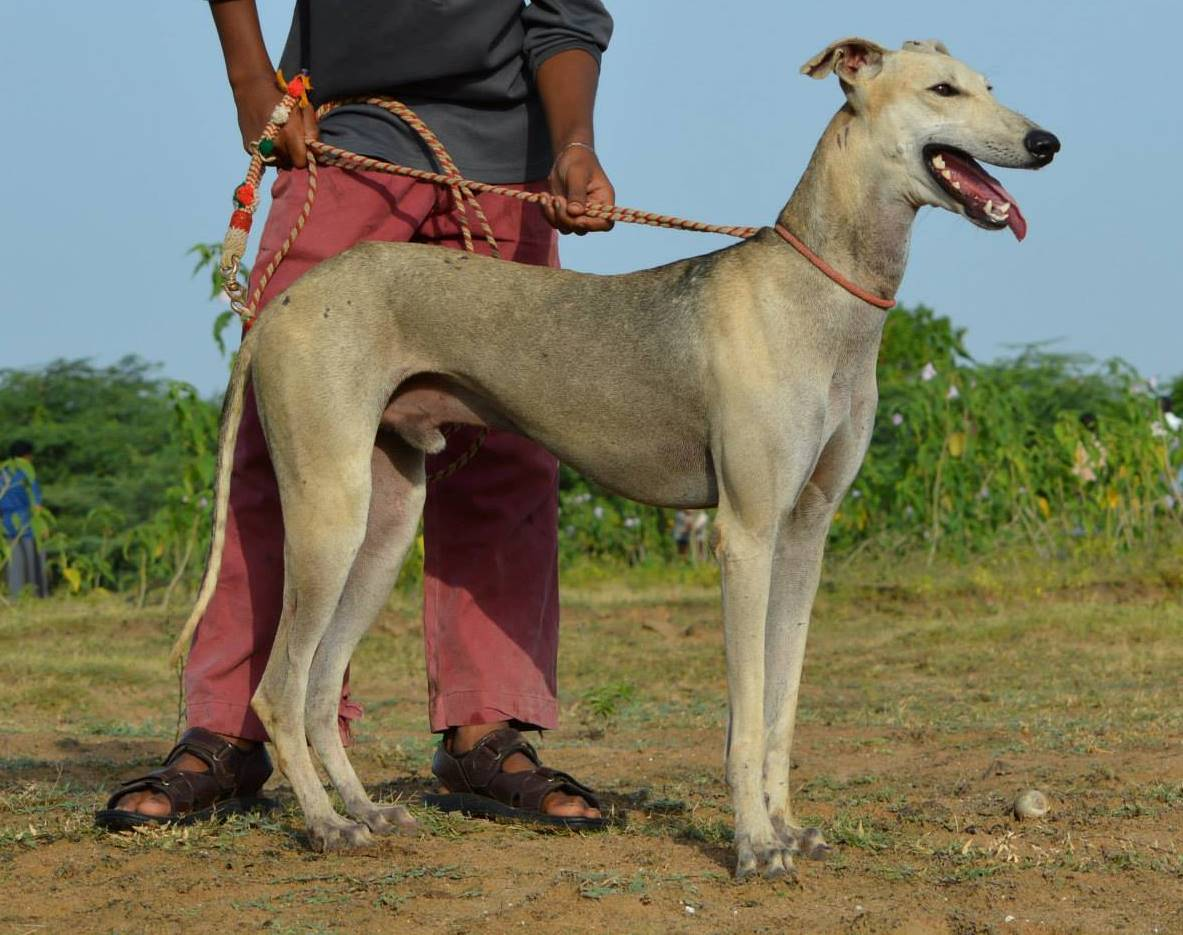
grey colour chippipara

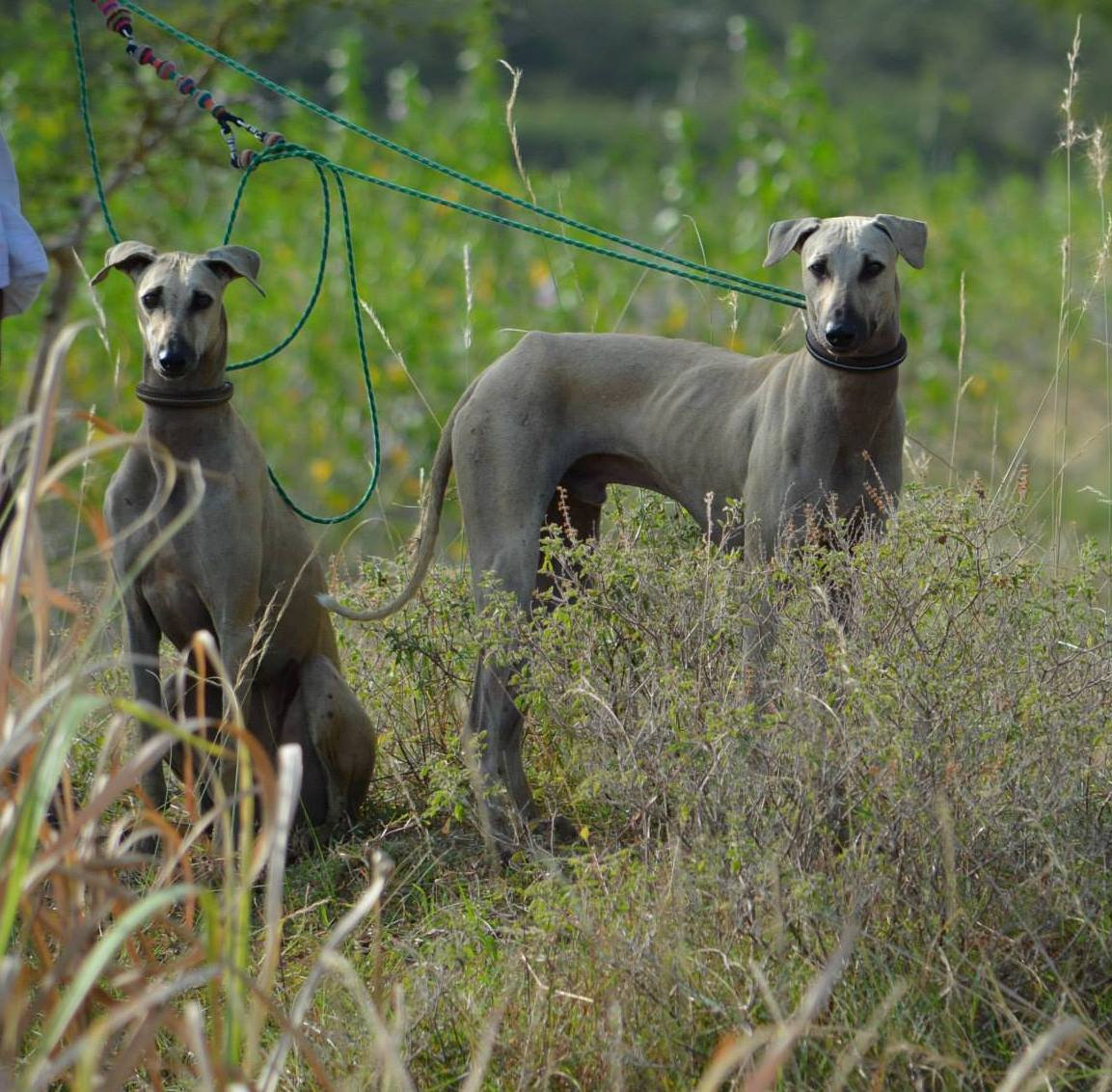

The Chippiparai has typical streamlined sighthound features with long legs and a lean and lithe frame built for speed. The breed is usually white in colour, although other colours can be found. It averages 61 centimetres (24 in) in height at the withers, dogs averaging 63 centimetres (25 in) and bitches 56 centimetres (22 in). A hardy breed, the Chippiparai is reputed to prefer a single master, shunning food and pats from anyone except its handler. The Chippiparai is often regarded as the most intelligent and biddable of India's native dog breeds.

The Chippiparai is most frequently found in the regions of Virudhunagar, Tirunelveli, Thenkasi, Thoothukudi, and Madurai. Thought to be descended from the Saluki, the breed was historically kept by royalty in southern India, its name derived from a village name of Sippipparai in Vembakottai Taluk of Virudhunagar District. The Chippiparai was traditionally used to hunt small game, predominantly hare. Due to its intelligence and biddable nature, the breed has successfully been trained as police dogs.

== See also ==
- List of dog breeds
- List of dog breeds from India
