= Kennel Club of India =

Purebred dog registry

The Kennel Club of India is a registry of purebred dogs in India. As well as maintaining a registry of pedigrees, the club promotes and sanctions events for purebred dogs, including annual dog shows and specialty shows. The Kennel Club of India is a member of the Fédération Cynologique Internationale.

The Kennel Club of India is also one of the few kennel clubs to be members of the International Organization for Standardization.

== History ==
There were several established kennel clubs in India during the British colonial period from 1857 to 1947, including in Hyderabad, Ootacamund, Mysore, and Calcutta. These clubs followed procedures followed in kennel clubs in the United Kingdom.

In 1896, the North Indian Kennel Association was formed. It was a precursor to the Kennel Club of India. It held its first dog show in Lahore in 1896.

== Today ==
The Kennel Club of India is the leading private society on registration on purebreds and maintains the recognized registry. It issues pedigrees for purebreds and litters. It hosts annual shows across the country and awards championships to various breeds of dogs.

The 2019 chairman of KCI is Mr. S. Pathy who has shown and bred dogs for over forty years under the kennel name "Sans Craintes" (meaning "without fear" in French). Pathy is also a member of the Singapore Kennel Club and an all-breeds judge. He has bred a few "Dog of the Year" winners and bred Dobermans, Labradors, Siberian Huskies and other breeds. C.V. Sudarsan, an expert on whippets is the secretary.

== Registration ==
The Kennel Club of India registers litters of puppies born in India whose sire and dam have both been registered (listed as "Bred in India"). The club also registers puppies and dogs that have been imported from other countries. The club also registers puppies and dogs that are purebred but whose parents do not carry any papers. These dogs are registered as purebreds with "unknown pedigree".

Pedigree papers or certificates are issued by the club and are continuously appended as the dog keeps winning championships or keeps changing owners.

The most common breeds registered by the Kennel Club of India are Great Danes, Rottweilers, Labrador Retrievers, Golden Retrievers, German Shepherds, Dachshunds, Dalmatians, Dobermanns and Pugs.

== Dog shows ==
Specialty and general dog shows are conducted by the Kennel Club of India all over the country. These shows are generally held from December to May. The shows follow procedures and guidelines complying with regulations of the Fédération Cynologique Internationale.

Dogs are issued challenge certificates and championship certificates. Dogs are awarded points (depending on their breed and temperament) in every dog show and at the end of the year. The dog receiving the most show points receives the Dog of the Year award.

The other awards include: Best in Class, Best of Breed, Best in Group, Best in Show

The club also has awards for breeders of the year and also a special award for "Bred in India" dogs to encourage breeders to develop good bloodlines in India.

== Specialty dog shows ==
In addition to general dog shows, the kennel Club of India organizes specialty dog shows meant for particular breeds only. This include dog shows for separate breeds. Many breeds in India have their own clubs that participate in these events. These clubs include:

- German Shepherd Dog Club of India
- Great Dane Club of India
- Indian Sieger Show
- The Labrador Retriever Club Of India
- Tamil Nadu Rottweiler Association
- Great Dane Club Of India (South)

== The Indian Kennel Gazette ==
In addition to the shows, the Kennel Club of India publishes a monthly magazine, the Indian Kennel Gazette for all its members. It is not for sale commercially.
