= Kennel club =

Organization working with dog breeding

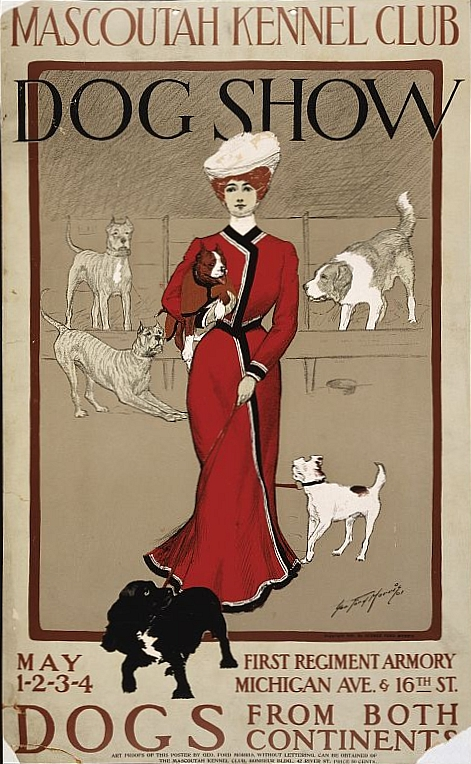
1901 poster advertising a dog show at the Mascoutah Kennel Club.

A kennel club (known as a kennel council or canine council in some countries) is an organization for canine affairs that concerns itself with the breeding, showing and promotion of more than one breed of dog. Kennel clubs became popular in the mid 19th century. All-encompassing kennel clubs are also referred to as 'all-breed clubs', although "all" means only those breeds that they have decided to recognize, and "breed" means purebred dogs, not including dog hybrids and crossbreeds or mixed-breed dogs. A club that handles only one breed is known as a breed club.

== Role ==
Kennel clubs maintain breed standards, record pedigrees, and issue the rules for conformation dog shows and trials and accreditation of judges. They often serve as registries, which are lists of adult purebred dogs and lists of litters of puppies born to purebred parents. A kennel club manages all these aspects of the dog breeds it claims to represent, either directly or through its member bodies.

Today's kennel clubs specialize in working dogs or conformation show dogs. In today's parlance, dog clubs for mixed-breed dogs are gaining ground and are now sometimes categorized as kennel clubs. The original purpose of a kennel club, however, was the breeding and showing of conformation bench purebreds, and this remains the most widely accepted definition. Widely known kennel clubs such as The Kennel Club, the American Kennel Club, the United Kennel Club, and the Canadian Kennel Club each offer canine events and training programs as well as dog registration services.

== History ==
By the mid-19th century, ownership of selectively bred dogs was common among the affluent throughout Europe.

Kennel clubs were founded from the necessity to bring order out of chaos to the sport of public competitive dog exhibitions. The first dog show in England was held in 1859, which was a social affair held by English aristocrats to raise funds for charity. They grew in popularity over fourteen years and were held in a rather ad hoc manner.

In 1859, the first dog show society came into existence in Birmingham, England. Within three years, the Société impériale zoologique d'acclimatation held the first dog show on the European continent in Paris, exhibiting a range of breeds, although the definition of guarding a breed remained open to interpretation.

Recognizing the necessity for the establishment of a governing body with punitive powers, MP Sewallis Shirley, called a group of well-known fanciers together and The Kennel Club was formed. In April 1873 a small group of people had a meeting in a three-roomed flat, which led later that year to the Kennel Club's first show at The Crystal Palace with 975 entrants.

The first general meeting of the Kennel Club took place in Birmingham's Great Western Hotel in December 1874. During the same year, one of the first important actions of the club was to publish a stud book, which contained the pedigrees of 4,027 dogs that had won prizes at shows in the previous fourteen years. Rules were formed and classifications established.

In 1881, the French Société Centrale Canine was founded, followed by the Italian Ente Nazionale della Cinofilia Italiana (ENCI) in 1882, the American Kennel Club in 1884 and the Swedish Svenska Kennelklubben (SKK) in 1889. The United Kennel Club was established in 1898. The Fédération Cynologique Internationale was formed in 1911, under the auspices of the Austrian, Belgian, Dutch, French and German canine societies. The new kennel club rules reflected that pedigrees must be registered with their respective club.

Clubs acted as a court of appeal to set and maintain standards. They successfully popularized the sport of dog showing and elevated it from venues such as bars and public houses to fashionable locations. Through a kennel club, people could obtain pedigrees for their dogs, which were included on permanent registers. Kennel clubs have had more influence on the development of dog breeds than any other factor since the original diversification of dogs according to function.

== International kennel clubs ==
Nations that have active groups of dog breeders and people who practice the hobby of dog fancy usually have their own national kennel clubs, often affiliated with those of other countries. Most kennel clubs have reciprocal arrangements and dogs registered in one country can be re-registered in another country if the dog is imported.

The Fédération Cynologique Internationale, sometimes translated as the International Canine Federation in English or simply known by its abbreviation 'FCI', is an international federation of national kennel clubs and purebred registries. The FCI is based in Thuin, Belgium and has 98 members and contract partners (one from each country) and as such, the FCI is considered to be the largest kennel club in the world. Worldwide, the majority of countries are members or have contract partners with the FCI, with only Africa and the Middle East poorly represented. In Europe, only the United Kingdom, Kosovo and Bulgaria are not represented by the FCI. Likewise, in the Americas only the US and Canada are not members.

In contrast to national kennel clubs, the FCI is not a registry and does not issue any pedigree, with the issue of pedigrees and record keeping of breeders and breeder addresses the responsibility of the national canine organisations recognised by the FCI.

The purpose of the FCI is to make sure that the pedigrees and judges are mutually recognised by all the FCI members. At present the FCI recognises 356 breeds, with each breed being considered as the 'property' of a specific country, usually based upon the country where the breed has first originated. These breed 'owner' countries write the breed standard of the specific breed, with the breed standard being a detailed description of the ideal type of the breed, in partnership with and under the oversight of the Standards and Scientific Commissions of the FCI. The FCI is responsible for publication and maintenance of these breed standards, along with the translation of breed standard into the four working languages of the FCI (English, French, German and Spanish). The FCI breed standards act as the reference for the judges at shows held in the FCI member countries, as well as maintaining the qualification and license of judges in dog shows in FCI member countries. For breeders, the FCI breed standards are used as the reference in their attempt to produce top-quality dogs according to the ideal type as set out by the FCI.

== See also ==
- Conformation show
- Kennel
- List of kennel clubs
