= List of kennel clubs =

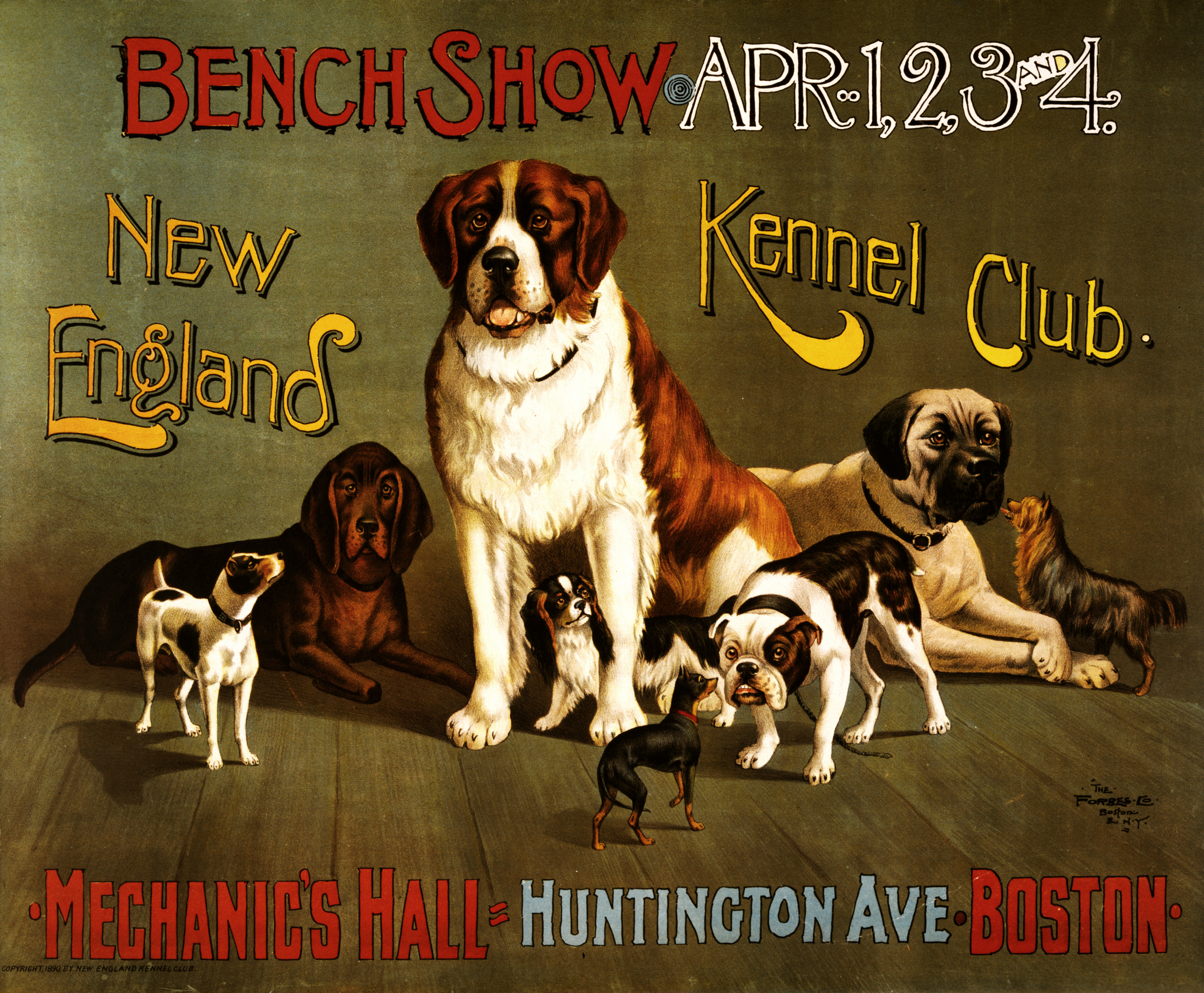
An advertisement for a New England Kennel Club dog show

A kennel club (known as a kennel council or canine council in some countries) is an organization for canine affairs that concerns itself with the breeding, showing and promotion of more than one breed of dog. All-encompassing kennel clubs are also referred to as 'all-breed clubs', although "all" means only those breeds that they have decided to recognize, and "breed" means purebred dogs, not including dog hybrids and crossbreeds or mixed-breed dogs. A club that handles only one breed is known as a breed club.

== List ==
Country	Kennel club	FCI membership	Sources
Argentina	Federación Cinológica Argentina	Yes	
Argentina	Asociación Canina Argentina	No	
Australia	Australian National Kennel Council	Yes	
Austria	Österreichischer Kynologenverband	Yes	
Azerbaijan	Kinologičeskii Sojuz Respubliki Azerbaidžan	Yes	
The Bahamas	Bahamas Kennel Club	Independent	
Bahrain	Kennel Club of Bahrain	Yes	
Barbados	Barbados Kennel Club	Independent	
Belgium	Société Royale Saint-Hubert	Yes	
Belarus	Belorussian Cynological Union	Yes	
Bermuda	Bermuda Kennel Club	Independent	
Bolivia	Kennel Club Boliviano	Yes	
Bosnia and Herzegovina	Unija kinoloških saveza Bosne i Hercegovine	Expelled	
Brazil	Confederação Brasileira de Cinofilia	Yes	
Bulgaria	Bulgarian Republican Federation of Cynology	Yes	
Canada	Canadian Kennel Club	Independent	
Chile	Kennel Club de Chile	Yes	
China	China Kennel Union	Yes	
Colombia	Asociación Club Canino Colombiano	Yes	
Costa Rica	Asociación Canófila Costarricense	Yes	
Croatia	Hrvatski Kinološki Savez	Yes	
Cuba	Federación Cinólogica de Cuba	Yes	
Cyprus	Cyprus Kennel Club	Yes	
Czech Republic	Českomoravská Kynologická Unie	Yes	
Denmark	Dansk Kennel Club	Yes	
Dominican Republic	Federación Canina Dominicana	Yes	
Ecuador	Asociación Ecuatoriana de Registros Caninos	Yes	
Egypt	Egyptian Kennel Fédération	Independent	
El Salvador	Asociación Canófila Salvadoreña	Yes	
Estonia	Eesti Kennelliit	Yes	
Fiji	Fiji Kennel Club	Independent	
Finland	Suomen Kennelliitto	Yes	
France	Société Centrale Canine	Yes	
Georgia	Cynological Federation of Georgia	Yes	
Germany	Verband für das Deutsche Hundewesen	Yes	
Gibraltar	Gibraltar Kennel Club	Yes	
Greece	Kennel Club of Greece	Yes	
Guatemala	Asociación Guatemalteca de Criadores de Perros	Yes	
Guernsey	Guernsey Kennel Club	Independent	
Honduras	Asociación Canófila de Honduras	Yes	
Hong Kong	Hong Kong Kennel Club	Yes	
Hungary	Magyar Ebtenyésztők Országos Egyesülete	Yes	
Hungary	Magyar Kutyások Szövetsége (World Cynologic, Hunting, Sports Alliance)	(WCHSA)	
Iceland	Hundaræktarfélags Íslands	Yes	
India	Indian National Kennel Club	No	
India	Kennel Club of India	Yes	
Indonesia	PERKIN (Perkumpulan Kinologi Indonesia)	Yes	
Iran	Iran Kennel Club	Yes	
Ireland	Irish Kennel Club	Yes	
Israel	Israel Kennel Club	Yes	
Italy	Ente Nazionale della Cinofilia Italiana	Yes	
Jamaica	The Jamaican Kennel Club	Independent	
Japan	Japan Kennel Club	Yes	
Jersey	Kennel Club of Jersey	Independent	
Kazakhstan	Kazakhstan Kennel Club	Yes	
Kenya	East Africa Kennel Club	Affiliated with KC	
Latvia	Latvijas Kinologiska Federacija	Yes	
Lithuania	Lietuvos Kinologu Draugija	Yes	
Luxembourg	Union Cynologique Saint Hubert Luxembourg	Yes	
Madagascar	Societe Canine de Madagascar	Independent	
Malaysia	Malaysian Kennel Association	Yes	
Malta	Malta Kennel Club	Yes	
Malta	Malta Canine Society	No	
Mexico	Federacíon Canófila Mexicana	Yes	
Moldova	Uniunea Chinologică din Moldova	Yes	
Monaco	Société Canine de Monaco	Yes	
Montenegro	Kinološki savez Crne Gore	Yes	
Mongolia	Mongolian Kynological Federation	Yes	
Morocco	Société Centrale Canine Marocaine	Yes	
Myanmar	Myanmar Kennel club	Yes	
Nepal	Nepal Kennel Club	Independent	
Netherlands	Raad van Beheer op Kynologisch Gebied in Nederland	Yes	
New Zealand	New Zealand Kennel Club	Yes	
Nicaragua	Asociación Canina Nicaragüense	Yes	
North Macedonia	Kinološki sojuz na Makedonija	Yes	
Norway	Norsk Kennel Klub	Yes	
Norway	Hundeeiernes Klubb	No	
Pakistan	Kennel Club of Pakistan	Yes	
Pakistan	Pakistan Kennel Union	No	
Panama	Club Canino de Panama	Yes	
Papua New Guinea	Papua New Guinea Kennel	Independent	
Paraguay	Paraguay Kennel Club	Yes	
Peru	Kennel Club Peruano	Yes	
Philippines	Philippine Canine Club	Yes	
Poland	Związek Kynologiczny w Polsce	Yes	
Poland	OSPR Kennel Club	Independent	
Portugal	Clube Português de Canicultura	Yes	
Puerto Rico	Federación Canófila de Puerto Rico	Yes	
Romania	Asociația Chinologică Română	Yes	
Russia	Russian Kynological Federation	Yes	
San Marino	Kennel Club San Marino	Yes	
Scotland	Scottish Kennel Club	Independent	
Serbia	Kinološki Savez Srbije	Yes	
Singapore	Singapore Kennel Club	Yes	
Slovakia	Slovenska Kynologicka Jednota	Yes	
Slovenia	Kinološka Zveza Slovenije	Yes	
South Africa	Kennel Union of Southern Africa	Yes	
South Korea	Korean Kennel Federation	Yes	
Spain	Real Sociedad Canina en España	Yes	
Sri Lanka	Ceylon Kennel Club (Established 1899)	Independent	
Sri Lanka	Kennel Association of Sri Lanka	Yes	
Sweden	Svenska Kennelklubben	Yes	
Switzerland	Société Cynologique Suisse	Yes	
Taiwan	Kennel Club of Taiwan	Yes	
Thailand	Kennel Club of Thailand	Yes	
Trinidad and Tobago	The Trinidad and Tobago Kennel Club	Independent	
Trinidad and Tobago	The Independent Kennel Club	No	
Turkey	Cynology Federation of Turkey (KIF)	Yes	
United Kingdom	The Kennel Club	Independent	
United States of America	American Kennel Club	Independent	
United States of America	United Kennel Club	Independent	
United States of American	American Worldwide Kennel Club	Independent	
United States of America	Continental Kennel Club	Independent	
Ukraine	Ukrainian Kennel Union	Yes	
Ukraine	Ukrainian Kennel&Felinological Union	No	
Uruguay	Kennel Club Uruguayo	Yes	
Uzbekistan	Cynological Federation of Uzbekistan	Yes	
Venezuela	Federación Canina de Venezuela	Yes	
Vietnam	Vietnam Kennel Association	Yes	
Zambia	Kennel Association of Zambia	Independent	
Zimbabwe	Zimbabwe Kennel Club	Independent	
