= MKA =

MKA may refer to:

== Companies and organization ==
- Magnusson Klemencic Associates, an American engineering consulting firm
- Majlis Khuddam-ul Ahmadiyya, the young men's branch of the Ahmadiyya Muslim community
- Malaysian Kennel Association (Malay: Persatuan Kenel Anjing Malaysia), a Malaysian dog club
- Mandakini Ki Awaaz, a community radio station in Rudraprayag district, Uttarakhand, India
- Makani Kai Air, a small Hawaiian airline
- Montclair Kimberley Academy, a private school in Montclair, New Jersey, U.S.

== Media ==
- Mario Kart Advance, the Japanese title for the 2001 kart racing video game Mario Kart: Super Circuit
- Mortal Kombat Annihilation, a 1997 American martial arts fantasy film
- Mortal Kombat: Armageddon, a 2006 video game

== Other uses ==
- MACsec Key Agreement Protocol, a protocol for exchanging keys for use in the MACsec network security standard (IEEE 802.1AE)
- Mary-Kate and Ashley Olsen, a twin pair of American actresses and fashion designers
- .mka, the file extension for audio in the Matroska Multimedia Container format, developed by the Matroska project
- Matthew Knight Arena, an arena in Eugene, Oregon, U.S.
- Mustafa Kemal Atatürk (1881–1938), the first president of Turkey
- Milwaukee Airport Railroad Station, a train station in Milwaukee, Wisconsin, U.S., by Amtrak station code
- Miller Municipal Airport, Miller, South Dakota, U.S., by FAA LID
