= KCP =

KCP may refer to:

- Kentavious Caldwell-Pope (born 1993), American basketball player
- Khmer Communist Party, ruling party of Cambodia from 1975 to 1979
- Karnataka College of Percussion, music school in Bangalore, India
- Kennel Club of Pakistan
- Kochi City Police, India
- Kowloon City Plaza, shopping mall in Hong Kong
- Kangleipak Communist Party, political party in Manipur, India
- Karuna Center for Peacebuilding
