= Kruhari =

- Village
- Location within Bosnia and Herzegovina
- Coordinates: 44.769758°N 16.698551°E
- Country: Bosnia and Herzegovina
- Entity: Federation of Bosnia and Herzegovina
- Canton: Una-Sana
- Municipality: Sanski Most

Area
  - Total: 6.61 sq mi (17.11 km^{2})

Population (2013)
  - Total: 163
  - Density: 24.7/sq mi (9.53/km^{2})
- Time zone: UTC+1 (CET)
  - Summer (DST): UTC+2 (CEST)

Kruhari is a village in the municipality of Sanski Most, Federation of Bosnia and Herzegovina, Bosnia and Herzegovina.

== Demographics ==
According to the 2013 census, its population was 163.

Ethnicity in 2013
| Ethnicity | Number | Percentage |
|---|---|---|
| Bosniaks | 69 | 42.3% |
| Croats | 54 | 33.1% |
| Serbs | 37 | 22.7% |
| other/undeclared | 3 | 1.8% |
| Total | 163 | 100% |
