= Husimovci =

- Village
- Location within Bosnia and Herzegovina
- Coordinates: 44.782256°N 16.600278°E
- Country: Bosnia and Herzegovina
- Entity: Federation of Bosnia and Herzegovina
- Canton: Una-Sana
- Municipality: Sanski Most

Area
  - Total: 3.01 sq mi (7.80 km^{2})

Population (2013)
  - Total: 1,310
  - Density: 435/sq mi (168/km^{2})
- Time zone: UTC+1 (CET)
  - Summer (DST): UTC+2 (CEST)

Husimovci is a village in the municipality of Sanski Most, Federation of Bosnia and Herzegovina, Bosnia and Herzegovina.

== Demographics ==
According to the 2013 census, its population was 1,310.

Ethnicity in 2013
Ethnicity	Number	Percentage
Bosniaks	1,265	96.6%
Serbs	30	2.3%
Croats	3	0.2%
other/undeclared	12	0.9%
Total	1,310	100%
