= Karuna Center for Peacebuilding =

US-based non-profit organization

- Founded: 1994
- Type: Non-profit organization exemption status: 501(c)(3)
- Location: Western Massachusetts
- Region served: Global
- Website: karunacenter.org

Karuna Center for Peacebuilding (KCP) is a 501(c)(3) non-profit organization based in Western Massachusetts. The stated mission of KCP is to empower people divided by conflict to develop mutual understanding and to create sustainable peace. The organization was named for the Sanskrit word for compassion. The organization's efforts in facilitating conflict transformation have led to active programs in more than 30 countries.

== History and purpose ==
KCP provides educational training programs in conflict transformation and inter-communal dialogue in communities experiencing deeply rooted conflict. With a focus on relational peacebuilding, KCP facilitators aim to create a context in which shattered communal relations can be healed and programs fostering coexistence can be established and tested. Rather than maintain permanent satellite offices, KCP aims to establish and support locally-led organizations, networks, and processes that continue to work independently to prevent violence and develop mutual understanding in their local context.

KCP was founded in 1994 by Dr. Paula Green, who came to the field of peacebuilding with a background in intergroup relations, counseling psychology, Buddhist meditation, and nonviolence. Dr. Green was a professor Emeritus at the School for International Training Graduate Institute, as well as the founder of the graduate certificate program, Conflict Transformation Across Culture (CONTACT) located on the SIT Vermont campus and in South Asia.

KCP works internationally with in-country partners to lead peacebuilding programs that include violence prevention trainings and dialogue workshops for locally impacted communities. Between 1994 and 2006, KCP staff led programs in conflict transformation in more than 20 countries in the Middle East, Europe, Asia, Africa and America. As of 2025, the organization lists current and previous projects in 32 different countries on its website as well as past transnational or regional programs.

== Programs ==
KCP’s first long-term project took place in Bosnia from 1997-2002, first working with women community leaders and then with educators from Sanski Most and Prijedor in Northern Bosnia, most of whom were survivors of Prijedor concentration camps which were discovered in 1993 by reporter Roy Gutman. In May 1997, KCP received funding for a Sanski Most training program focused on survivors of sexual abuse, incarceration, and war-based trauma. The program was co-implemented with the Women’s Association of Bosnia and Herzegovina. Three years after the program's initiation, in May 2000, KCP funded to implement Project DIACOM, a dialogue program in the Sanski Most and Prijedor. The program was aimed towards “inter-ethnic tolerance and understanding, conflict transformation, and peacebuilding” through educators. This shift collected support from the Seattle-based NGO, Foundation for Community Encouragement.

Project DIACOM was named to signify dialogues and community building in which erstwhile antagonists are led to mend their mutual suspicions and to begin working together. Alumni of this project later developed their own training programs for expanding understanding, trust, and reconciliation between Bosnian Muslims and Serbs, leading to the start of the Center for Peacebuilding in Sanski Most, Bosnia-Herzegovina. In 2018-2020, KCP again partnered with Center for Peacebuilding as well as three other organizations in Bosnia and Herzegovina to lead the Societal Reconciliation and Transformation (STaR) peacebuilding project.

KCP's other past areas of work have included training members of Nepal's Constituent Assembly in collaboration and negotiation skills and engaging community-based peace committees in the Casamance region of Senegal. Other areas of work have included workshops for women leaders in Sudan and South Sudan in partnership with the Hunt Alternatives Fund, and a multi-year program in Northeast Sri Lanka, in partnership with the Sarvodaya Shramadana Movement, that engaged Buddhist, Muslim, Hindu and Christian leaders in joint community projects and reconciliation following the Sri Lankan Civil War. KCP has worked for many years to foster reconciliation and social cohesion following the Rwandan genocide. Activities of KCP’s Healing Our Communities project in Rwanda were included in a discussion of intergroup relations for National Geographic Magazine’s "Race Issue" in April 2018. As of KCP’s 30th anniversary in 2024, the organization’s primary projects operated in Nigeria, Benin, and the United States.

=== Notable impacts by region ===
West Africa

- Nigeria: Since 2019, KCP has worked with local peacebuilding organizations in Nigeria to implement community-based violence prevention programming. The focus of these efforts is on developing the capacity of community members themselves and this has succeeded in reducing violent incidents locally. During the Nigerian national elections in 2023, these initiatives were anecdotally understood to have contributed to a reduction in violence in areas where it was implemented compared to surrounding areas and previous years.

Karuna Center's collaborations in Nigeria established and strengthened security mechanisms at the state government level, including the inauguration of a 46-member statewide early warning and early response committee for conflict prevention within the Zamfara state government in 2024. KCP partnered with Neem Foundation, the Nigerian federal government Institute for Peace and Conflict Resolution (ICPR), and the Nigerian federal government Office of Strategic Preparedness and Resilience (OSPRE) to co-host the National Conference on the Management of Farmer-Herder Relations in Nigeria that brought state and national stakeholders together with representatives from POCI's community work in 2022, 2023, and 2024.

- Benin: From 2023-2025, KCP’s Building Climate and Conflict Resilient Communities project worked with farmers and herders in northern Benin to better anticipate and respond to tensions over land and water use. Its purpose was to prevent escalation of conflict and counter the influence of violent extremism in the area. KCP worked in partnership with the organization l’Association Coexister in Benin to establish local frameworks for dialogue.
- Senegal: KCP led peacebuilding programs in Senegal from 2006 to 2016. In 2014 and 2016, KCP worked to promote a peace process in the Casamance by helping priestesses to intervene with rebel combatants in remote communities. In 2006, KCP began their work with AECOM International in Senegal to support development of a civil society network, Alliance pour la Paix en Casamance, which remains active. In 2010, World Education partnered with KCP to launch training programs for peace advocacy in the region.
- REWARD Program: Between 2015 and 2020, KCP co-implemented Creative Associates International’s Reacting to Early Warning and Response Data program with USAID and Fund for Peace. The program objective was to dually strengthen early warning threat systems to reduce violence in West Africa and support multi-scalar stakeholders in these states to prevent electoral violence. REWARD was signed into agreement by USAID West Africa Mission Director Alexandre Deprez and ECOWAS President Kadre Desire Ouedrogo, with the approval of U.S. Embassy Nigeria Deputy Chief of Mission, Maria Brewer November 19, 2015, in Abuja, Nigeria.
- Partnerships for Peace: From 2016 to 2019, KCP was involved in preventing and countering violent extremism within the West African Sahel, including but not limited to the countries of: Burkina Faso, Niger, Chad, Cameroon, and Mauritania. Karuna Center led a five-month assessment to examine and classify “the existing Countering Violence Extremism (CVE) understanding and capacity of ECOWAS, the Sahel G5 and the national governments of Burkina Faso, Niger, Chad, Cameroon and Mauritania." The program is intended to identify opportunities for strengthening of multi-scalar government and community structures.
- CONTACT Program: When it was realized that peacebuilding programs in West Africa were available exclusively in English, Karuna Center collaborated with Africa Consultants International and World Education to translate the CONTACT program that had been implemented previously in South Asian states.

East Africa

- Rwanda: KCP's Healing Our Communities program, which is a partnership with three Rwandan organizations (Healing and Rebuilding our Communities, Aegis Trust, and Institute of Research and Dialogue for Peace), was highlighted in the April 2018 issue of National Geographic. KCP has led peacebuilding programs in Rwanda since the mid-1990s. From 2002 to 2012, KCP and graduates at the SIT Graduate Institute led field seminars and worked with Gisozi Museum and Proof: Media for Social Justice. This led to the development of a traveling high school exhibit in Rwanda, in 2010, to honor and introduce those who sheltered opposing community members from other ethnicities during the 1994 genocide. During this time KCP authored a conflict assessment for United States Agency for Human Rights and the Rwandan government. After receiving a grant from the Martin-Baro Fund, the Karuna Center held workshops and seminars aimed at social healing. These efforts were done cooperatively with Pro-Femmes Twese Hamwe, a conglomeration of 40 Rwandan NGOs. In 2014, KCP attended the Rwanda Women Parliamentary forum intended to better understand the post-genocide development of the state.

Central Africa

- Central African Republic: As of 2015 KCP became active in the Central African Republic with the intention of mitigating violence before UN Peacekeeping troop arrival. Additionally, KCP collaborated with United States Institute of Peace (UISP) to lead in-depth workshops toward design for the Planning Commission for the Bangui National Forum.

South Asia and Southeast Asia

- Nepal: Karuna Center has worked in Nepal and collaborated with Nepali NGOs since 1996. Beginning in 2010, KCP trained members of parliament in conflict transformation and interest-based negotiation, working with a group of 75 members of the interim parliament to resolve some of the most contentious issues in the way of developing a new constitution. KCP also trained the Asian Development Bank and World Bank in conflict-sensitive development.

North America

- Local Programs: KCP efforts within the local community have been focused on promoting greater inter-religious and inter-cultural understanding and resolving intra-community tensions. From 2022-2024, KCP also worked in area schools to improve violence prevention through efforts focused on belonging and connection.

== Collaborations ==
Karuna Center for Peacebuilding has collaborated with the SIT Graduate Institute in Brattleboro, Vermont, to teach courses in CONTACT (Conflict Transformation Across Cultures), a program that Dr. Paula Green founded in 1997 to provide intensive training and graduate certification in peacebuilding. Karuna Center for Peacebuilding is a member of the Alliance for Peacebuilding.
