= Dževar =

- Village
- Location within Bosnia and Herzegovina
- Coordinates: 44.815239°N 16.626403°E
- Country: Bosnia and Herzegovina
- Entity: Federation of Bosnia and Herzegovina
- Canton: Una-Sana
- Municipality: Sanski Most

Area
  - Total: 2.57 sq mi (6.65 km^{2})

Population (2013)
  - Total: 681
  - Density: 265/sq mi (102/km^{2})
- Time zone: UTC+1 (CET)
  - Summer (DST): UTC+2 (CEST)

Dževar is a village in the municipality of Sanski Most, Federation of Bosnia and Herzegovina, Bosnia and Herzegovina.

== Demographics ==
According to the 2013 census, its population was 681.

Ethnicity in 2013
Ethnicity	Number	Percentage
Bosniaks	607	89.1%
Serbs	5	0.7%
Croats	52	7.6%
other/undeclared	17	2.5%
Total	681	100%
