= Demiševci =

- Village
- Location within Bosnia and Herzegovina
- Coordinates: 44.783347°N 16.611534°E
- Country: Bosnia and Herzegovina
- Entity: Federation of Bosnia and Herzegovina
- Canton: Una-Sana
- Municipality: Sanski Most

Area
  - Total: 0.66 sq mi (1.71 km^{2})

Population (2013)
  - Total: 440
  - Density: 670/sq mi (260/km^{2})
- Time zone: UTC+1 (CET)
  - Summer (DST): UTC+2 (CEST)

Demiševci is a village in the municipality of Sanski Most, Federation of Bosnia and Herzegovina, Bosnia and Herzegovina.

== Demographics ==
According to the 2013 census, its population was 440.

Ethnicity in 2013
Ethnicity	Number	Percentage
Bosniaks	432	98.2%
Serbs	2	0.5%
other/undeclared	6	1.4%
Total	440	100%
