= Okreč =

- Village
- Location within Bosnia and Herzegovina
- Coordinates: 44.814533°N 16.523048°E
- Country: Bosnia and Herzegovina
- Entity: Federation of Bosnia and Herzegovina
- Canton: Una-Sana
- Municipality: Sanski Most

Area
  - Total: 2.77 sq mi (7.18 km^{2})

Population (2013)
  - Total: 1,021
  - Density: 368/sq mi (142/km^{2})
- Time zone: UTC+1 (CET)
  - Summer (DST): UTC+2 (CEST)

Okreč is a village in the municipality of Sanski Most, Federation of Bosnia and Herzegovina, Bosnia and Herzegovina.

== Demographics ==
According to the 2013 census, its population was 1,021.

Ethnicity in 2013
Ethnicity	Number	Percentage
Bosniaks	1,020	99.9%
Croats	1	0.1%
Total	1,021	100%
