= Naprelje =

- Village
- Location within Bosnia and Herzegovina
- Coordinates: 44.782900°N 16.502938°E
- Country: Bosnia and Herzegovina
- Entity: Federation of Bosnia and Herzegovina
- Canton: Una-Sana
- Municipality: Sanski Most

Area
  - Total: 2.15 sq mi (5.57 km^{2})

Population (2013)
  - Total: 605
  - Density: 281/sq mi (109/km^{2})
- Time zone: UTC+1 (CET)
  - Summer (DST): UTC+2 (CEST)

Naprelje is a village in the municipality of Sanski Most, Federation of Bosnia and Herzegovina, Bosnia and Herzegovina.

== Demographics ==
According to the 2013 census, its population was 605.

Ethnicity in 2013
Ethnicity	Number	Percentage
Bosniaks	603	99.7%
other/undeclared	2	0.3%
Total	605	100%
