= Čaplje =

- Village
- Location within Bosnia and Herzegovina
- Coordinates: 44.728314°N 16.682608°E
- Country: Bosnia and Herzegovina
- Entity: Federation of Bosnia and Herzegovina
- Canton: Una-Sana
- Municipality: Sanski Most

Area
  - Total: 2.83 sq mi (7.34 km^{2})

Population (2013)
  - Total: 1,264
  - Density: 446/sq mi (172/km^{2})
- Time zone: UTC+1 (CET)
  - Summer (DST): UTC+2 (CEST)

Čaplje is a village in the municipality of Sanski Most, Federation of Bosnia and Herzegovina, Bosnia and Herzegovina.

== Demographics ==
According to the 2013 census, its population was 1,264.

Ethnicity in 2013
Ethnicity	Number	Percentage
Bosniaks	1248	98.7%
Serbs	7	0.6%
other/undeclared	9	0.7%
Total	1,264	100%
