= Skucani Vakuf =

- Village
- Location within Bosnia and Herzegovina
- Coordinates: 44.788876°N 16.450631°E
- Country: Bosnia and Herzegovina
- Entity: Federation of Bosnia and Herzegovina
- Canton: Una-Sana
- Municipality: Sanski Most

Area
  - Total: 6.28 sq mi (16.27 km^{2})

Population (2013)
  - Total: 1,434
  - Density: 228.3/sq mi (88.14/km^{2})
- Time zone: UTC+1 (CET)
  - Summer (DST): UTC+2 (CEST)

Skucani Vakuf is a village in the municipality of Sanski Most, Federation of Bosnia and Herzegovina, Bosnia and Herzegovina.

== Demographics ==
According to the 2013 census, its population was 1,434.

Ethnicity in 2013
Ethnicity	Number	Percentage
Bosniaks	1,432	99.9%
Serbs	1	0.1%
Croats	1	0.1%
Total	1.434	100%
