= Krkojevci =

- Village
- Location within Bosnia and Herzegovina
- Coordinates: 44.736689°N 16.666946°E
- Country: Bosnia and Herzegovina
- Entity: Federation of Bosnia and Herzegovina
- Canton: Una-Sana
- Municipality: Sanski Most

Area
  - Total: 3.73 sq mi (9.67 km^{2})

Population (2013)
  - Total: 361
  - Density: 96.7/sq mi (37.3/km^{2})
- Time zone: UTC+1 (CET)
  - Summer (DST): UTC+2 (CEST)

Krkojevci is a village in the municipality of Sanski Most, Federation of Bosnia and Herzegovina, Bosnia and Herzegovina.

== Demographics ==
According to the 2013 census, its population was 361.

Ethnicity in 2013
Ethnicity	Number	Percentage
Bosniaks	304	84.2%
Serbs	56	15.5%
Croats	1	0.3%
Total	361	100%
