= Kijevo, Sanski Most =

Kijevo
- Village
- Location within Bosnia and Herzegovina
- Coordinates: 44.7322°N 16.7263°E
- Country: Bosnia and Herzegovina
- Entity: Federation of Bosnia and Herzegovina
- Canton: Una-Sana
- Municipality: Sanski Most

Area
  - Total: 5.59 sq mi (14.47 km^{2})

Population (2013)
  - Total: 682
  - Density: 122/sq mi (47.1/km^{2})
- Time zone: UTC+1 (CET)
  - Summer (DST): UTC+2 (CEST)

Kijevo is a village in the municipality of Sanski Most, Federation of Bosnia and Herzegovina, Bosnia and Herzegovina.

== Demographics ==
According to the 2013 census, its population was 682.

Ethnicity in 2013
Ethnicity	Number	Percentage
Bosniaks	658	96.5%
Croats	13	1.9%
Serbs	3	0.4%
other/undeclared	8	1.2%
Total	682	100%
