= Georgian Shepherd =

Georgian Shepherd Dog
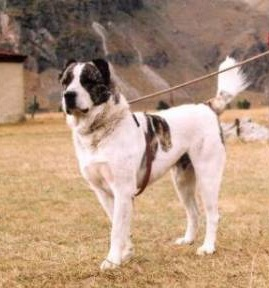
- Georgian Shepherd
- Other names: Georgian Mountain Dog
- Common nicknames: Qartuli Nagazi or Nagazi
- Origin: Georgia
Traits
Height	Males	minimum 65 cm (26 in)
	Females	minimum 60 cm (24 in)
Weight	Males	50 kilograms (110 lb)
	Females	45 kilograms (99 lb)
- Coat: Thick double coat—thick undercoat
- Color: any color, white
- Litter size: 3–10 puppies
Kennel club standards
- Cynological Federation of Georgia: standard
- Notes: National animal of Georgia.

The Georgian Shepherd (Georgian: ქართული ნაგაზი), also known as Georgian Mountain Dog (Georgian: ქართული მთის ძაღლი) or Nagazi, is a breed of guard dog and livestock guardian dog from the Georgian Caucasus.

== Breed history ==
Georgian Shepherd or Nagazi breed is the result of selection done by native people of Georgia. The first representatives of the breed appeared in the north-east of the country. The species originates from Tibetan Mastiff and was used for the multiple daily tasks. The Nagazi accompanied shepherds, helping them to take care of the herds. Their main task was to chase away wolves and bears from the sheep. Georgian Shepherd were also used as guard dogs to protect property. There is a legend that one Nagazi tore a wolf to pieces while protecting younger member of the family.

For a long period of time breeders were not interested in creating a separate breed and continuing the selection process of the Georgian shepherd, the number of Nagazi gradually decreased. The breed was on the verge of extinction. In 2000, the Cynological Federation of Georgia officially adopted a unified breed standard. The description includes distinct breed features and accepted variations. Today, a community of breed enthusiasts is working on the development of the Nagazi, and this herding dog is gradually gaining popularity outside Georgia.

== Description ==
There are two kinds of Georgian livestock guardian dogs: the short haired "Lion" type, typically pure white or white with dark patches on its coat and the long hair "Bear" type are typically dark brown to black head and lighter brown covering the rest of the coat. In Georgia they are known as Qartuli Nagazi. The short hair "Lion" type is considered to the oldest or Aboriginal variant of the breed, with the pure white being the rarest coat color. The "Lion" variant was predominantly found in the north-east regions of Georgia.

Physically, these dogs are strongly-boned, muscular, and athletic, with a large head and powerful legs. The shape of the head of the Georgian mountain dog is almost rectangular, proportional in size to the body. The skull is flat, oblong and deep, the forehead is flat, the occipital protuberance is developed, but hidden behind developed muscles. Superciliary arches are moderate. The nose is wide black or brown with well developed nostrils. The muzzle is wide, shorter than the skull. The neck should be short and powerful.

The Georgian Shepherd Dog is distinguished by a massive large build, moderately stretched format. The musculature is well-developed, without relief. The teeth are white, set close together without gaps. A scissor bite is recognized as normal for this breed, slight deviations are acceptable.

The ears are traditionally cropped. The eyes are of medium size, oval and set deep. Usually dark, but for dogs with white ears and light colors, light shades are acceptable. The Nagazi has a muscular withers, which are well defined and raised above the topline. A straight and wide back with short and powerful loin. The croup is rounded, close to horizontal in position. The ribcage is wide and slightly rounded. The lower chest line is at the level of the elbow. The belly is moderately tucked up. The tail is thick at the base, set high. The movements of the Georgian mountain dog are free, sweeping and balanced. The breed is characterized by a short trot, turning into a heavy gallop when running.

Adult males reach a height of 65 cm at the withers. Bitches are lower, average height is 60 cm. Weight ranges within 50–70 kg. The length of the legs to the elbows is slightly more than half the height. The angle of the humeral scapular joint should be 100 °. Forearms are straight and strong. In the description of the breed, there are no requirements for coat color. The fur of the nagazi is shiny, close to the body, short with a thick undercoat. Increased pile length is acceptable around the area the neck and withers area.

Georgian Shepherds tend to be assertive, brave, and alert.

== Temperament ==
Georgian sheepdog

Character of Georgian sheepdog commonly includes:

- distrust of strangers
- courage
- highly developed protective instinct
- calmness
- confidence in their strength

Outward calmness and slowness are replaced by decisiveness at the first sign of danger. The breed is characterised by a tendency to dominate, therefore, training the Georgian Shepherd requires perseverance and patience from the owner. Learning and socialization should start at an early age. Due to natural endurance, the Georgian mountain dog has increased efficiency as a farm helper. They are not afraid of low temperatures and prolonged exercise. Georgian mountain dogs tend to be suspicious of strangers. The dog looks calm and slow, but makes decisions quickly and reacts fast to any dangerous circumstances. Nagazi is able to assess the level of danger and instinctively protect those who are weaker. Due to these abilities, the breed can be determined as suitable for the watchdog service.

The Georgian Shepherd is a leader by nature, and their character requires a strong-willed owner. They do not typically show aggression towards their family members, and are generally sweet-natured with children. The dog is able to distinguish children from adults and adjust their behaviour and attitude. They take part in the kids' games with pleasure and clearly control their strength. The dog shows great tolerance to children's behaviour and is very gentle with them.

Georgian shepherds can attack animals that they do not consider to be part of the pack. This is also true for dogs living in close proximity. The Georgian shepherd gets along with other domestic animals, including cats and birds. The breed was bred to take care of herds, so does not show aggression towards livestock. Nagazi is likely to start fights questioning leadership with other dogs of any breed. This only happens temporarily and is usually resolved once the relationship between the animals is clarified.

== See also ==
- List of dog breeds
- Armenian Gampr dog
- Caucasian Shepherd Dog
