= East Africa Kennel Club =

Official kennel club of East Africa

- Abbreviation: EAKC
- Formation: 1919; 107 years ago
- Type: Kennel club
- Legal status: Active
- Headquarters: Nairobi
- Region served: East Africa
- Website: eastafricakennelclub.com

The East Africa Kennel Club is the official kennel club of the East African countries of Kenya, Uganda, Tanzania, Rwanda and Burundi.

The East Africa Kennel Club was founded in October 1919 at a dog show held at the old Nairobi Racecourse, this two day event was held in conjunction with the newly formed Agricultural Society (later Royal Agricultural Society) of Kenya, in 1921 the club became officially affiliated with The Kennel Club in the United Kingdom. The club continued to use the old Nairobi Racecourse for their Nairobi shows until the 1950s, in 1954 the club completed construction of purpose-built facilities on the land of the Royal Agricultural Society at Jamhuri Park near the city centre. The club maintains breed registries for purebred dog breeds in East Africa and is responsible for the coordination of dog conformation shows, including their annual championship show at Jamuri Park in Nairobi. Throughout its history the club has organised other dog sports including field trials, obedience trials and sheepdog demonstrations.

Prominent members of the East Africa Kennel Club have included Mary and Louis Leakey, Mary served as the club's secretary for a number of years and in 1959 Louis served as the club's president. The couple and their family frequently exhibited their own Dalmatians at club shows.

== See also ==
- List of kennel clubs
