= Mandakini Ki Awaaz =

- Rudraprayag; India
- Broadcast area: Uttarakhand
- Frequency: 90.8 MHz

Programming
- Languages: Hindi; Garhwali language

History
- First air date: 21 September 2014; 11 years ago

Mandakini Ki Awaaz or MKA 90.8 FM Radio is a community radio station providing FM services to 1098 villages covering approximately 3.5 lakh population of Chamoli, Tehri and Pauri Districts of the Indian state of Uttarakhand. The station was founded in 2001 by Manvendra Negi with narrowcasting radio programs and advocacy for the community radio licence process. This was the first radio station in Rudraprayag, Uttarakhand, situated at Prithvirajnagar (Sena-Garsari) Tehsil Ukhimath and among the first in India to start advocacy for the community radio license process in India.

== History ==
The radio station received approval from the local authority, with license number FMCR-166/1+1SBY issued by the Govt. of India by DOTs Wireless planning & Coordination Wing, New Delhi in 2013. It officially started broadcasting on 21 September 2014 by Manvendra Negi. It was a joint venture of a non-governmental organisation named "Mandakini Ki Awaaz Kalyan Sewa Samiti" and Bangalore-based public trust called "People's Power Collective". This was also the first radio station in Rudraprayag. In 2014, during the inauguration, Negi said—

We began the trial run in middle of August and we were thrilled with the responses. Though we have just began the regular broadcasting, the feedback is encouraging. We are collaborating with the district disaster management department to produce a series of programmes on disaster management.

In September 2015, the radio celebrated its first anniversary. The radio played an important role in sending important messages to local people during natural disasters.
