= Kennel Club of Montenegro =

Dog registration organization

The Kinološki savez Crne Gore, a member of the FCI, is an organization responsible for dog pedigree registration services in Montenegro. The organization also provides training services, judging for conformation shows, and many other services relating to dog showing.
