= Kennel Club of Pakistan =

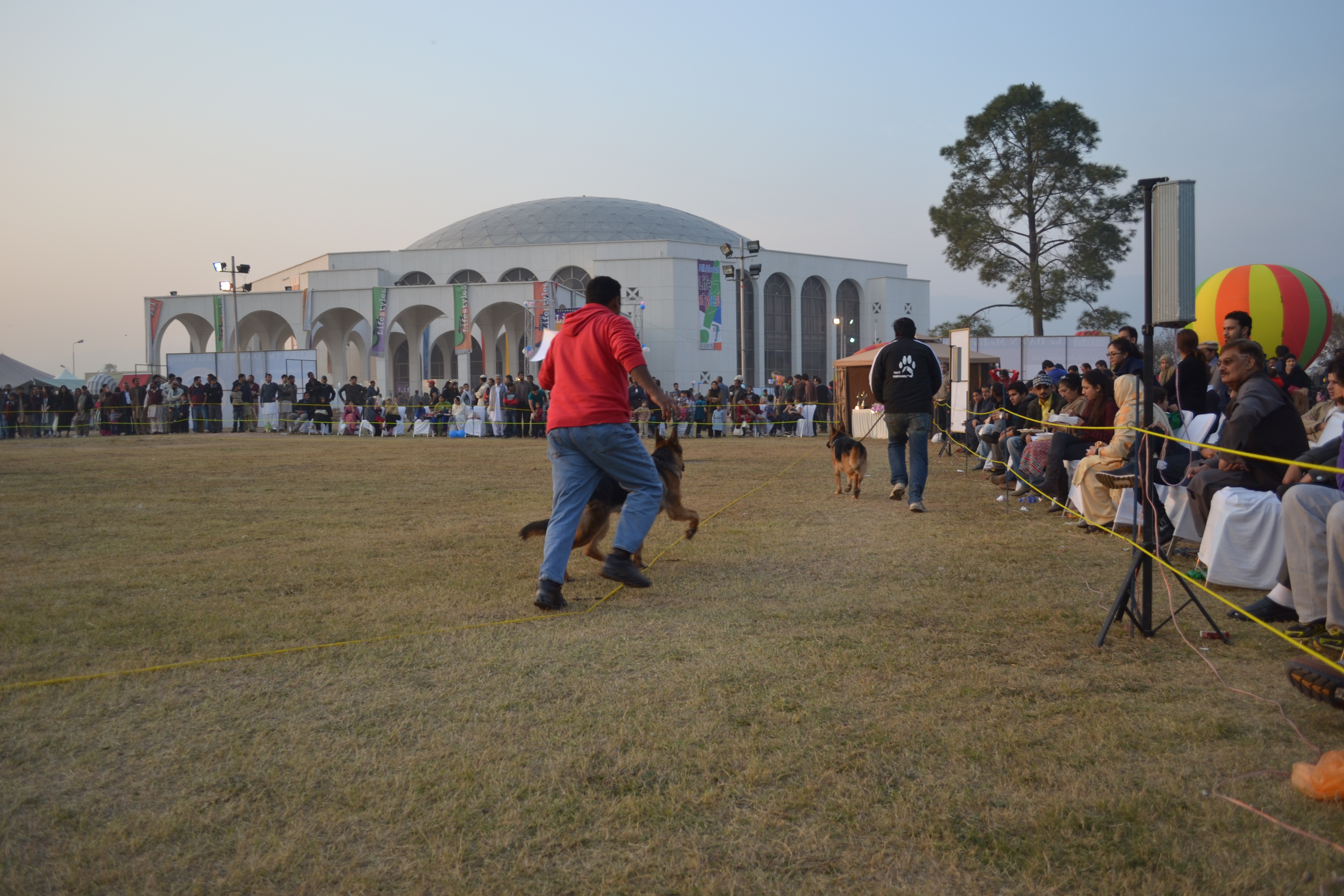
Islamabad Dog Show, Islamabad, Pakistan

The Kennel Club of Pakistan (KCP) is a non-profit kennel club in Pakistan. The organization's main functions are to register pure-bred dogs and to act as governing body for the sport of pure-bred dogs. Its activities include maintenance of pedigree documentation, dog shows, working trials, field trials, obedience classes and tests.

The club has reciprocal arrangements with the American Kennel Club and the Kennel Club of England.

== History ==
The KCP was formed in 1947, and was soon affiliated by the Kennel Club of the United Kingdom. A few years ago, the American Kennel Club made a reciprocal agreement with the KCP. In 2006, the Asia Kennel Union gave the KCP membership.

== Affiliations ==
- Fédération Cynologique Internationale (FCI) – Contract Partner
- The Kennel Club (KC) – Affiliate
- Asian Kennel Union – Member
- American Kennel Club – Reciprocal Arrangement
