= Center for Peacebuilding =

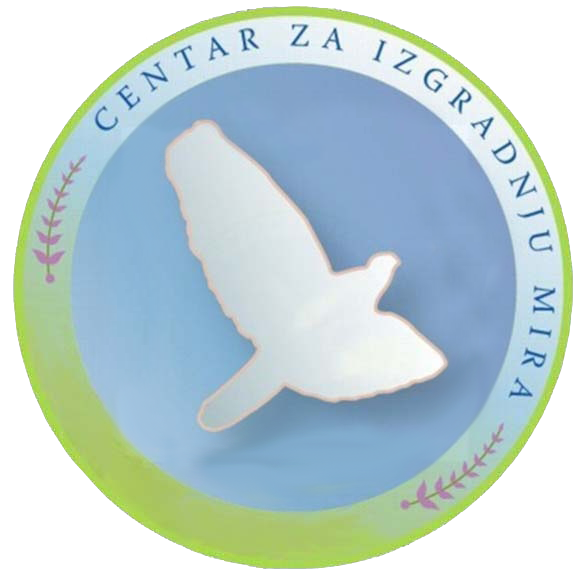
- Type: Non-profit organization
- Location: Sanski Most, Bosnia-Herzegovina
- Region served: Local, national, international
- Website: www.unvocim.net/

Center for Peacebuilding (Centar za Izgradnju Mira, CIM) is a non-governmental organization based in Sanski Most, Una-Sana Canton, Bosnia-Herzegovina. The organization was founded in 2004 to address the ethnic divisions present in Bosnia-Herzegovina.

== History and background ==
While the Dayton Agreement managed to put an end to the Bosnian War and the violence, it froze ethnic divisions. Nationalistic discourse and hate speech are highly practised by political and religious leaders, and fuel hatred and acts of violence towards the "others". Communities are segregated among ethnic and religious lines. Negative stereotypes and prejudices are passed down to the new generations, which have few opportunities to interact with members of other ethnic groups, as they go to ethnically homogeneous schools.

== Projects and activities ==
Since 2004, CIM has organized annual peace camps, where participants are offered the opportunity to engage in dialogue and openly discuss taboo topics related to the conflict. The camps bring together Bosnian individuals of mixed gender, ethnic and religious backgrounds, and train them to become peacebuilders. They learn skills in non-violent communication, active listening, prejudice reduction, and mediation. After peace camps, the participants are required to implement peacebuilding activities in their home communities. The aim of this project is to form a network of young peacebuilders across Bosnia and Herzegovina, who will become leaders, and help build a less segregated society for the new generations.

Rates of violence in primary schools in BiH are very high. A USAID study suggested that 90% of primary school students are exposed to psychological violence, while 60% of them are exposed to physical violence. Every year CIM organizes non-violent communication (NVC) workshops taught in primary schools in the local area. The topics CIM teaches in primary schools are: active listening, expressing emotions without fear, prejudices and stereotypes, addressing fears, and tolerance.

Apart from the NVC, CIM also organizes the Alternatives to Violence Project (AVP) three to four times a year. The AVP program is aimed towards local educators but is open to everybody within the community During the workshop CIM educators uses interactive exercises and role plays to encourage participants to examine how injustice, prejudice, frustration and anger can lead to violence.

CIM organizes regular interreligious dialogue meetings in Sanski Most between the leaders of Christian Orthodox, Catholic, Protestant and Muslim communities which are open to the public. In 2011 CIM organized an International Peace Week event, whose theme focused on interreligious dialogue.

CIM's foreign language program is a popular incentive for the empowerment of youth. Starting with 2011, the center offers classes of English, French, German, Spanish, Turkish, Arabic, and Romanian.

The center also provides craniosacral therapy for adults and youth who have been affected by war trauma.

== International cooperation ==
CIM hosts international delegations coming to Bosnia-Herzegovina to learn about the conflict and participate in peacebuilding. These delegations come from the United States, and Europe.

In Nepal, CIM helped a group of young people led by peacebuilder Phanindra Raj Kharel to establish the Center for Peacebuilding Nepal. CIM is currently in the process of establishing centers in Australia and the US.

Annually, CIM receives two groups from the School for International Training, Vermont, United States who take part in a study visit in the local area. CIM is part of their study abroad program. Through the program CIM hosts students and gives them opportunities for research.

Every year, CIM hosts a Global Youth Connect delegation. The international participants interact with local youth and participate in workshops on conflict transformation.

In the spring of 2011, the organization hosted a group of students from Yale University and organized a short program about local non-governmental organizations in Sanski Most.

In 2011 the director of CIM, Vahidin Omanović, was the recipient of the 5th International Bremen Peace Award. He received the prize of Unknown Peace Worker.
