= Fédération Cynologique Internationale =

International federation of kennel clubs based in Thuin, Belgium

- Abbreviation: FCI
- Formation: 22 May 1911; 115 years ago
- Type: Federation of kennel clubs
- Legal status: Active
- Location: Thuin, Belgium
- Region served: Worldwide (except United States, United Kingdom and Canada)
- Official language: French, English, German, Spanish
- President: Tamás Jakkel
- Main organ: FCI General Committee
- Website: www.fci.be

The Fédération Cynologique Internationale (French for 'international cynological federation', (Note: Unofficially also called the "International Canine Federation") French pronunciation: [fedeʁɑsjɔ̃ sinɔlɔʒik ɛ̃tɛʁnɑsjɔnal]; abbreviated as FCI) is the largest international federation of national kennel clubs and purebred registries. The FCI is based in Thuin, Belgium, and has 98 members and contract partners (one from each country).

It operates worldwide, with the exception of the United States, United Kingdom and Canada, where instead individual agreements between the FCI and their national kennel clubs are in place.

== History ==
The FCI was founded in 1911 under the auspices of the kennel clubs of Austria, Belgium, France, Germany and the Netherlands. Its objective was to bring global uniformity to the breeding, exhibiting and judging of pure-bred dogs. It was disbanded in World War I and recreated in 1921 by Belgium and France. Since its foundation the FCI's membership has grown to include kennel clubs from the majority of countries worldwide, with members in Europe as well as Africa, the Americas, Asia and Oceania.

== Function ==
The purpose of the FCI is to make sure that the pedigrees and judges are mutually recognised by all the FCI member countries. In contrast to national kennel clubs, the FCI is not a registry and does not issue pedigrees to individual dogs, with the issue of pedigrees and record keeping of breeders and breeder addresses the responsibility of the national canine organisations recognised by the FCI.

The FCI recognises 356 breeds, with each breed being considered as the "property" of a specific country, usually based upon the country where the breed has first originated. These breed "owner" countries write the breed standard of the specific breed, with the breed standard being a detailed description of the ideal type of the breed, in partnership with and under the oversight of the Standards and Scientific Commissions of the FCI. The FCI is responsible for publication and maintenance of these breed standards, along with the translation of breed standard into the four working languages of the FCI (English, French, German and Spanish). The FCI breed standards act as the reference for the judges at shows held in the FCI member countries, as well as maintaining the qualification and license of judges in dog shows in FCI member countries. For breeders, the FCI breed standards are used as the reference in their attempt to produce top-quality dogs according to the ideal type as set out by the FCI.

The FCI is considered to the largest kennel club in the world with only Africa and the Middle East poorly represented, partly through the absence of national kennel clubs or purebred registries in countries of these regions. In Europe, only the United Kingdom, Kosovo and Bulgaria are not represented by the FCI. Likewise, in the Americas only the USA and Canada are not members.

The official purebred registries in North America that are not members or contract partners of FCI include the American Kennel Club (AKC), Canadian Kennel Club (CKC) and United Kennel Club (UKC), and in Europe, The Kennel Club (TKC) of the United Kingdom. Despite not being members or associates, the FCI has a long standing agreement (or "Letter of Agreement") for mutual recognition of pedigrees under outlined circumstances, and cooperation between the FCI and the AKC, TKC and the CKC, of the United States, United Kingdom and Canada respectively. In addition, the TKC and the FCI have agreements regarding the mutual recognition of judges. In contrast, the FCI does not recognise the UKC and no agreement is in place.

According to AKC's Denise Flaim, crafting a workable standard is a challenge, and the "FCI standards typically have a greater number of disqualifications, which are sometimes subjective, and their impact on a dog's career is not as dire." In contrast, the FCI takes a stronger line on certain issues compared with some non-member national kennel clubs, particularly the AKC and UKC, regarding general animal health and welfare. Unlike the AKC and UKC, the FCI has moved towards banning the practices of ear cropping and tail docking in breed standards, as well as forbidding the entry of dogs with cropped ears and dock tails from being shown in dogs shows in FCI member countries. In addition, the FCI takes a stronger stance on improving the health of dogs as opposed to the appearance of dogs in situations where a breed's health is impacted due to severely restricted gene pools, or concerning brachycephalic obstructive airway syndrome.

== Breeds ==
The FCI automatically recognises all registered breeds recognised by any of its member kennel clubs; therefore its list of recognised dog breeds includes breeds not known outside of their country of origin. The FCI divides the breeds it recognises into ten groups based on various discriminators such as appearance or role:

1. Sheepdogs and cattle dogs (except Swiss cattle dogs)
2. Pinschers and schnauzers - molossoid breeds - Swiss mountain and cattle dogs and other breeds
3. Terriers
4. Dachshunds
5. Spitz and primitive types
6. Scenthounds and related breeds
7. Pointers and setters
8. Retrievers - flushing dogs - water dogs
9. Companion and toy dogs
10. Sighthounds

== FCI members ==
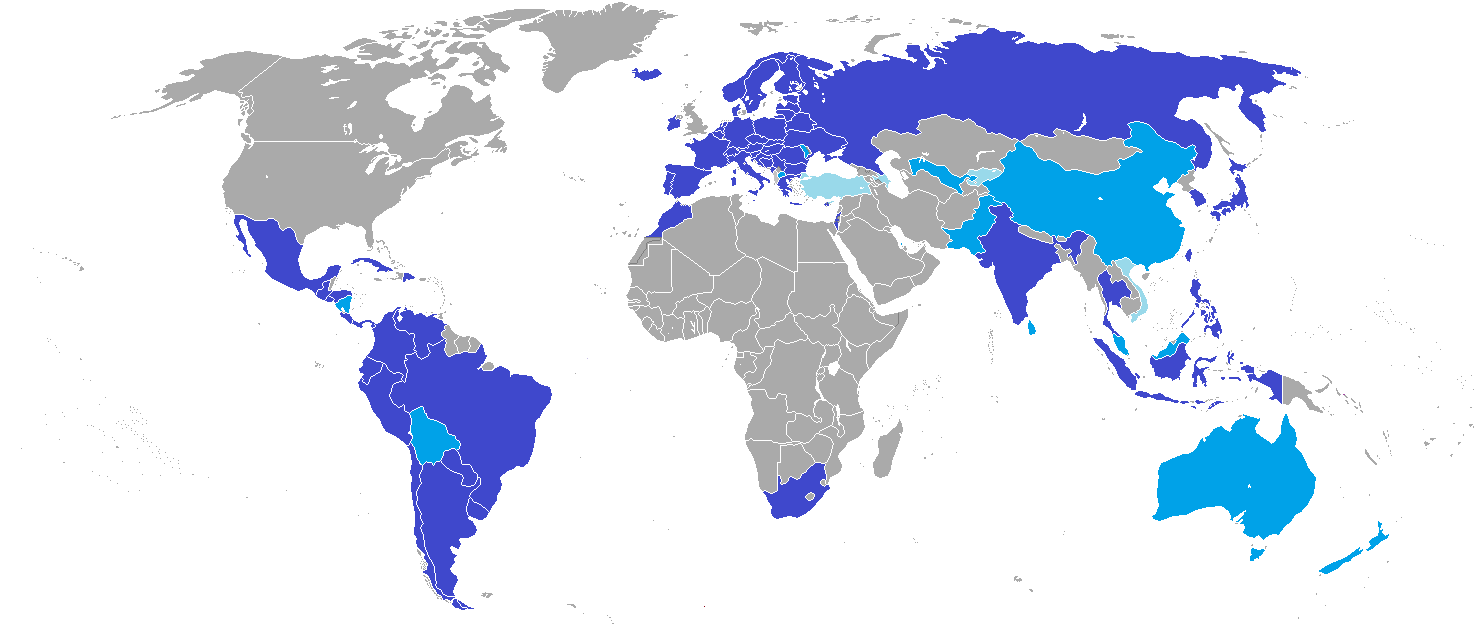
FCI member states

The FCI has members, associates and partners in 98 countries.

Country	Member club's name
Argentina	Federación Cinológica Argentina
Armenia	Armenian Dog-Lovers' Association
Australia	Australian National Kennel Council
Austria	Österreichische Kynologenverband
Azerbaijan	Kennel Union of the Republic of Azerbaijan
Bahrain	Bahrain Kennel Club
Belarus	Belarusian Cynological Union
Belgium	Union Royale Cynologique Saint Hubert
Bolivia	Kennel Club Boliviano
Bosnia and Herzegovina	Kinološki Savez u Bosni i Hercegovini
Brazil	Confederação Brasileira de Cinofilia
Bulgaria	Bulgarian Republican Federation of Cynology
Chile	Kennel Club de Chile
China	China Kennel Union
Colombia	Asociación Club Canino Colombiano
Costa Rica	Asociación Canófila Costarricense
Croatia	Hrvatski Kinoloski Savez
Cuba	Federación Cinólogica de Cuba
Cyprus	Cyprus Kennel Club
Czech Republic	Českomoravská kynologická unie
Denmark	Dansk Kennel Club
Dominican Republic	Federación Canina Dominicana
Ecuador	Asociación Ecuatoriana de Registros Caninos
Egypt	Egyptian Kennel Federation
El Salvador	Asociación Canófila Salvadoreña
Estonia	Eesti Kennelliit
Finland	Suomen Kennelliitto
France	Société Centrale Canine
Georgia	Fédération Cynologique de Géorgie
Germany	Verband für das Deutsche Hundewesen
Gibraltar	Gibraltar Kennel Club
Greece	Kennel Club of Greece
Guatemala	Asociación Canófila Guatemalteca
Honduras	Asociación Canófila de Honduras
Hungary	Magyar Ebtenyésztők Országos Egyesülete
Iceland	Hundaræktarfélags Íslands
India	Kennel Club of India
Indonesia	PERKIN Perkumpulan Kinologi Indonesia
Ireland	Irish Kennel Club
Israel	Israel Kennel Club
Italy	Ente Nazionale della Cinofilia Italiana
Japan	Japan Kennel Club
Kazakhstan	Union of Cynologists of Kazakhstan
Kyrgyzstan	Union of Cynologists of Kyrgyz Republic
Latvia	Latvijas Kinologiska Federacija
Lithuania	Lietuvos kinologų draugija
Luxembourg	Fédération Cynologique Luxembourgeoise
Macedonia	Kennel Association of Republic of Macedonia
Malaysia	Malaysian Kennel Association
Malta	Malta Kennel Club
Mexico	Federación Canófila Mexicana
Moldova	Uniunea Chinologică din Moldova
Monaco	Société Canine de Monaco
Montenegro	Kinološki savez Crne Gore
Morocco	Société Centrale Canine Marocaine
Netherlands	Raad van Beheer op Kynologisch Gebied in Nederland
New Zealand	New Zealand Kennel Club
Nicaragua	Asociación Canina Nicaragüense
Norway	Norsk Kennel Klub
Pakistan	Kennel Club of Pakistan
Panama	Club Canino de Panama
Paraguay	Paraguay Kennel Club
Peru	Kennel Club Peruano
Philippines	Philippine Canine Club
Poland	Związek Kynologiczny w Polsce
Portugal	Clube Português de Canicultura
Puerto Rico	Federación Canófila de Puerto Rico
Romania	Asociația Chinologică Română
Russia	Russian Kynological Federation
San Marino	Kennel Club San Marino
Serbia	Kinološki savez Srbije
Singapore	Singapore Kennel Club
Slovakia	Slovenská kynologická jednota
Slovenia	Kinološka Zveza Slovenije
South Africa	Kennel Union of Southern Africa
South Korea	Korea Kennel Federation
Spain	Real Sociedad Canina en España
Sri Lanka	Kennel Association of Sri Lanka
Sudan	Sudanese Kennel Club Association
Sweden	Svenska Kennelklubben
Switzerland	Société Cynologique Suisse
Taiwan	Kennel Club of Taiwan
Thailand	The Kennel Association of Thailand
Turkey	Köpek Irklari ve Kinoloji Federasyonu
Ukraine	Ukrainian Kennel Union
Uruguay	Kennel Club Uruguayo
Uzbekistan	Kynological Federation of Uzbekistan
Venezuela	Federación Canina de Venezuela
Vietnam	Vietnam Kennel Association

== FCI partners ==
Country	FCI partner	Agreement
Canada	Canadian Kennel Club (CKC)	1 April 2009
United Kingdom	The Kennel Club (KC)	1 May 2017
United States	American Kennel Club (AKC)	5 November 2005

== See also ==
- Cynology
