= Malaysian Kennel Association =

Malaysian Kennel Association (MKA) Persatuan Kenel Anjing Malaysia
- Abbreviation: MKA
- Formation: 1925
- Legal status: Active
- Location: Kuala Lumpur, Malaysia
- Region served: Malaysia
- Members: Fédération Cynologique Internationale
- President: Mr. Ken Chuah
- Vice-President: Mr. Derrick Seow Past President Gopi Krishnan
- Affiliations: American Kennel Club; The Kennel Club
- Website: www.dogsmalaysia.my

Malaysian Kennel Association (MKA; Malay: Persatuan Kenel Anjing Malaysia) is a registrar association of purebred dogs in Malaysia that was inaugurated in 1925. The association promotes breeding and exhibition of purebred dogs and formulation of dog show rules. The MKA acts as a dog club for dog lovers. It is the only dog club in Malaysia that is affiliated and has reciprocal agreements with the following international leading canine bodies; the Fédération Cynologique Internationale, the, American Kennel Club, and The Kennel Club.

Their mission is: "MKA further aspires to be the most effective representative body in the country to protect the rights of owners and dogs. MKA is also determined to eradicate the fraudulent use of pedigree and safeguard the pureness of the genetic pool."
