= Cynological Federation of Georgia =

Kynological Federation of Georgia
- Abbreviation: FCG
- Formation: 1991
- Legal status: Active
- Location: Tbilisi, Georgia
- Region served: Georgia, Caucasus
- Members: Fédération Cynologique Internationale
- Official language: Georgian, Russian, English
- President: Mr. Gia Giorgadze
- General Secretary: Mr. Zaza Omarov
- Affiliations: A range of national kennel clubs
- Website: www.fcg.ge/eng/

Fédération Cynologique de Géorgie (also FCG) is the national kennel club of Georgia. The FCG is the only kennel organization in Georgia officially recognized by Fédération Cynologique Internationale (FCI). FCG liaises with other canine clubs, holds shows, and helps to promote dog breeds.

Cynology refers to the study of dogs, usually by enthusiasts and breeders. It is not a recognized scientific discipline in English-speaking countries. It is the source of the English word cynic, which is directly related to canines. In English, the organization is Kynological Federation of Georgia (KFG), but it is more frequently referred to by its French name and uses the initials FCG.

== History ==
Georgian cynology obtained an official status in 1991 when the FCG was founded. In 1997 the FCG joined the Fédération Cynologique Internationale as a contract partner. From 2001 the FCG became an associated FCI member.

From the day of its creation FCG has played a noticeable role in European cynology, and holds close business liaisons with canine organisations from multiple European countries. The FCG regularly holds both National and International (CAC, CACIB) single- and all-breed dog shows; supports and promotes multiple Georgian dog clubs, communities and kennels; actively popularizes such national breeds as Caucasian Shepherd Dog and Georgian mountain dog.

At present the FCG is the only kennel club in Georgia officially recognized by Fédération Cynologique Internationale.

== Experts ==
Expert	Judge List
Mr. Gia Giorgadze	Kavkazskaia Ovtcharka, Sredneaziatskaia Ovtcharka
Mr. Zaza Omarov	All Groups, All Breeds, Best in Show
Mr. Zaza Asanishvili	Breeds
Mr. George Schogol	All Groups, All Breeds, Best in Show
Mrs. Ludmila Batsikadze	Group IV (All Breeds), Basset Hound
Mrs. Victoria Gaidarova	Breeds
Mrs. Natalia Mestvirishvili	Breeds
Mr. Giorgi Chulukhadze	Breeds
Mr. Guram Tsintsadze	Kavkazskaia Ovtcharka
Mr. Temuri Tsagareishvili	Kavkazskaia Ovtcharka
Mrs. Inna Rukhadze	Breeds

== Clubs ==
- Caucasian Shepherd Dog Club ‘BOMBORA’
- Georgian United Kennel Club
- Club ‘LORDLAMARI’
- Club ‘ELITA’
- Central Kennel Club
- Club ‘PRESTIGE’
- Club ‘KENNEL LAND’
- Club 'TOBE'
- Georgian Pointer Club
- Adjara Kennel Federation

(More about FCG Clubs...)

== Commissions ==
- Show Commission
- Qualification Commission
- Breeds Commission
- Working and Sports Commission

(More about FCG Commissions...)

== Senior Management ==
- Mr. Gia Giorgadze, President
- Mr. Zaza Omarov, General Secretary
