= Sanski Most =

- Town and municipality
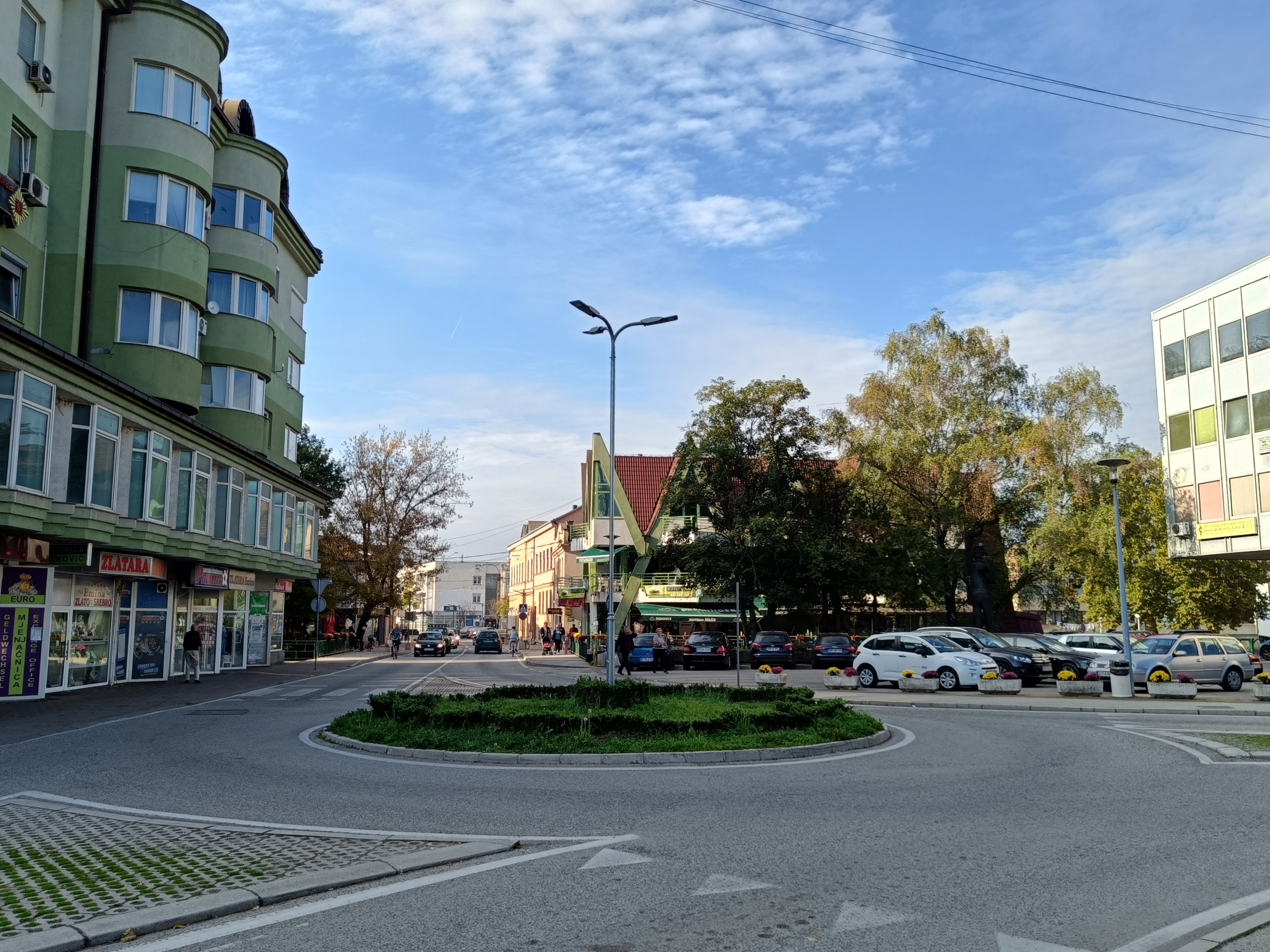
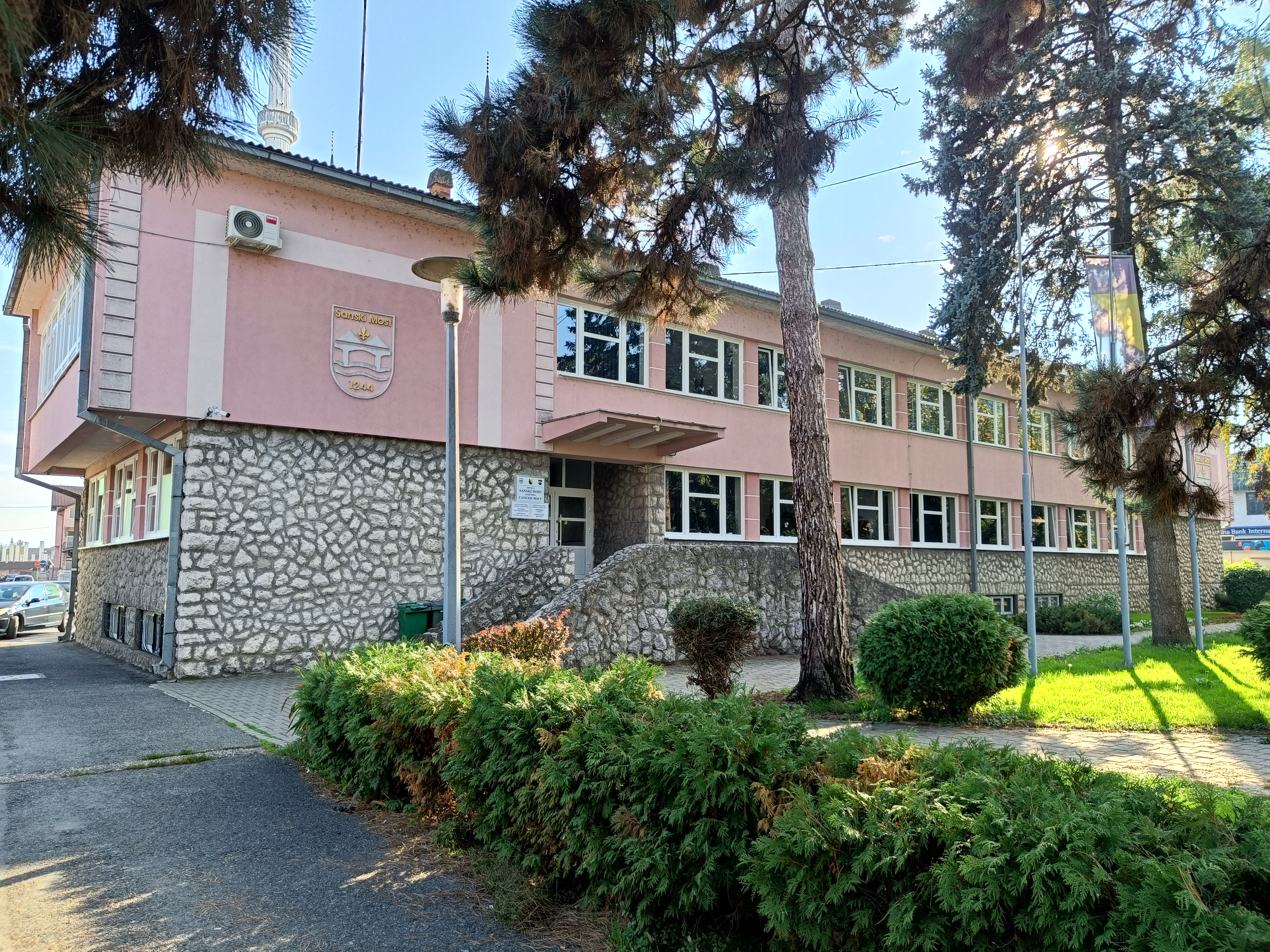
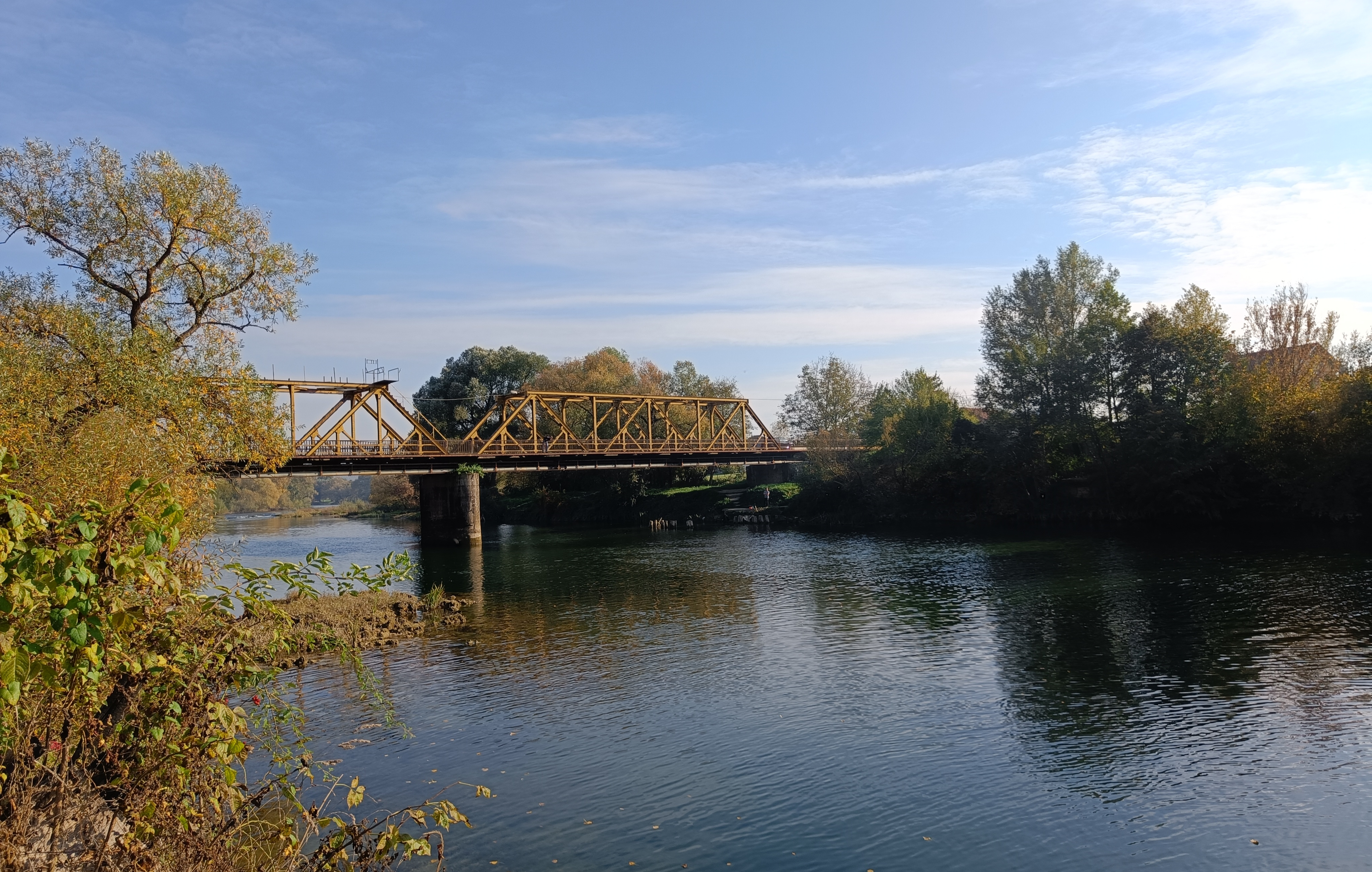
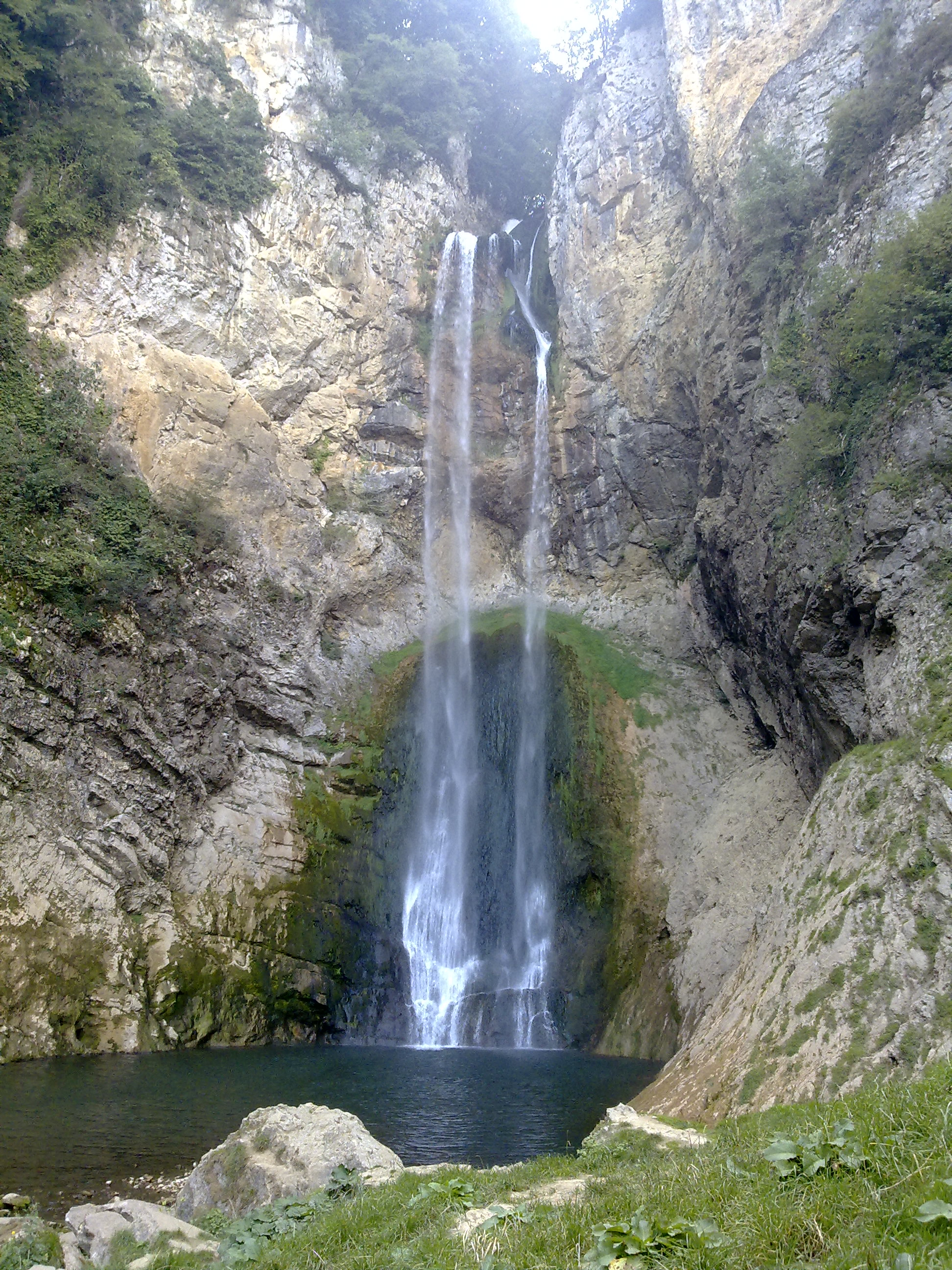
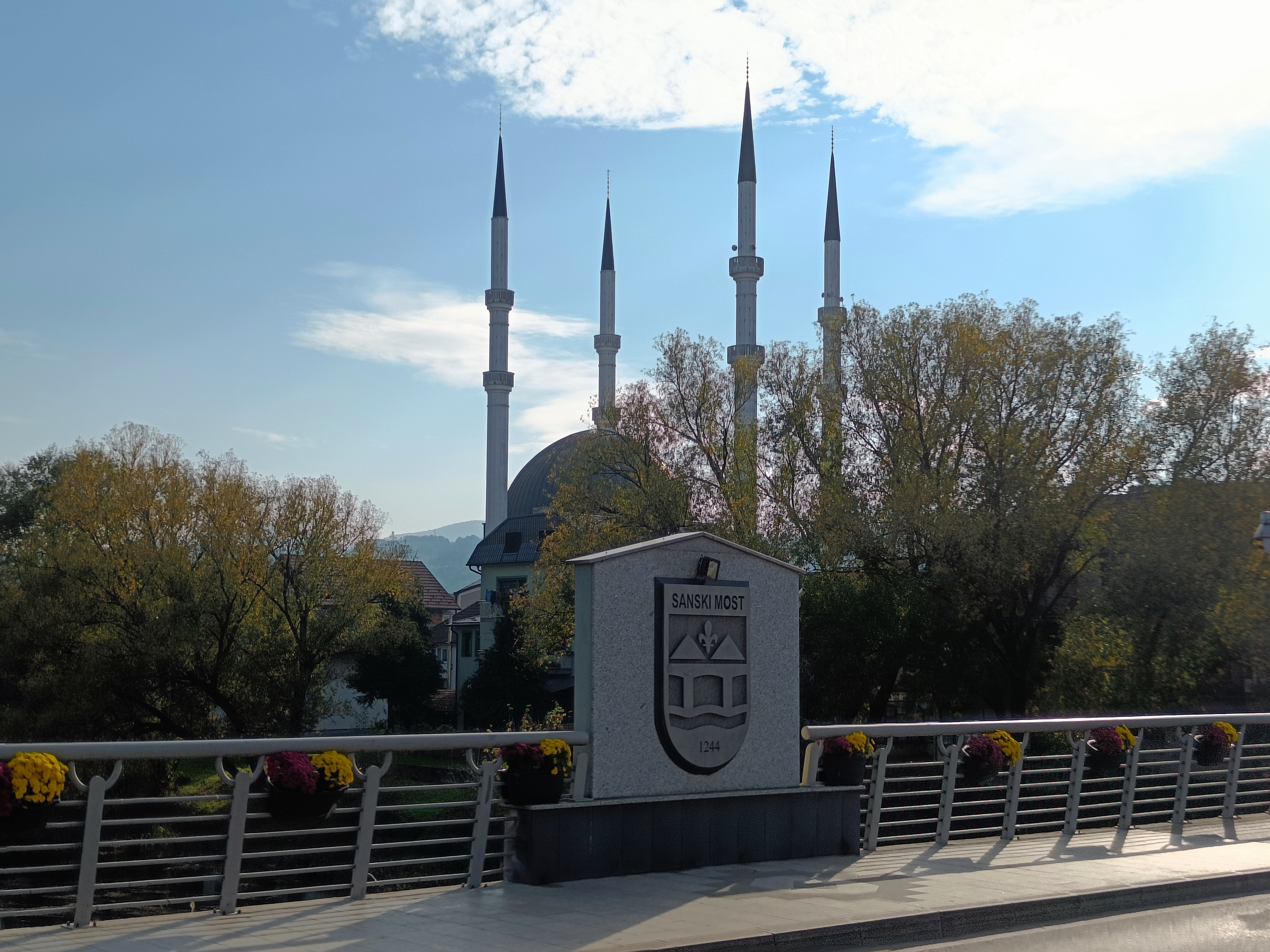

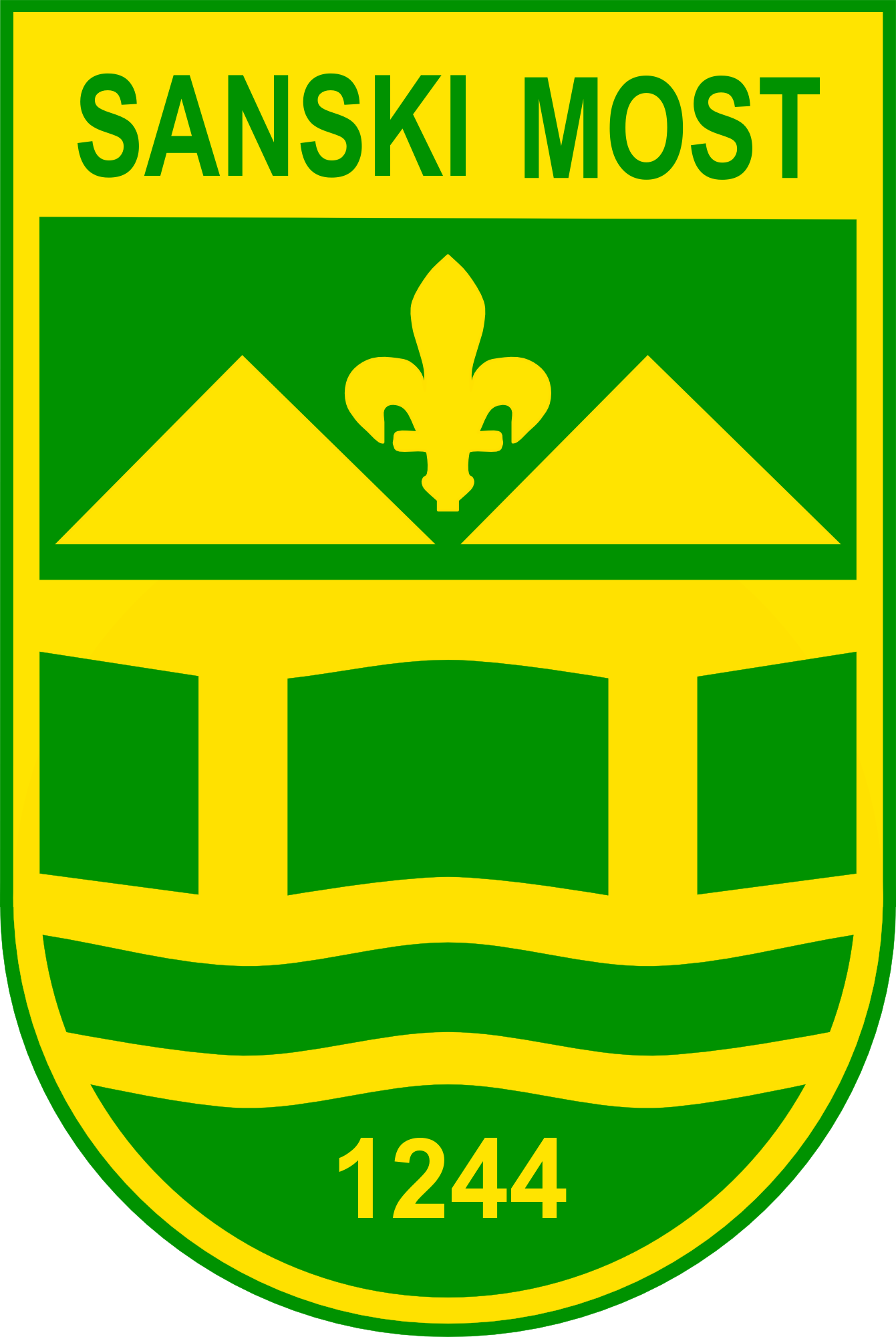
- Flag Coat of arms

- Location of Sanski Most
- Coordinates: 44°46′N 16°40′E
- Country: Bosnia and Herzegovina
- Entity: Federation of Bosnia and Herzegovina
- Canton: Una-Sana
- Geographical region: Bosanska Krajina
- Subdivisions: 75

Government
  - Municipal mayor: Mensur Seferović (SDA)

Area
  - Town and municipality: 781 km^{2} (302 sq mi)

Population (2013 Census)
  - Town and municipality: 41,475
  - Density: 53.1/km^{2} (138/sq mi)
  - Urban: 16,913
  - Rural: 24,562
- Time zone: UTC+1 (CET)
  - Summer (DST): UTC+2 (CEST)
- Area code: +387 37
- Website: www.sanskimost.gov.ba

Sanski Most (pronounced [sâːnskiː mɔ̂ːst]) is a town and municipality located in the Una-Sana Canton of the Federation of Bosnia and Herzegovina, an entity of Bosnia and Herzegovina. It is situated on the banks of the Sana River in northwestern Bosnia and Herzegovina, in the region of Bosanska Krajina, between Prijedor and Ključ. As of 2013, it has a population of 41,475 inhabitants.

== Geography ==
It is located on the Sana River in Bosanska Krajina, between Prijedor and Ključ. Administratively it is part of the Una-Sana Canton of the Federation of Bosnia and Herzegovina. The Town sits on Nine Rivers, and they are : Sana, Dabar, Zdena, Bliha, Majdanska Rijeka, Japra, Sasinka and Kozica

=== Climate ===
Climate data for Sanski Most (1991–2020)
Month	Jan	Feb	Mar	Apr	May	Jun	Jul	Aug	Sep	Oct	Nov	Dec	Year
Record high °C (°F)	20.2 (68.4)	24.7 (76.5)	29.2 (84.6)	30.9 (87.6)	34.5 (94.1)	36.6 (97.9)	39.7 (103.5)	40.0 (104.0)	37.5 (99.5)	30.2 (86.4)	26.4 (79.5)	22.7 (72.9)	40.0 (104.0)
Mean daily maximum °C (°F)	5.5 (41.9)	8.5 (47.3)	13.6 (56.5)	18.5 (65.3)	22.8 (73.0)	26.6 (79.9)	28.7 (83.7)	28.9 (84.0)	23.2 (73.8)	18.0 (64.4)	12.0 (53.6)	6.0 (42.8)	17.7 (63.9)
Daily mean °C (°F)	0.8 (33.4)	2.4 (36.3)	6.7 (44.1)	11.3 (52.3)	15.7 (60.3)	19.7 (67.5)	21.3 (70.3)	20.8 (69.4)	15.8 (60.4)	11.3 (52.3)	6.6 (43.9)	1.7 (35.1)	11.2 (52.2)
Mean daily minimum °C (°F)	−3.1 (26.4)	−2.5 (27.5)	0.9 (33.6)	4.9 (40.8)	9.2 (48.6)	13.0 (55.4)	14.4 (57.9)	14.3 (57.7)	10.4 (50.7)	6.5 (43.7)	2.5 (36.5)	−1.8 (28.8)	5.7 (42.3)
Record low °C (°F)	−26.4 (−15.5)	−25.2 (−13.4)	−20.4 (−4.7)	−6.3 (20.7)	−1.6 (29.1)	0.5 (32.9)	4.5 (40.1)	4.0 (39.2)	−0.6 (30.9)	−6.8 (19.8)	−10.4 (13.3)	−21.4 (−6.5)	−26.4 (−15.5)
Average precipitation mm (inches)	71.7 (2.82)	73.2 (2.88)	75.1 (2.96)	90.8 (3.57)	101.7 (4.00)	101.5 (4.00)	75.3 (2.96)	68.2 (2.69)	117.7 (4.63)	99.2 (3.91)	94.3 (3.71)	93.5 (3.68)	1,062.1 (41.81)
Average precipitation days (≥ 1.0 mm)	8.8	9.1	9.0	10.4	10.3	9.5	7.7	6.9	9.3	8.9	9.8	10.3	109.9
Mean monthly sunshine hours	74.3	99.7	148.8	179.7	224.5	250.7	290.8	267.7	173.7	130.8	78.8	62.5	1,981.9
Source: NOAA

== History ==
In 1878, the little town (varošica) of Sanski Most was described as having a majority Bosnian Muslim population by the Croatian historian Vjekoslav Klaić. From 1929 to 1941, Sanski Most was part of the Vrbas Banovina of the Kingdom of Yugoslavia.

During World War II, it was part of the Axis Independent State of Croatia (NDH), where the fascist Ustaše regime committed the Genocide of the Serbs and the Holocaust. At the beginning of May 1941 in several villages southeast of Sanski Most (Kijevo, Tramošnja, Kozica, etc.) the first armed conflict between the Ustaše and insurgent Serbs occurred. The event is known as the Đurđevdan uprising. In August 1941 on the Eastern Orthodox Elijah's holy day, who is the patron saint of Bosnia and Herzegovina, between 2,800 and 5,500 Serb civilians from Sanski Most and the surrounding area were killed by the Ustaše and thrown into pits which had been dug by the victims themselves. The State Anti-fascist Council for the National Liberation of Bosnia and Herzegovina (ZAVNOBiH) held its second meeting from 30 June to 2 July 1944 in the town; it declared the equality of Muslims (Bosniaks), Serbs and Croats.

When the German and Italian Zones of Influence were revised on 24 June 1942, Sanski Most fell in Zone III, administered civilly by Croatia and militarily by Croatia and Germany.

During the onset of the Bosnian War, the town was captured by the Army of Republika Srpska (Bosnian Serbs) and remained under its control until October 1995 when the Bosnian Army captured it during Operation Sana shortly before the end of the war. The Bosniaks and other non-Serbs were sent to large ethnic cleansing during its control by the Army of Republika Srpska (VRS). Following its capture by the Bosnian Army in October 1995, many Serbs from Sanski Most and Bosniaks from Prijedor exchanged homes due to their refugee status and the opposing federations.

=== Vrhpolje Bridge Massacre ===
On 31 May 1992, the Army of Republika Srpska committed a massacre of 19 Muslim civilians on the Vrhpolje bridge in the Sanski Most municipality. 16 Muslim civilians were beaten on the bridge whilst the Bosnian Serb soldiers insulted them. The VRS had already murdered four on the way to the bridge. The Bosnian Serbs had ordered the Muslim civilians to remove most of their clothes, including their shoes, and then jump off the bridge. The Bosnian Serb soldiers played a game in which they would attempt to shoot the Muslim civilians mid-air whilst they were falling into the water. There was only one survivor of the massacre, Rajif Begić, who later testified against Ratko Mladić. According to the ICTY trial, Ratko Mladić was responsible for the murder of the Muslim civilians, which the court found was a deliberate attempt to ethnically cleanse the Serb-controlled parts of Bosnia and Herzegovina of their Muslim population in order to create a homogenously Serb ethno-state. According to Begić's testimony, the VRS had to kill 70 Muslims that day because "seven Serb soldiers had been killed in that area." Branko Basara, the retired commander of the 6th Krajina Brigade, was also indicted by the ICTY for war crimes that he committed in the Prijedor and Sanski Most area during 1992. Jadranko Palija, a Bosnian Serb soldier responsible for the massacre, was convicted of war crimes by the State Court of Bosnia and Herzegovina in 2007.

In 1996, Serb-inhabited Oštra Luka was split from Sanski Most and ceded to the Republika Srpska entity.

On August 21, 2024 a man opened fire at the Sanski Most Gymnasium secondary school with an automatic rifle, killing three people.

== Demographics ==
=== Population ===
Population of settlements – Sanski Most municipality
	Settlement	1961.	1971.	1981.	1991.	2013.
	Total	39,483	62,102	62,467	60,307	50,421
1	Brdari				539	443
2	Čaplje				1,420	1,264
3	Demiševci				498	440
4	Donji Kamengrad				2,344	2,336
5	Dževar				685	681
6	Fajtovci				369	362
7	Gorice				644	615
8	Gornji Kamengrad				1,387	1,311
9	Hrustovo				1,694	1,697
10	Husimovci				1,802	1,310
11	Kijevo				1,118	682
12	Krkojevci				304	361
13	Lukavice				606	486
14	Lušci Palanka				1,079	226
15	Modra				578	595
16	Naprelje				822	605
17	Okreč				1,104	1,021
18	Podbriježje				570	529
19	Podlug				650	550
20	Podvidača				679	275
21	Poljak				522	483
22	Sanski Most		8,682	14,027	17,144	19,745
23	Sasina				1,054	294
24	Šehovci				960	880
25	Skucani Vakuf				1,321	1,434
26	Stari Majdan				1,212	762
27	Tomina				1,513	1,107
28	Trnova				978	783
29	Vrhpolje				1,840	2,035

=== Ethnic composition ===
Ethnic composition – Sanski Most town
	2013.	1991.	1981.	1971.
Total	19,745 (100,0%)	17,144 (100,0%)	14,027 (100,0%)	8,682 (100,0%)
Bosniaks	15,930 (94,19%)	7,245 (42,26%)	6,067 (43,25%)	4,545 (52,34%)
Serbs	401 (2,37%)	7,831 (45,68%)	5,691 (40,57%)	3,410 (39,27%)
Croats	177 (1,05%)	646 (3,768%)	523 (3,729%)	558 (6,42%)
Others	405 (2,39%)	521 (3,039%)	242 (1,725%)	73 (0,84%)
Yugoslavs		901 (5,255%)	1,504 (10,72%)	96 (1,10%)

Ethnic composition – Sanski Most municipality
	2013.	1991.	1981.	1971.	1961.
Total	50,421 (100,0%)	60,307 (100,0%)	62,467 (100,0%)	62,102 (100,0%)	39,483 (100,0%)
Bosniaks	38,344 (92,45%)	28,136 (46,65%)	27,083 (43,36%)	24,839 (40,00%)	12,350 (31.28%)
Serbs	1,837 (4,429%)	25,363 (42,06%)	26,619 (42,61%)	30,422 (48,99%)	19,156 (48.52%)
Croats	722 (1,741%)	4,322 (7,167%)	5,314 (8,507%)	6,307 (10,16%)	4,844 (12.27%)
Others	572 (1,379%)	1,239 (2,054%)	336 (0,538%)	213 (0,343%)	
Yugoslavs		1,247 (2,068%)	2,936 (4,700%)	195 (0,314%)	3,014 (7.63%)
Roma			75 (0,120%)	12 (0,019%)	
Montenegrins			50 (0,080%)	59 (0,095%)	
Albanians			26 (0,042%)	22 (0,035%)	
Slovenes			16 (0,026%)	23 (0,037%)	
Macedonians			10 (0,016%)	8 (0,013%)	
Hungarians			2 (0,003%)	2 (0,003%)	

== Economy ==
Employment	Male	Female	Total	Total Population	Unemployment %
2014	3,384	1,363	4,747	50,421	53.91%

There are several non-governmental organisations in Sanski Most. The Center for Peacebuilding (in the local language "Centar za Izgradnju Mira (CIM)) has been active in the town since 2004. The "Fenix Center" provides humanitarian aid to people in need in the local community. The organisation "Krajiška Suza" provides care in medical, social, psychological, cultural and existential needs of people living in and around Sanski Most. Austrian manufacturer of exhaust pipes Remus has a manufacturing facility in Sanski Most that employs around 300 people. Sanski Most was selected as one of the most successful local communities within the UNDP project that was financed by the Swiss embassy.

== Sports ==
The football club of the town is NK Podgrmeč.

== Notable people ==
- Mehmed Alagić, general
- Milan Vukić, chess grandmaster
- Anna Ibrišagić, Swedish politician
- Enver Redžić, historian
- Kemal Malovčić, singer
- Milenko Zorić, Serbian sprint canoer, silver medalist at the 2016 Summer Olympics, World and European champion
- Vukašin Brajić, singer
- Milka Milinković, Paralympic track and field athlete, Croatia's most successful Paralympian

== Gallery ==
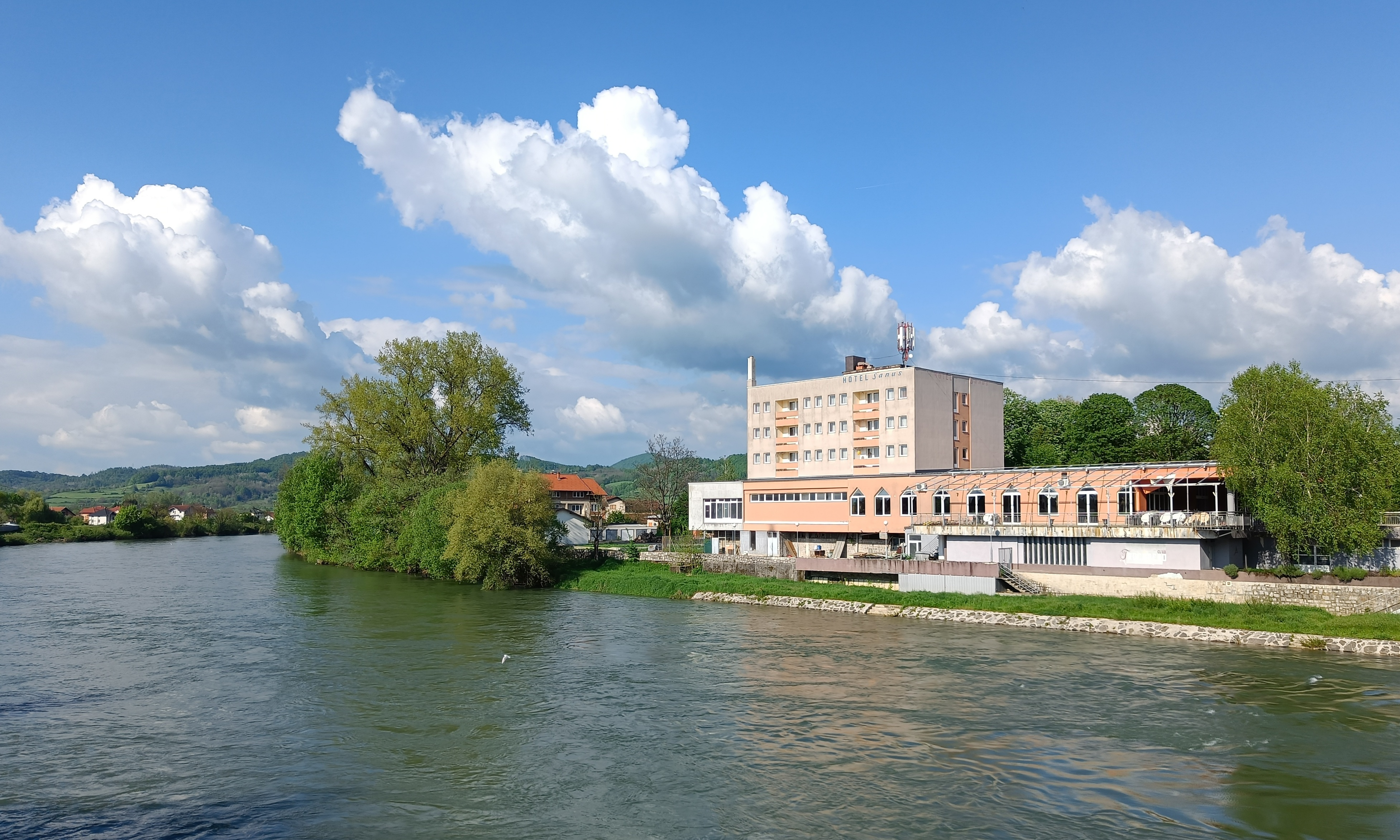
The Sana river

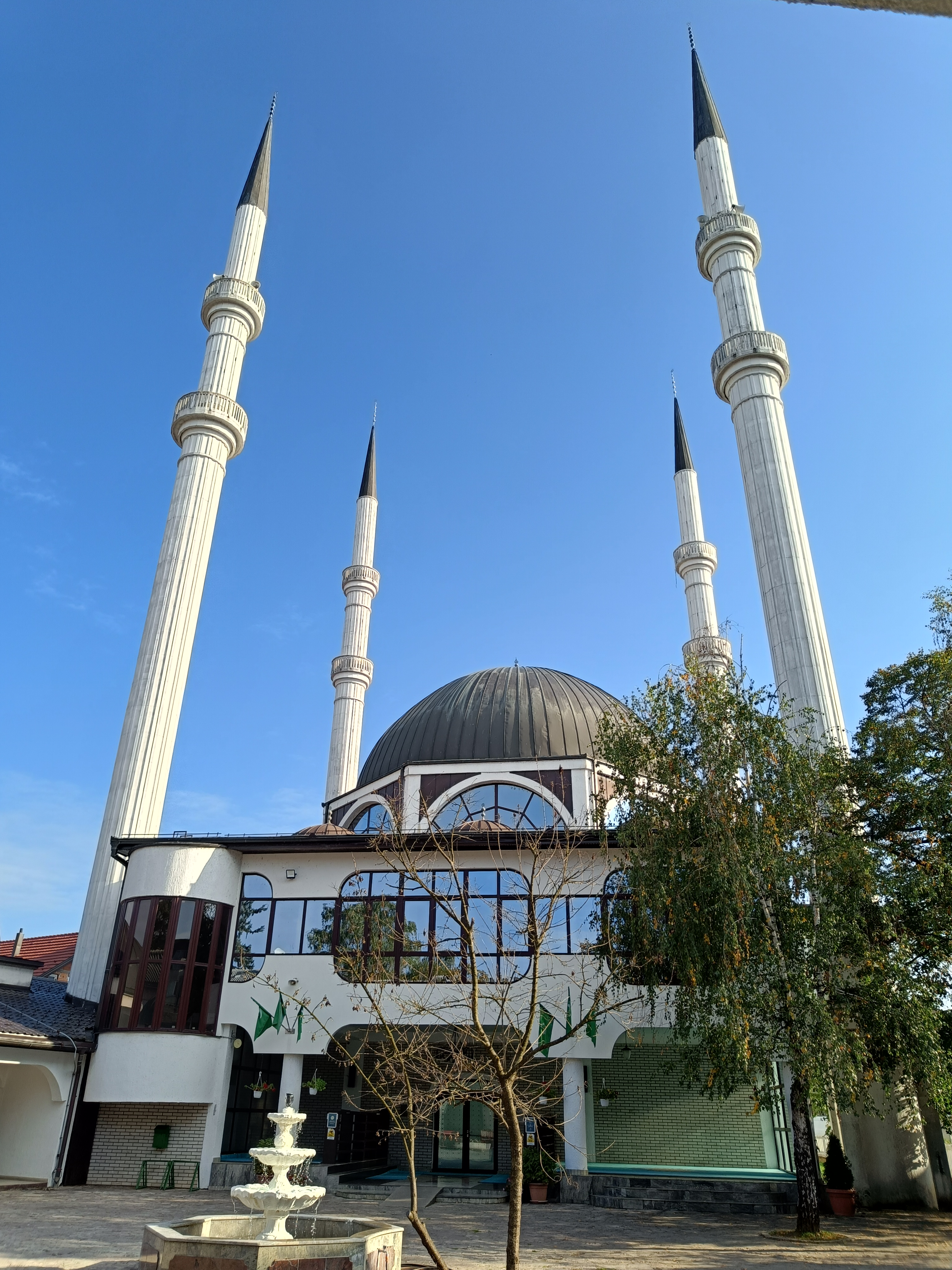
Hamzibey's mosque

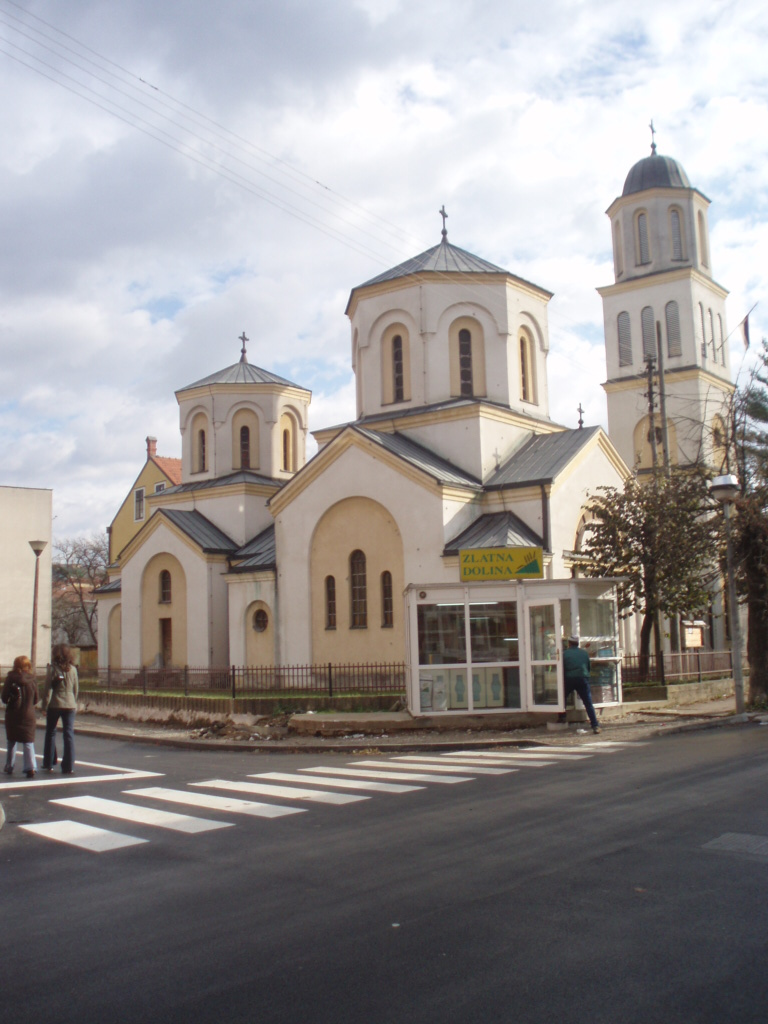
An Orthodox church

== See also ==
- Una-Sana Canton
- Bosanska Krajina
- Operation sana
